= College rugby in the United States =

Sport

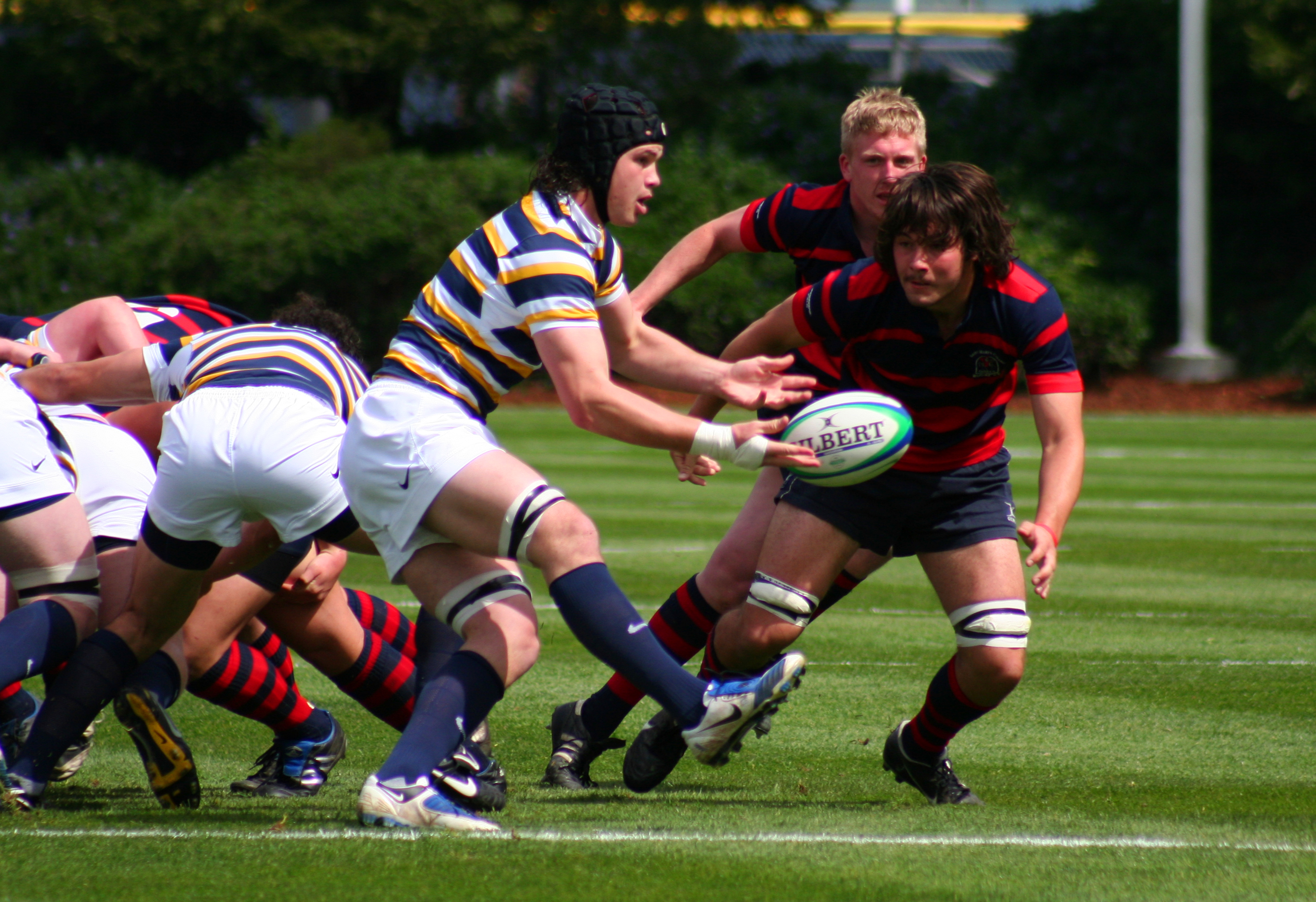
- California Golden Bears v Saint Mary's Gaels match in March 2010
- Governing body: USA Rugby; NCR (men's/women's); NIRA (women's)
- First played: 1874
- Registered players: 65,000
- Clubs: 900

Club competitions
- Division 1-A; Champions Cup; Ivy Championship; Collegiate Championship (7s)

College rugby is played by men and women throughout colleges and universities in the United States. Seven-a-side and fifteen-a-side variants of rugby union are most commonly played. Most collegiate rugby programs do not fall under the auspices of the NCAA and are instead governed by National Collegiate Rugby and USA Rugby, two nationwide governing bodies. 27 women's programs participate in the NCAA.

College rugby is the fastest growing college sport in the US and one of the fastest growing sports in the nation as the number of athletes increased by roughly 350% from 18,500 in 2006 to 65,000 in 2010. Women's rugby is an NCAA Emerging Sport. Over 900 college teams—male and female—are registered with USA Rugby and hundreds more with National Collegiate Rugby. Over 32,000 college players are registered with USA Rugby, making college rugby the largest section of its membership.

The highest profile college rugby sevens competition is the Collegiate Rugby Championship (CRC). College club rugby has included several championship competitions since 1980.

Rugby has been played in universities since as early as the 1800s, but in the 1960s rugby found a foothold in colleges, led by Catholic colleges such as Notre Dame and particularly Jesuit universities such as Boston College and St. Joseph's in Philadelphia. Several schools have upgraded their investments in rugby by creating programs with varsity or quasi-varsity status and funding for scholarships.

Alumni from collegiate programs make up much of the United States men's and women's national teams.

Major League Rugby implemented its first collegiate MLR Draft in 2020. Players are eligible for the draft after 3 years in college at 21 years old. Free agents can join teams at age 18.

== Governance ==
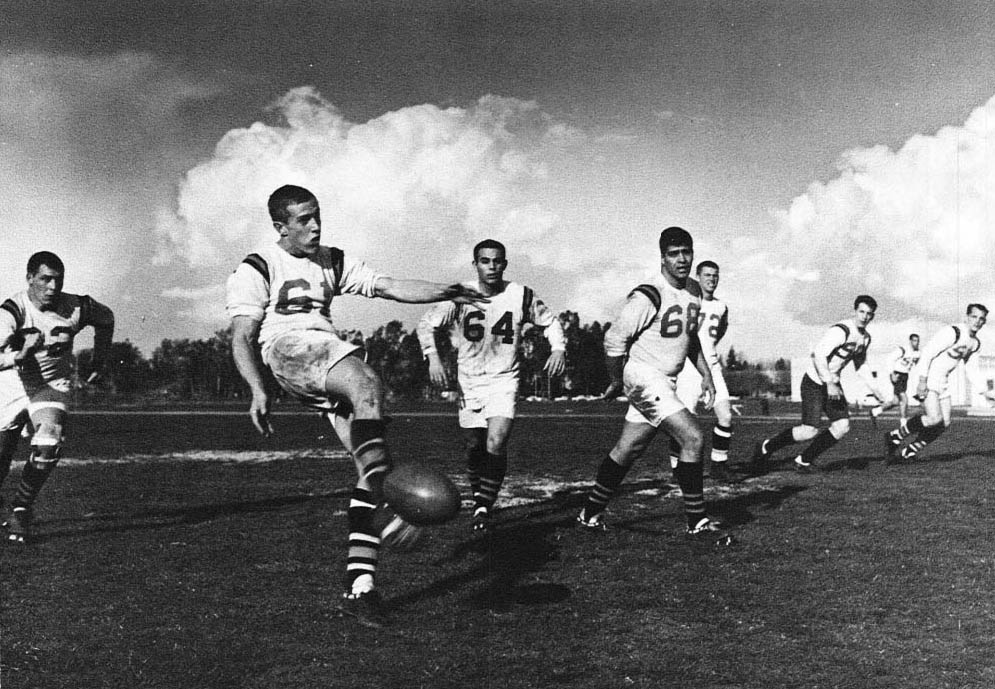
Pacific Tigers kicking off in a 1961 game

The College Rugby Association of America (CRAA) oversees the top-level men's and women's divisions.

27 schools govern their women's teams under applicable NCAA bylaws for recruiting and eligibility, under the NCAA's Emerging Sports for Women program. The NCAA has no authority over men's college rugby.

College rugby is often called a club sport because teams are usually administered by a student club sports department rather than the intercollegiate athletics department. Some schools promoted rugby to varsity status, committing resources for scholarships and paid coaches, or given rugby an elevated status short of full varsity status.

== History ==
In the United States, college rugby was traditionally governed by (in descending order of authority): USA Rugby, geographical unions (GUs) and local area unions (LAUs) (e.g., NERFU) and administered by a College Management Committee.

The Ivy Rugby Conference formed in 2009. This move signaled a shift away from the LAUs and GUs as the governing bodies for regional college rugby. By 2011 USA Rugby was urging college rugby programs to adopt new conference structures like the conferences used by their other athletic programs. In 2019, in the wake of USA Rugby's bankruptcy declaration, the College Rugby Association of America (CRAA) formed to oversee the top-level men's and women's divisions.

== Play and participation ==
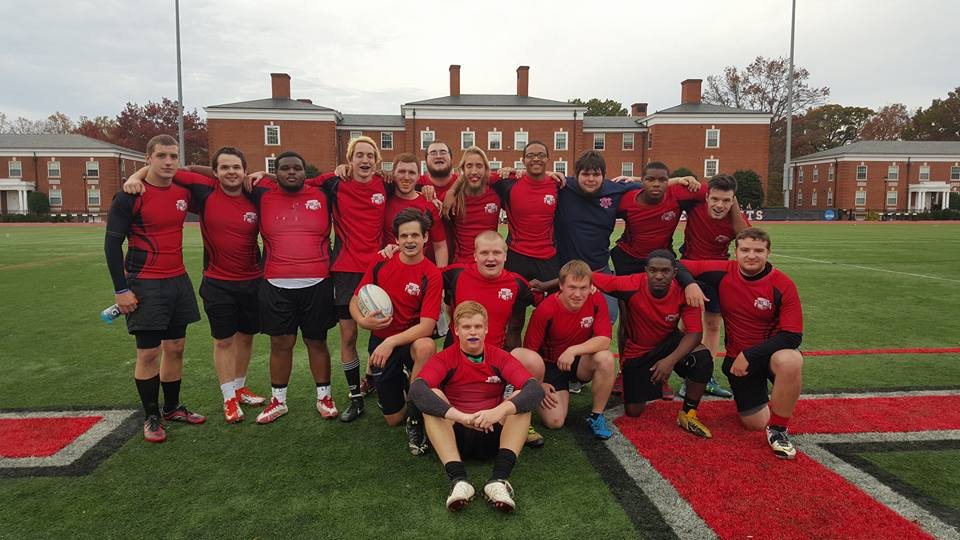
Lynchburg College team photo after defeating Emory & Henry College, 35–15. Fall 2015

Winter and spring are the primary seasons for conferences in the Pacific, Northwest, and South regions (e.g., PAC, Southeastern); the fall is the primary season for conferences in the Northeast, Mid-Atlantic and Upper Midwest (e.g., Big Ten, Atlantic Coast). Conferences establish playing schedules in the primary season, while in the secondary season the teams often set up friendly matches or focus on playing rugby sevens.

USA Rugby maintains player eligibility guidelines, administered by the local area unions. College players generally have five years of rugby eligibility from the time they graduate high school. On-field disciplinary issues are generally handled by the local area unions, while off-field disciplinary issues are governed by the academic institution and the local area union. USA Rugby's CIPP insurance program provides liability insurance to players, teams, administrators, and pitch hosts in exchange for an annual dues payment. Roughly one quarter of college rugby programs offer financial aid to their players.

Outstanding college rugby players are recognized as All-Americans. Qualified All-Americans can represent the United States in international tournaments by playing on the United States national under-20 rugby union team or the All Americans rugby union team.

== Divisions ==
College rugby competition within USA Rugby's collegiate arm is divided into several tiers:

- The highest is Division IA for men and women
- Division IAA for men and Division I for women
- Division II for men and women

A separate organization, National Collegiate Rugby (NCR), has competition for both men and women in its own defined D1, D2 and small college divisions. National Intercollegiate Rugby Association (NIRA) consists of women's NCAA DI, II and III rugby programs that adhere to NCAA organizational rules under a sanctioning agreement with USA Rugby.

USA Rugby generally allows colleges to select the division in which the college thinks it would fit best. Most schools remain in the same division from year-to-year, but there are exceptions. Schools that have been successful in a particular division may move up but are not required to do so; likewise, poorly performing schools may move down a division, but are not required to. Successful schools may have varied reasons for declining promotion. For example, a school may prefer to remain in its current conference against traditional rivals, or a school with a small budget might resist the additional travel expense that might come from switching divisions and conferences.

Significant movement across men's divisions occurred in 2011 when USA Rugby separated Division I into Division I-A and I-AA. This new arrangement caused Division I schools to choose one or the other, with 31 schools joining Division I-A and the majority of Division I schools joining Division I-AA. Additionally, the creation of Division I-AA caused several successful Division II schools to move up to Division I-A. The evolving division structures caused significant shifts in schools between Divisions I-A and I-AA in the following years, with half of the original 31 D I-A members leaving by the end of 2013, and new schools from lower divisions taking their place.

The governance of collegiate rugby was split and diverged in 2021. The umbrella of the USA Rugby Collegiate Council includes College Rugby Association of America (CRAA), American Collegiate Rugby Association (ACRA), American College Rugby (ACR), and independent conferences. National Collegiate Rugby (NCR), formerly NSCRO, challenged the existing structure and expanded beyond small colleges to include the higher divisions. Men's and women's conferences each chose as individual conferences (in some cases, schools within conferences also chose) to align with USA Rugby or NCR.

=== Women ===
Twelve women's conferences that played historically in DII left the oversight of USA Rugby to join NCR. Beginning in 2021, women's college rugby within NCR is split between Small College and an Open Division. The Open Division, which NCR now refers to as its DI, is made up of teams from these 12 conferences.

According to Goff Rugby Report, the DI Elite women's teams are part of College Rugby Association of America, and so are most women's DI conferences (eight conferences) and the independents. There are also a couple of DII or hybrid conferences within CRAA.

The American Collegiate Rugby Association is a group of four DII-level women's conferences remaining under the aegis of USA Rugby, which included 62 teams as of June 2020.

The collegiate women's programs in the NIRA operate their own regular season competition and championship.

=== Men ===
In 2011 USA Rugby created a new Division 1-A with approximately 30 schools forming a new premier division. Two men's conferences that played DI-A in 2019 joined NCR in 2021, as did three DI-AA conferences. Under NCR, they competed in fall 2021 as DI and DI-AA, with separate postseasons. In 2021, there were five men's DI-A conferences plus independents under USA Rugby/CRAA.

Men's DI-AA was dramatically split in 2021, with both NCR and CRAA-run postseasons in the fall. There was also a CRAA-run postseason in spring 2022. According to Goff Rugby Report, there was no way to have a sole men's DI-AA national champion in 2021–2022.

In 2021, most DII men's rugby conferences aligned with NCR.

== Varsity programs ==
=== Men's varsity ===
Majority of colleges classify their rugby programs as club sports rather than varsity sports. A growing number of universities, however, have begun labeling rugby as a varsity sport, realizing that a successful rugby program can have a net positive effect on university revenue and increase a school's marketability.

Men's College Varsity Programs (arranged by date)
No.	College	Athletic affiliation	Metro area	Varsity since	National achievements
1	California (Berkeley)	D1: Pac-12	Berkeley, CA	1882	26 national championships since 1980, 5 CRC 7s championships
2	Paul Smith's College	(USCAA)	Paul Smiths, NY	2000	2013 and 2017 ~ NSCRO Ranked Top 40
3	Cal Maritime	(NAIA)	Vallejo, CA	2001	NSCRO rank #1 (2009, 2010); runner-up (2012)
4	Franciscan University	D3: 3RRC	Steubenville, OH	2001	NSCRO Ranked #1 (2012); 3rd at Nationals
5	Norwich	D3: GNAC	Northfield, VT	2008	D2 national playoffs (2013)
6	American International College	D2: NE-10	Springfield, MA	2009	
7	Davenport University	D2: Great Lakes	Grand Rapids, MI	2009	
8	Life University	(NAIA)	Marietta, GA	2010	D1-A champion (2013, 2016, 2018, 2019); D1-A runner-up (2014, 2015, 2017)
9	Lindenwood	D1: Ohio	Saint Louis, MO	2011	D1 7s champion (2015, 2017, 2018), CRC 7s champion (2018); D1-AA runner-up (2013)
10	Wheeling University	D2: Mtn. East	Wheeling, WV	2012	
11	Principia College	D3	Elsah, IL	Pre-2013	USA Rugby Division 2 7s title champion (2013). NCR D2 National Champs 15s (2022)
12	Army	D1: Patriot	West Point, NY	2014	
13	Bethel College	(NAIA)	Mishawaka, IN	2015	
14	New England College	D3: NECC	Henniker, NH	2015	NSCRO National Champions VII's (2014), NSCRO National Champion XV's (2015), National runner-up XV's (2014)
15	Marywood University	D3	Scranton, PA	2018	
16	Queens University of Charlotte	D2: SAC	Charlotte, NC	2018	
17	Southern Virginia University		Buena Vista, Virginia	2019	
18	Belmont Abbey College		Belmont, North Carolina	2019	
19	Adrian College		Adrian, Michigan	2021	
20	McKendree University		Lebanon, Illinois	2021	
21	Siena College		Loudonville, New York	2021	
22	Navy	D1: Patriot	Annapolis, MD	2022	
23	Walsh University		North Canton, Ohio	2024	
24	Alfred University		Alfred, NY	2026	
25	Loyola University		New Orleans, La	2026	

Former Men's College Varsity Programs (arranged by date)
No.	College	Athletic affiliation	Metro area	Varsity duration	National achievements/notes
1	UCLA	D1A: Independent	Los Angeles	1934-1982	2 national championships: 1972, 1975
2	Alderson Broaddus University	DII	Philippi, West Virginia	2019-2023	
3	Notre Dame College	DII	South Euclid, Ohio	2012-2024	Walsh University took on Notre Dame College's varsity rugby teams after its closure in 2024.
4	Central Washington	DII	Ellensburg, Washington	2014-2025	Central Washington University announced it would close its varsity programs at the end of the academic year in 2025 having been varsity since 2014.

Men's College Quasi-Varsity Programs
No.	College	Athletic affiliation	Metro area	Status
1	Penn State	D1: Big Ten	University Park, PA	"Team sports" status; member of Athletic Department.
2	BYU	D1: West Coast	Provo, UT	Rugby is one of four extramural sports teams sponsored by the school.
3	Spring Hill College	D2: SIAC	Mobile, AL	Receives support from the athletics department, including a full-time head coach.
4	Kutztown	D2: PSAC	Kutztown, PA	Kutztown rugby has been designated as elite club status.
5	Arizona	D1: Pac-12	Tucson, AZ	Rugby is in the "Cactus Tier", an elevated level of intercollegiate competition.
6	Mount St. Mary's	D1: Northeast	Emmitsburg, MD	Elevated to "Premier Team Sport" status.
7	Dartmouth	D1: Ivy League	Hanover, NH	Men's rugby uses varsity facilities, has full-time coaching staff.
8	Texas	D1:SEC	Austin, Tx	Men's rugby upgraded to 'Olympic sport' designation.
9	Catholic University of America	D3:MAC	Washington, DC	Men's rugby elevated to 'Premier Team Sport'.
10	Eastern University		Philadelphia, Pennsylvania	

=== Women's Rugby: An NCAA Emerging Sport ===
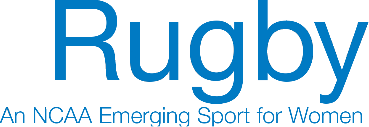
Logo of NCAA Rugby with the "Emerging Sport" at bottom

The NCAA marked women's rugby as an NCAA Emerging Sports for Women in 2002. Thereafter schools began adding women's rugby as an NCAA sport. An "Emerging Sport" must gain championship status (minimum 40 varsity programs, except 28 for Division III) within 10 years, or show progress toward that goal to remain on the list. Until then, it is under the auspices of the NCAA and its respective institutions. Emerging Sport status allows competition to include club teams to satisfy the NCAA's minimum number of competitions rule.

Growth was initially slow, with only 5 of nearly 350 collegiate teams qualifying. The push for NCAA rugby status received a boost in 2009 when the International Olympic Committee announced that rugby would return to the Summer Olympics in 2016. Although NCAA Division I schools dropped 72 women's varsity sports teams during 2008–2012 due to the recession, women's rugby programs grew in number.

As of the fall of 2022, the NCAA had sanctioned rugby for 27 schools across three divisions, adding Princeton University for the 2022–23 season. In addition, other schools have teams with varsity status that are not under NCAA governance. Current women's varsity rugby programs, as of March 2025, include the following:

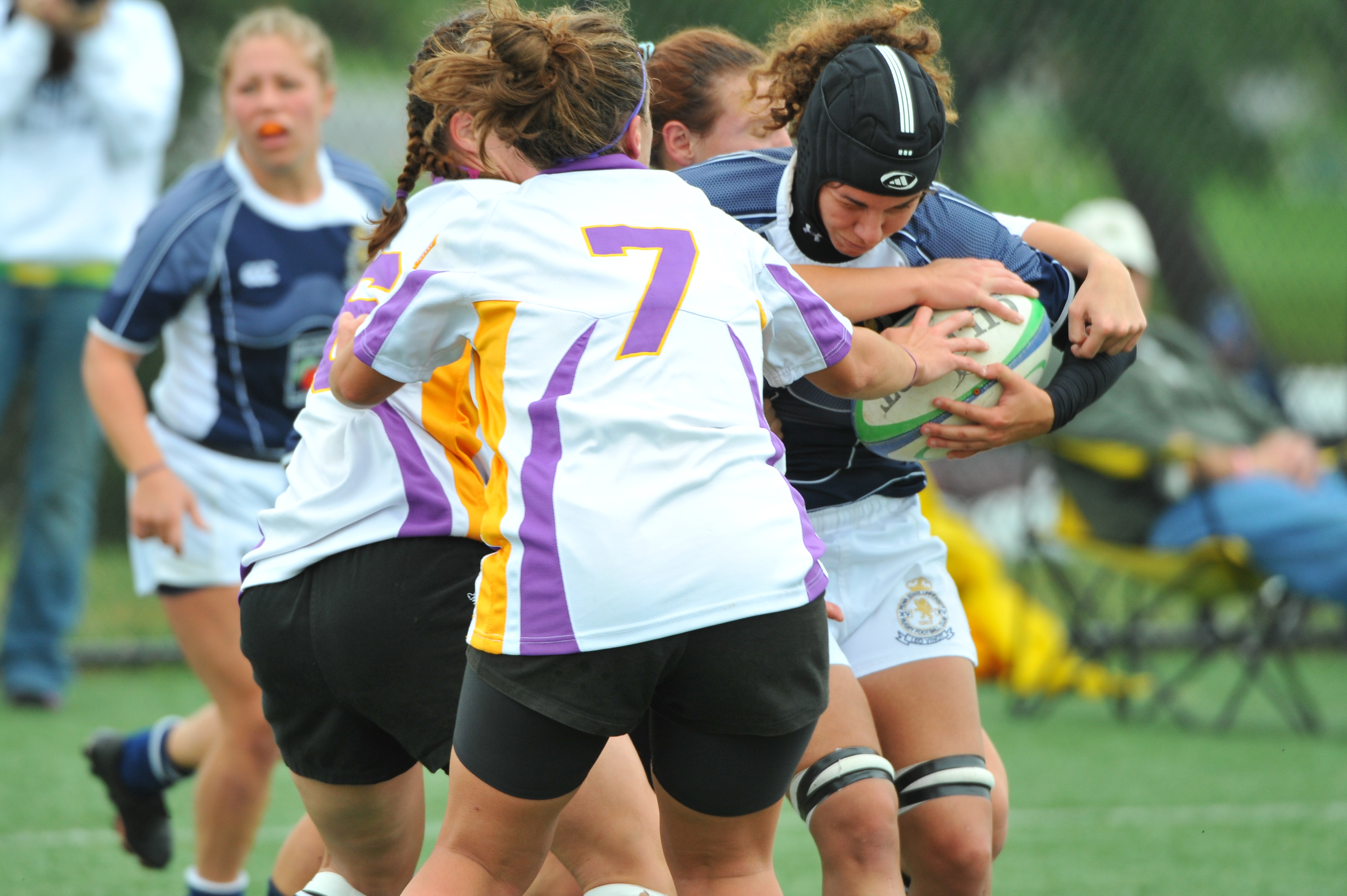
Penn State vs West Chester University of Pennsylvania (2008).Nichole Lopes '07 '09 with the ball for Penn State

Women's varsity programs
	School	Metro area	Varsity since	NIRA Division
1	Bowdoin College	Brunswick, Maine	2004	III
2	West Chester University	West Chester, Pennsylvania	2004	II
3	Norwich University	Northfield, Vermont	2005	
4	Army	West Point, New York	2010	I
5	Life University	Marietta, Georgia	2010	
6	Harvard University	Cambridge, Massachusetts	2013	I
7	Brown University	Providence, Rhodes Island	2014	I
8	American International College	Springfield, Massachusetts	2015	II
9	Dartmouth College	Hanover, New Hampshire	2015	I
10	Sacred Heart University	Fairfield, Connecticut	2015	I
11	Vermont State University	Castleton, Vermont	2016	
12	University of New England	Portland, Maine	2016	III
13	Wheeling University	Wheeling, West Virginia	2016	
14	Paul Smith's College	Paul Smiths, New York	2016	
15	Long Island University	Brooklyn, New York	2017	I
16	Mount St. Mary's University	Emmitsburg, Maryland	2017	I
17	Queens University of Charlotte	Charlotte, North Carolina	2018	I
18	Guilford College	Greensboro, North Carolina	2019	III
19	New England College	Henniker, New Hampshire	2019	
20	Post University	Waterbury, Connecticut	2020	
21	Adrian College	Adrian, Michigan	2021	
22	McKendree University	Lebanon, Illinois	2021	
23	University of New Haven	West Haven, Connecticut	2021	II
24	Lander University	Greenwood, South Carolina	2021	
25	Princeton University	Princeton, New Jersey	2022	I
26	Navy	Annapolis, Maryland	2022	I
27	Davenport University	Grand Rapids, Michigan	2022	II
28	Newberry College	Newberry, South Carolina	2022	II
29	Siena College	Loudonville, New York	2022	
30	Warren Wilson College	Swannanoa, North Carolina	2023	III
31	Frostburg State University	Frostburg, Maryland	2023	II
32	Emory & Henry University	Emory, Virginia	2023	II
33	Lindenwood	St. Charles, Missouri	2024	I
34	Walsh University	North Canton, Ohio	2024	
35	La Salle University	Philadelphia, Pennsylvania	2025	I
36	Thomas College	Waterville, Maine	2025	III
37	Alfred University	Alfred, New York	2025	
38	Loyola University	New Orleans, Louisiana	2026	

Castleton University merged with several other universities to form Vermont State University in 2023.

Women's College Quasi-Varsity Programs
No.	School	Metro area	Athletic affiliation	Notes
1	Eastern University	Philadelphia, Pennsylvania		

Former Women's varsity programs
	School	Metro area	Varsity duration	NIRA Division	Notes}
1	Quinnipiac University	Hamden, Connecticut	2011-2026	I	
2	Notre Dame College	South Euclid, Ohio	2012-2024		Walsh University took on Notre Dame College's varsity rugby teams after its closure in 2024.
3	Central Washington	Ellensburg, Washington	2014-2025		Central Washington University announced it would close its varsity programs at the end of the academic year in 2025.
4	Alderson Broaddus University	Philippi, West Virginia	2019-2023		

== Division 1 Men's National Championships (15s) ==
=== National Invitational Championship ===
Year	Champion	Match score	Runner-up	Ref.
1972	Palmer College of Chiropractic	28–17	Navy	
1973	Palmer College of Chiropractic	13–4	Illinois	
1974	Texas A&M	12–0	LSU	
1975	not held			
1976	LSU	21–3	Palmer College of Chiropractic	
1977	moved from fall to following spring			
1978	Palmer College of Chiropractic	19–4	LSU	
1979	Palmer College of Chiropractic	24–6	LSU	

=== USA Rugby 1980–2012 ===
Except for interruption by the COVID-19 pandemic, USA Rugby has crowned an official national men's champion each year since 1980. After the 2010 season, USA Rugby split Division 1 into two, with the top flight called Division 1-A Rugby (formerly called the College Premier Division), and the second flight called Division 1-AA.

Year	Champion	Match score	Runner-up
1980	California	15 – 9	Air Force
1981	California	6 – 3 (a.e.t.)	Harvard
1982	California	15 – 14	Life College
1983	California	13 – 3	Air Force
1984	Harvard	12 – 4	Colorado
1985	California	31 – 6	Maryland
1986	California	6 – 4	Dartmouth
1987	San Diego State	10 – 9	Air Force
1988	California	9 – 3	Dartmouth
1989	Air Force	25 – 7	Penn State
1990	Air Force	18 – 12	Army
1991	California	20 – 14	Army
1992	California	27 – 17	Army
1993	California	36 – 6	Air Force
1994	California	27 – 13	Navy
1995	California	48 – 16	Air Force
1996	California	47 – 6	Penn State
1997	California	41 – 15	Penn State
1998	California	34 – 15	Stanford
1999	California	36 – 5	Penn State
2000	California	62 – 16	Wyoming
2001	California	86 – 11	Penn State
2002	California	43 – 22	Utah
2003	Air Force	45 – 37	Harvard
2004	California	46 – 24	Cal Poly
2005	California	44 – 7	Utah
2006	California	29 – 26	BYU
2007	California	37 – 7	BYU
2008	California	59 – 7	BYU
2009	BYU	25 – 22	California
2010	California	19 – 7	BYU
2011	California	21 – 14	BYU
2012	BYU	49 – 42	Arkansas State

=== 2013–2017 ===
In 2013, eight of the top college rugby teams withdrew from the USA Rugby D1A competition and organized their own championship called the Varsity Cup. The media and other rugby commentators viewed the Varsity Cup as equivalent to the USA Rugby D1A championship, given the strength of the teams participating and the fact that the 2013 Varsity Cup finalists—BYU and Cal—finished the spring 2013 season as the consensus #1 and #2 ranked teams in all of college rugby. Four additional schools joined the Varsity Cup for 2014, bringing the number of teams in that tournament to twelve. The Varsity Cup was successful in gaining media exposure, with the 2014 Varsity Cup final televised live on NBCSN. USA Rugby responded to the successful promotion of its Varsity Cup rivals by signing a ten-year contract in October 2014 with IMG that would focus on the marketing and increase exposure of USA Rugby's Collegiate National Championship. The Varsity Cup folded in November 2017 when the organizer, broadcast partner and a major sponsor, Penn Mutual, withdrew their support.

The lists below show the champions for the Division 1-A Rugby and the Varsity Cup championships for each year, along with the teams' final regular season rankings, as ranked by RugbyMag/RugbyToday.com.

USA Rugby championship
Year	Champion	Match score	Runner-up
2013	(#3) Life University	16 – 14	St. Mary's (CA) (#5)
2014	(#1) St. Mary's (CA)	21 – 6	Life University (#3)
2015	(#3) St. Mary's (CA)	30 – 24	Life University (#4)
2016	(#3) Life University	24 – 20	St. Mary's (CA) (#5)
2017	(#1) St. Mary's (CA)	30 – 24	Life University (#2)

Varsity Cup Championship
Year	Champion	Match score	Runner-up
2013	(#1) BYU	27 – 24	California (#2)
2014	(#2) BYU	43 – 33	California (#4)
2015	(#1) BYU (Note: In 2016, BYU was stripped of the 2015 title for using an ineligible player.)	30- 27	California (#2)
2016	(#1) Cal	40 – 29	BYU (#2)
2017	(#3) Cal	43 – 13	Arkansas St. (#5)

=== USA Rugby 2018–present ===
2018–present
Year	Champion	Match score	Runner-up
2018	Life University	60 – 5	California
2019	Life University	29 – 26	California
2020	cancelled (pandemic)		
2021	cancelled (pandemic)		
2022	Army	20 – 8	St. Mary's (CA)
2023	Navy	28 – 22	California
2024	St. Mary's	26 – 22	Navy
2025	California	55 – 38	Life University
2026	California	36 – 22	Navy

=== National Collegiate Rugby (Men) ===
Division I
Year	Champion	Match score	Runner-up
2021	St. Bonaventure	19 – 18	Penn State
2022	Brown	21 – 5	Queens
2023	Notre Dame College	33 – 10	St. Bonaventure
2024	Brown	23 – 20	Queens
2025	St. Bonaventure	55-19	Queens

=== Men's Division 1-AA ===
==== USA Rugby ====
2011–present
Year	Champion	Match score	Runner-up
2011	Davenport	38 – 19	UC Santa Barbara
2012	Davenport	39 – 0	San Diego State (Davenport promoted to D-1A for the following season)
2013	Central Florida	27 – 25	Lindenwood (Lindenwood promoted to D-1A for the following season)
2014	Central Florida	64 – 13	Arizona
2015	UC Davis	18 – 15	Central Florida
2016	UC Davis	17 – 13	Notre Dame College
2017	Notre Dame College	40 – 20	UC Davis
2018	Mary Washington	38 – 30	Dartmouth
2018 fall	Bowling Green	19 – 7	Saint Joseph's
2019 spring	Dartmouth	46 – 5	Chico State
2019 fall	Iowa Central Community College	36 – 21	Western Michigan
2020 spring	Cancelled (pandemic)		
2020 fall	Cancelled (pandemic)		
2021 spring	Cancelled (pandemic)		
2021 fall	Tennessee	36 – 31	Bowling Green (CRAA)
2022 spring	Fresno State	22 – 17	Kansas (ACR)
2023 spring	Sacramento State	28 – 24	Florida State (CRAA)
2023 spring	University of San Diego	41 – 19	Iowa State (ACR)
2024 spring	University of San Diego	38 – 7	Iowa State (CRAA)
2025 spring	St. Thomas University (Florida)	38 – 32	University of San Diego

==== National Collegiate Rugby (Men) ====
Division I-AA
Year	Champion	Match score	Runner-up
2021	Virginia Tech	34 – 22	West Chester
2022	Virginia Tech	24 – 22	Louisville
2023	Kentucky	43 – 28	Louisville
2024	Kentucky	57 – 14	Bowling Green
2025	Tennessee	21 – 15	Bowling Green

== Division 1 Women's National Championships (15s) ==
=== USA Rugby Women's Division 1A ===
The following are the results from the Division 1 women's national championship, from 1991 to the present. USA Rugby established a new division called "Division 1 Elite" that began championship competition in 2016, following which the remainder of Division 1 was called "Division 1 Club" (later shortened to "Division 1"). Division 1 Elite became "Division 1A" in the 2024-2025 season.

Division 1
Year	Champion	Match score	Runner-up
1991	Air Force	12–0	Boston College
1992	Boston College	12–6	Connecticut
1993	Connecticut	17–0	Air Force
1994	Air Force	7–3	Boston College
1995	Princeton	20–0	Penn State
1996	Princeton		Penn State
1997	Penn State		Radcliffe
1998	Radcliffe		Penn State
1999	Stanford		Princeton
2000	Penn State		Princeton
2001	Chico State		Penn State
2002	Air Force		Penn State
2003	Air Force		Illinois
2004	Penn State		Princeton
2005	Stanford	53 – 6	Penn State
2006	Stanford	15 – 12	Penn State
2007	Penn State	22 – 21	Stanford
2008	Stanford	15 – 10	Penn State
2009	Penn State	46 – 7	Stanford
2010	Penn State	24 – 7	Stanford
2011	Army	33 – 29	Penn State
2012	Penn State	32 – 12	Stanford
2013	Penn State	65 – 10	Norwich
2014	Penn State	38 – 0	Stanford
2015	Penn State	61 – 7	Central Washington

Division 1A ("Division 1 Elite" through 2024)
Year	Champion	Match score	Runner-up
2016	Penn State	15 – 5	Brigham Young
2017	Penn State	28 – 25	Lindenwood
2018	Lindenwood	36 – 9	Life University
2019	Lindenwood	36 – 19	Life University
2020	cancelled (pandemic)		
2021	Lindenwood	54 – 12	Life University
2022	Lindenwood	21 – 0	Life University
2022 (fall)	Lindenwood	17 – 15	Life University (CRAA, moved from spring 2023 to fall 2022)
2024	Life University	44 – 41	Lindenwood (CRAA, moved from fall 2023 to spring 2024)
2025	Lindenwood	19 – 15	Life University (CRAA)

=== USA Rugby Women's Division 1 ===
Division 1 (formerly "Division 1 Club")
Year	Champion	Match score	Runner-up
2015–16 (fall)	Connecticut	19 – 12	Air Force
(spring)	UC Davis	30 – 25	Virginia
2016–17 (fall)	Air Force	19 – 8	Connecticut
(spring)	UC Davis	27 – 19	Notre Dame College
2017–18 (fall)	Davenport	89 – 24	Notre Dame College
(spring)	Chico State	54 – 26	UCF
2018–19 (fall)	Air Force	40 – 27	Davenport
(spring)	BYU	48 – 0	Virginia Tech
2019–20 (fall)	Air Force	26 – 10	Navy
(spring)	cancelled (pandemic)		
2020–21 (fall)	cancelled (pandemic)		
(spring)	cancelled (pandemic)		
2021–22 (fall)	Navy	20 – 12	Davenport (CRAA)
(spring)	BYU	80 – 7	Virginia Tech (CRAA)
2022–23 (fall)	Navy	61 – 28	Utah State (CRAA)
(spring)	BYU	forfeit	Virginia (CRAA)
2023–24 (fall)	Northeastern	42 – 7	Colorado Mesa (CRAA)
(spring)	Stanford	36 – 19	Grand Canyon (CRAA)
2024–25	Stanford	57 – 25	California (CRAA)

=== National Collegiate Rugby (Women) ===
Division 1
Year	Champion	Match score	Runner-up
2021 (fall)	Life University	87 – 3	Northern Iowa (For NCR in 2021, Life University fielded a largely freshman and sophomore team.)
2022 (fall)	Michigan	41 – 14	Notre Dame College
2023 (fall)	Michigan	33 – 17	Notre Dame College
2024 (fall)	Wheeling	58 – 17	Southern Nazarene

== College Rugby Sevens ==
Since the 2009 announcement that rugby sevens will be included in the 2016 Olympics, college rugby sevens has grown more popular. The addition of Rugby 7s to the 2016 Summer Olympics has led to increasing interest from TV and other media coverage, and an increased emphasis in the collegiate ranks on the 7s game. For example, the University of Texas founded its competitive rugby sevens program in 2010. Cal rugby announced in December 2011 that beginning in 2013 it would use the fall term for sevens.

=== Collegiate Rugby Championship ===
The Collegiate Rugby Championship (CRC) is the highest profile college sevens rugby championship in the United States. The inaugural CRC, held in Columbus, Ohio in June 2010 was televised live by NBC and NBC Universal. The result was high ratings, with the CRC ratings beating the NCAA lacrosse championship.

The success of the inaugural 2010 tournament led to a second tournament in 2011 at PPL Park in Philadelphia, again televised live by NBC. NBC recognized that rugby is growing in popularity, participation, and interest. In 2014, the Penn Mutual Life Insurance company become the title sponsor of the championship. The tournament grew each year and was signed to a multi-year deal with several large sponsors and Talen Energy Stadium (Formerly PPL Park) for the tournament to be held in Philadelphia for several more years.

The National Collegiate Rugby Organization obtained the rights to the CRC in 2020 and in 2021 and 2022 staged its championship 7s matches at the tournament in New Orleans. In 2023, it moved to the Maryland suburbs of Washington DC.

==== Men's ====
Division I Premier ("Division I" before 2022)
Year	Champion	Match score	Runner-up
2010	Utah	31 – 26	California
2011	Dartmouth	32 – 10	Army
2012	Dartmouth	24 – 5	Arizona
2013	California	19 – 14	Life
2014	California	24 – 21	Kutztown
2015	California	17 – 12 (a.e.t.)	Kutztown
2016	California	31 – 7	UCLA
2017	California	19 – 0	Life
2018	Lindenwood	24 – 7	UCLA
2019	Lindenwood	21 – 12	Life
2020	cancelled (pandemic)		
2021	Lindenwood	24 – 14	Life
2022	Kutztown	17 – 12	Dartmouth
2023	Mount St. Mary's	19 – 5	Indiana
2024	Wheeling	29 – 12	Kutztown
2025	Wheeling	19 – 5	St. Bonaventure

Division I Club
Year	Champion	Match score	Runner-up
2022	Sam Houston State	17 – 15	Salisbury
2023	University of San Diego	15 – 7	Clemson
2024	Louisville	29 – 0	North Carolina State
2025	North Carolina State	12 – 7	UNC Charlotte

==== Women's ====
Division I Premier ("Division I" before 2022)
Year	Champion	Match score	Runner-up
2011	Army	14 – 5	Penn State
2012	not held		
2013	Penn State	31 – 5	Ohio State
2014	Penn State	29 – 12	James Madison
2015	Penn State	24 – 7	Lindenwood
2016	Life	19 – 10	Lindenwood
2017	Life	17 – 12	Lindenwood
2018	Lindenwood	21 – 12	Penn State
2019	Lindenwood	34 – 12	Army
2020	cancelled (pandemic)		
2021	Lindenwood	10 – 7	Life
2022	Lindenwood	19 – 7	Life (Premier)
2023	Brown	21 – 19	Army
2024	Brown	12 – 5	Army
2025	Brown	19 – 7	Army

Division I Club
Year	Champion	Match score	Runner-up
2022	Roger Williams	12 – 7	Wisconsin–Eau Claire
2023	Clemson	29 – 17	Massachusetts
2024	Claremont	17 – 7	Oregon
2025	Northeastern	15 – 12	Iowa

=== USA Rugby National Championship ===
USA Rugby announced in September 2011 the creation of a new sevens tournament, the USA Rugby Sevens Collegiate National Championships. The tournament was held annually at the end of the fall season for its first three years and featured 24 teams. Qualification is based on performance at sevens tournaments during the fall, where tournament winners receive automatic bids, with the remaining places in the 24-team field filled by invitation. Some of the more high-profile qualifying tournaments include tournaments based on traditional conference rivalries, such as the Atlantic Coast 7s (composed mostly of ACC schools), the Southeastern 7s (composed mostly of SEC schools) and the Heart of America 7s (composed mostly of Big 12 schools).

The inaugural Championship tournament was held December 16–17, 2011 in College Station, Texas, and was contested by 24 teams that qualified based on performance in qualifying tournaments throughout the fall of 2011. The 2011 tournament was won by Life University, defeating Central Washington 22–17 in overtime. Tim Stanfill of Central Washington was the tournament MVP, Derek Patrick of Miami was the tournament's leading try scorer, and Colton Caraiga of Life University was the tournament's leading points scorer. In the first three years, strong teams that won bids have declined to participate.

==== Men's Division I ====
Division I
Year	Champion	Match score	Runner-up
2011	Life University	22 – 17	Central Washington
2012	Arkansas State	21 -7	Life University
2013	Arkansas State	32 – 12	Saint Mary's (CA)
2014	(moved from fall 2014 to spring 2015)		
2015	Lindenwood	28 – 10	Davenport
2016	Saint Mary's	7 – 5	AIC
2017	Lindenwood	26 – 5	Saint Mary's
2018	Lindenwood	26 – 12	California
2019	Lindenwood	36 – 0	AIC
2020	cancelled (pandemic)		
2021	cancelled (pandemic)		
2022	Life University	24 – 19 (a.e.t.)	Lindenwood
2023	Life University	28 – 17	Lindenwood
2024	cancelled (not enough teams)		
2025	not held		

==== Men's Division I-AA ====
Division I-AA
Year	Champion	Match score	Runner-up
2019	Lindenwood-Belleville	19 – 5	Western Michigan
2020	cancelled (pandemic)		
2021	cancelled (pandemic)		
2022	San Diego	28 – 14	Harvard
2023	Iowa State	20 – 10	Nebraska (ACR)
2024	Western Washington	21 – 0	Oregon (CRAA/ACR)
2025	St. Thomas University (Florida)	42 – 12	Iowa (CRAA)

==== Women's ====
Division I Elite/Premier
Year	Champion	Match score	Runner-up
2018	Lindenwood	20–0	Penn State
2019	Lindenwood	24–7	Dartmouth
2020	cancelled (pandemic)		
2021	cancelled (pandemic)		
2022	Lindenwood	32 – 0	Dartmouth
2023	Life	17 – 12	Lindenwood
2024	Harvard	17 – 12	Lindenwood
2025	Dartmouth	31 – 0	Life University

Division I/College Club
Year	Champion	Match score	Runner-up
2011	Norwich University	34–5	Boston College
2012	Norwich University	17–5	Navy
2013	Norwich University	17–10	James Madison
2014	(moved from fall to spring)		
2015	Penn State	47–26	Central Washington
2016	Life	10–0	Lindenwood
2017 (Open, all divisions)	Lindenwood	31–12	Life
2018 (Open to DII)	Air Force	20–17	Chico State
2019	Air Force	21–5	Virginia Tech
2020	cancelled (pandemic)		
2021	cancelled (pandemic)		
2022	Davenport	24 – 17	Navy
2023	Northeastern	19 – 5	Air Force
2024 (Open to DII)	Western Washington	12 – 7	Colorado State
2025 (Open to DII)	Stanford	19 – 7	California

== Conference membership ==
Team rankings are in parentheses, based on Goff Rugby Report rankings, current as of January 2017.

=== Division I-A ===
The conference champion is invited to the D1A playoffs along with several at large bids for independents or other highly ranked teams.

California St. Mary's (3) Santa Clara Cal Poly SLO (20) San Diego State (23) UC Santa Barbara Grand Canyon	PAC California (1) UCLA (17) Arizona (21) Utah (18)	Rocky Mountain Colorado (38) Air Force (32) Colorado State (31) New Mexico Wyoming Utah State BYU	Mid-South Life (2) Lindenwood (9) Davenport (10) Arkansas State (12)	East Army (11) Navy Penn State (6)	Big Ten Universities Wisconsin (14) Illinois Ohio State (15) Michigan Michigan State	Red River Oklahoma (40) Texas A&M Baylor (45) Texas TCU Texas Tech North Texas

=== Division I-AA ===
Italics indicate second teams of clubs competing in D I-A. These teams are ineligible for Division I-AA playoffs.

Atlantic Coast North Carolina St. North Carolina Wake Forest	Mid Atlantic Maryland Virginia Virginia Tech Georgetown James Madison (26) Mary Washington Mount St. Mary's (39) Salisbury Towson	East Coast (defunct) AIC (16) Albany Boston College (27) Connecticut Massachusetts New England College Northeastern Fairfield	Empire Stony Brook (25) Binghamton Brockport Colgate Fordham Merchant Marine Syracuse	Gold Coast Claremont Long Beach (24) San Diego Santa Barbara CC Fullerton Azusa Pacific Grand Canyon	Heart of America Iowa State Kansas Kansas State Minnesota Missouri (44) Oklahoma State Nebraska Washington (MO) Truman State

Ivy
Dartmouth (34)
Cornell
Brown
Columbia
Harvard
Penn
Princeton
Yale

Keystone
Rutgers
St. Joseph's (48)
Millersville
Pittsburgh
Lock Haven
Temple
Villanova
West Chester

MAC Schools
North	South
Bowling Green (13)	Cincinnati
Kent State	Dayton
Central Michigan	Louisville
Northern Illinois	Miami (Ohio)
Western Michigan	Ohio

NCRC
Oregon
Boise State
Washington (43)
Eastern Washington
Western Oregon
Western Washington (42)
Washington State
Gonzaga
OSU

Pacific Western
Chico State
Sacramento State (50)
Fresno State
San Francisco State
San Jose State
Stanford
Nevada
UC Santa Cruz
Humboldt State

Mountain States
Idaho State
BYU B Team
Salt Lake CC
Snow College
Southern Utah
Weber State
UNLV
Utah Tech
Utah Valley

South Independent Rugby Conference
North	South
Middle Tennessee	Central Florida
Kennesaw State	Florida International
Memphis	Florida State
Georgia Tech	South Florida
Georgia Southern	Northern Florida

SCRC
West	East
Alabama (35)	South Carolina (41)
Auburn	Georgia
Florida	Kentucky (37)
Mississippi	Tennessee (36)
Mississippi State	Vanderbilt

Southwest
Rice
Saint Edward's
Stephen F. Austin
Texas State

Independent
Cent. Washington (5)
Notre Dame (30)
East Carolina
New England College
Notre Dame College (7)
Lindenwood-Belleville (25)

Former Conferences:

- The Mid-Eastern conference disbanded in summer 2012, as most members went to the D1-A Big Ten Universities or to the D1-AA Mid-America conference.
- The Midwest conference disbanded in summer 2012, as most members went to the D1-A Big Ten Universities or to Division 2.

== Organization and conferences ==
American college rugby is governed by USA Rugby. In the past, college rugby competitions have been governed by local unions.

The structure of the college game has evolved significantly in recent years. To increase the marketability of the game, many traditional rivals have been consolidated into conferences resembling major NCAA conferences such as the Pac-12 and Big Ten.

== Conferences and conference tournaments ==
Beginning around 2010, college rugby programs began realigning into conference structures that mirror the traditional NCAA conferences used by the member schools' other athletic programs. The first high-profile example was the formation of the Ivy League Rugby Conference in 2010. Following the organization of the Ivy League schools, the members of the Atlantic Coast Conference and the Southeastern Conference followed suit in 2010.

=== Ivy Rugby Conference ===
The Ivy Rugby Conference was formed and had its first full season in 2009. The IRC was formed to foster better competition among rugby teams from the Ivy League schools and to raise the quality of play. The IRC has had consistent success in attracting commercial interests. The IRC formed committees to manage the league, independently of the LAUs and TUs. Prior to formation of the IRC, clubs from the eight Ivy League schools had competed in the Ivy Rugby Championship Tournament since 1969.

=== Southeastern Collegiate Rugby Conference ===
In December 2010, a core group of founding schools formed the Southeastern Collegiate Rugby Conference (SCRC). By April 2010, the SCRC had expanded to 11 schools, comprising the entire membership of the NCAA's Southeastern Conference (SEC) at that time except for Arkansas. Tennessee won the 2010 Southeastern Collegiate Rugby Sevens Championship beating LSU 19–17, and repeated in the 2011 SCRC Olympic Sevens Championship, beating Florida 26–14 in the final. Similar to other conferences, the SCRC has also enjoyed commercial success, announcing in fall 2010 that the SCRC had formed commercial partnership agreements with Adidas and the World Rugby Shop.

The Southeastern Collegiate Rugby Conference, formed by the aforementioned 11 SEC schools, was created in late 2010 and began play in the 2011–12 season. Florida won the conference title in the inaugural season, defeating Tennessee in the championship match. Although the SEC has since expanded to 14 schools, the SCRC membership remains at 11.

=== Pacific Athletic Conference ===
Several members of the Pac-12 conference agreed in spring 2012 to form a conference beginning play in the 2012–13 season.

=== Other conferences ===
Nine D1A rugby programs currently compete in the Big Ten Universities conference, which was founded in 2012. The Red River Conference, which replaced the Allied Rugby Conference in 2014–15, is composed mostly of teams from what had been the Big 12 South from 1996 to 2011. The Southwest Conference (SWC) was created in 2011 with charter members from seven Texas schools. University of Texas was immediately added, and Texas won the conference in the inaugural 2011–12 season.

== Other competitions ==
College rugby includes rivalry trophies such as the World Cup between the University of California, Berkeley and the University of British Columbia (Canada), the Wasatch Cup between BYU and Utah, the University Cup between Texas and Texas A&M, the Koranda Cup between Yale and Princeton, and the Common Wealth Shield between Virginia and Virginia Tech.

The ACRC Bowl Series championship 15s tournament took place annually for three years from 2014 until 2016. College conference champions and select elite sides participated. The tournament provided an opportunity for teams to play outside of their conferences and was therefore relevant to establishing final fall 15s college rankings.

== Division II XVs ==
Until 2021, Division II was solely governed by USA Rugby.

=== USA Rugby ===
==== Men ====
Year	Champion	Match score	Runner-up
1994	Lock Haven University		
1995	Lock Haven University		Salisbury
1996	Salisbury		Coast Guard
1997	Salisbury		Bates
1998	UC San Diego		Oregon
1999	UC San Diego	21 – 18	Chico State
2000	Sacramento State	49 – 3	Claremont
2001	Baylor	29 – 16	Arkansas State
2002	Stanford	26 – 15	Northern Iowa
2003	Radford	32 – 22	Northern Colorado
2004	Salisbury	43 – 24	Arkansas State
2005	Northern Colorado	24 – 22	Humboldt State
2006	Coast Guard	17 – 12	Northern Colorado
2007	Middlebury	38 – 22	Arkansas State
2008	Radford	25 – 14	Utah Valley State
2009	Middlebury	27 – 11	Wisconsin
2010	Claremont Colleges	25 – 19	Temple (Claremont promoted to Div. 1)
2011	UW-Whitewater	7 – 3	Middlebury
2012	Lindenwood	50 – 12	Salisbury (Lindenwood promoted to Div. 1-AA)
2013 (Spring)	Salisbury	34 – 17	Minnesota-Duluth
2013 (Fall)	Minnesota-Duluth	31 – 7	Salisbury
2014	Minnesota-Duluth	24 – 14	UW-Whitewater
2015	Minnesota-Duluth	25 – 19	UW-Whitewater
2016	UW-Whitewater	29 – 13	Furman
2017	UW-Whitewater	34 – 27	VMI
2018	North Carolina State University	57 – 12	UW-Whitewater
2019	Queens University (NC)	74 – 8	UW-Whitewater
2020	cancelled (pandemic)		
2021	Auburn	31 – 12	Montana State (CRAA)
2022	none (NCR only)		
2023	none (NCR only)		
2024	none (NCR only)		
2025	Southern California	29 – 10	North Florida (CRAA)
2026	North Florida (CRAA)	46 – 20	California Lutheran

==== Women ====
Year	Champion	Match score	Runner-up
2000	Plymouth State		East Stroudsburg
2001	Northern Iowa		Nevada-Reno
2002	Northern Iowa		Minnesota
2003	Dayton		Northern Iowa
2004	Temple	17 – 7	Providence
2005	Providence	15 – 10	Temple
2006	UC Santa Cruz	22 – 10	Plymouth State
2007	Iowa State	26 – 19	UC Santa Cruz
2008	Shippensburg	47 – 0	Minnesota-Duluth
2009	Shippensburg	29 – 5	Stonehill
2010	Washington State	37 – 0	Temple
2011	Radcliffe	22 – 10	University of Notre Dame (South Bend, IN)
2012	Norwich	82 – 12	Winona State
2013	Washington State	60 – 5	Winona State
2014	Mary Washington	36 – 22	Cal State, Northridge
2015	Notre Dame College	69 – 10	UC-Riverside
2016	Davenport	61 – 0	USC (Note: USC substituted for Tulane, who qualified for the final but could not participate.)
2017	Davenport	71 – 5	Kennesaw State
2017–18 (fall)	Winona State	38 – 36	Vassar
(spring)	Tulane	31 – 14	Claremont Colleges
2018–19 (fall)	Vassar	50 – 13	Winona State
(spring)	Fresno State	25 – 19	Salisbury
2019–20 (fall)	Winona State	19 – 10	Colorado School of Mines
(spring)	cancelled (pandemic)		
2020–21 (fall)	cancelled (pandemic)		
(spring)	cancelled (pandemic)		
2021–22 (fall)	Vassar	74 – 5	Temple (ACRA)
(spring)	Claremont	22 – 7	San Diego State (CRAA)
2022–23 (fall)	Vassar	71 – 24	Coast Guard (CRAA/ACRA)
(spring)	Claremont	47 – 5	Howard (CRAA)
2023–24 (fall) – not held (NCR only)
(spring)	Cal Poly San Luis Obispo	104 – 5	Eckerd College (CRAA)
2024–25	Cal Poly San Luis Obispo	64 – 7	UC-Irvine (CRAA)
2025–26	San Jose State	31 – 12	UC-Irvine (CRAA)

=== National Collegiate Rugby ===
==== Men ====
Year	Champion	Match score	Runner-up
2021	Thomas More	21 – 17	Adrian
2022	Principia	47 – 16	Indiana (PA)
2023	Indiana (PA)	27 – 19	Memphis
2024	Indiana (PA)	38 – 29	Northern Iowa

==== Women ====
Year	Champion	Match score	Runner-up
2022	Wisconsin–Eau Claire	78 – 0	Marquette
2023	Wisconsin-Eau Claire	32 – 29	Vassar
2024	Vassar	24 – 5	Wisconsin-Eau Claire

== Division II Sevens ==
=== USA Rugby ===
==== Men ====
Year	Champion	Match score	Runner-up
2013	Principia	27-12	UW–Stout
2014	(moved from fall 2014 to spring 2015)		
2015	James Madison	40 – 22	Wisconsin–Whitewater
2016	Minnesota–Duluth	17- 5	Saint Louis
2017	Wisconsin–Whitewater	26 – 5	UNC Charlotte
2018	UNC Charlotte	38 – 10	Wisconsin–Whitewater
2019	North Carolina State University	28 – 12	Wisconsin–Whitewater
2020	cancelled (pandemic)		
2021	cancelled (pandemic)		
2022	Southern California	29 – 7	Memphis
2023	none		
2024	none		
2025	none		

==== Women ====
Year	Champion	Match score	Runner-up
2016	Davenport	24 – 14	Bloomsburg
2017	eligible for open division		
2018	eligible for open division		
2019	Bryant	22 – 19	Fresno State
2020	cancelled (pandemic)		
2021	cancelled (pandemic)		
2022	San Jose State	22 – 0	St. Mary's
2023	Colorado Mesa	19 – 14	San Jose State
2024	eligible for Division I/College Club tournament		
2025	eligible for Division I/College Club tournament		

=== National Collegiate Rugby ===
==== Men ====
Year	Champion	Match score	Runner-up
2022	Indiana University of Pennsylvania	17 – 7	Lander
2023	Indiana University of Pennsylvania	12 – 7	North Carolina State
2024	Maine	19 – 15	Georgetown
2025	UNC-Wilmington	24 – 12	Montana State

==== Women ====
Year	Champion	Match score	Runner-up
2023	Roger Williams	10 – 5	Colorado Mines
2024	UW–Eau Claire	22 – 5	Roger Williams
2025	Coast Guard	17 – 5	Roger Williams

== Small Colleges ==
Small College Rugby, formerly known as Division III, is governed by the National Collegiate Rugby Organization, formerly the National Small College Rugby Organization (NSCRO). In 2020, NSCRO re-branded as National Collegiate Rugby. The National Small College Rugby Organization was created to give a competitive outlet to small colleges which would not otherwise have an opportunity to compete on a national stage. Each year, the NSCRO hosts rugby tournaments for men's and women's college teams, and during 2006–2011 it also conducted a Division IV Women's college tournament.

=== Men's 15s ===
Year	Champion	Match score	Runner-up
2002	Western Carolina University		Stonehill College
2003	Furman University		Stonehill College
2004	Furman University		Central Connecticut State
2005	Furman University		Duke University
2006	Bentley University		The Citadel
2007	Bentley University	11 – 10	Furman University
2008	Plymouth State Univ	22 – 15	Furman University
2009	Coastal Carolina	36 – 15	SUNY Oswego
2010	Penn State Berks	11 – 6	Keene State
2011	Longwood University	36 – 27	Occidental College
2012	Salve Regina	22 – 15	Cal Maritime
2013	St. John's (Minn.)	31 – 16	Duke
2014	St. John's (Minn.)	37 – 25	New England College
2015	New England College	32 – 15	Mt. Saint Mary's (MD)
2016	Mt. Saint Mary's (MD)	26 – 19	Claremont Colleges
2017	Claremont Colleges	65 – 10	Tufts
2018	Iowa Central Community College	64 – 11	Claremont Colleges
2019	Claremont Colleges	57 – 17	Christendom College
2020	cancelled (pandemic)		
2021	Christendom College	34 – 29	New Mexico Tech
2022	Cal Poly Humboldt	20 – 15	Wayne State
2023	Babson	27 – 23	Wayne State
2024	Wayne State	27 – 8	Holy Cross

=== Women's 15s ===
Year	Champion	Match score	Runner-up
2002–03	College of New Jersey		University of Maine
2003–04	Fordham University		Susquehanna University
2004–05	Castleton State		Susquehanna University
2005–06	Babson University		Ursinus College
2006–07 (Spring)	Stonehill College		Penn
2007 (Fall)	Stonehill College		Marist College
2008	Bryant University		Gettysburg College
2009	MIT		East Stroudsburg University
2010	Bentley University		Drexel University
2011	Carleton		Lock Haven
2012	Wayne State (Nebraska)		Roger Williams
2013	Wayne State (Nebraska)		Smith
2014	Roger Williams	45 – 10	Sacred Heart
2015	MSU-Moorhead	44 – 24	Colgate
2016	Wayne State (Nebraska)	11 – 0	Colgate
2017	Wayne State (Nebraska)	46 – 26	Bentley
2018	Wayne State (Nebraska)	67 – 12	Catholic University
2019	Wayne State (Nebraska)	90 – 14	Endicott College
2020	cancelled (pandemic)		
2021	Wayne State (Nebraska)	72 – 10	SUNY–Cortland
2022	Endicott	24 – 12	Lee University
2023	St. Bonaventure	22 – 17	Wisconsin-Platteville
2024	Endicott	22 – 15	Colorado School of Mines

=== Men's 7s ===
Year	Champion	Match score	Runner-up
2013	Occidental	28 – 15	North Florida
2014	New England College	22 – 14	New Mexico Highlands
2015	New Mexico Highlands	22 – 19	New England College
2016	New Mexico Highlands	31 – 7	St. Mary's College (MD)
2017	Christendom College	24 – 19 (OT)	St. Mary's College (MD)
2018	Claremont Colleges	17 – 0	Salve Regina
2019 vacated, ineligible players	New Mexico Highlands	17 – 12	Claremont Colleges
2020	cancelled (pandemic)		
2021	cancelled (pandemic)		
2022	New Mexico Tech	26 – 10	Christendom College
2023	Babson	17 – 0	Springfield
2024	Slippery Rock	19 – 12	St. Thomas (Minn.)
2025	UW-Eau Claire	22 – 0	Springfield

=== Women's 7s ===
Year	Champion	Match score	Runner-up
2014	Wayne State College (Nebraska)	24 – 7	South Dakota State
2015	Wayne State College	22 – 17	Mt. Saint Mary's
2016	Wayne State College	20 – 0	Colorado College
2017	Colgate	15 – 12	Wayne State College
2018	Wayne State College	24 – 5	Lee
2019	Wayne State College	31 – 7	Rochester
2020	cancelled (pandemic)		
2021	cancelled (pandemic)		
2022	Chicago	10 – 5	South Dakota
2023	Endicott	15 – 10	Lee
2024	Yale	31 – 7	Gannon University
2025	Endicott	32 – 0	Baldwin Wallace

=== Division IV ===
The National Small College Rugby Organization conducted a women's-only Division IV championship from 2006 to 2011.

Year	Champion	Runner-up
2006	University of Rhode Island	Ursinus College
2007	Roger Williams University	Gettysburg College
2008	College of the Holy Cross	Albright College
2009	Drexel University	Wentworth Institute of Technology
2010	Lock Haven University	Mount Holyoke College
2011	Johnson State College	Albright College

== Injuries ==
In the US, college rugby has much higher injury rates than college football. Rugby union has similar injury types to American football but with more common injuries of arms.

== See also ==
- MLR Draft
- Major League Rugby
- College athletics
  - College football
  - College basketball
  - College baseball
  - College ice hockey
  - College soccer in the United States
  - College lacrosse
- Intercollegiate sports team champions
- Concussions in rugby union
- Rugby union in the United States
- History of rugby union in the United States
