= Pacific Western Rugby Conference =

- Founded: 2012
- Sports fielded: college rugby
- No. of teams: 7

The Pacific Western Rugby Conference (PWRC) is a college rugby conference in the United States. The conference spans northern California and northern Nevada.

== Members ==
- Chico State University
- Fresno State University
- University of Nevada, Reno
- San Francisco State University
- San Josè State University
- UC Santa Cruz
- Stanford University
