= ACRC Bowl Series =

Bowl Series
- Current season, competition or edition: 2022
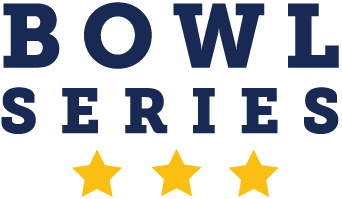
- Sport: Rugby union
- First season: 2014
- Folded: 2016; 10 years ago
- Organizing body: URugby
- Website: bowlseries.com

The Bowl Series Rugby, formerly American Collegiate Rugby Championship (ACRC) Bowl Series, was an annual college rugby competition featuring top national teams playing fifteen-a-side rugby. The inaugural event was held in Charlotte, N.C. in November 2014; this 20-team bowl competition occurred at Charlotte’s Rugby Athletic Center, a sports and events venue located three miles from downtown.

The tournament was managed by URugby, a division of Sevens Sports LLC, a sports event management and marketing company specializing in the sport of rugby.

== History ==
The 2014 ACRC Bowl Series included nine collegiate bowl games with 18 teams (including nine conference champions) over two days. Participating conference champions were Clemson, American International College, Stony Brook, Bowling Green, Life University, West Virginia, Army, South Carolina, and North Texas. The AIC-Bowling Green game was named the 2014 College Game of the Year by Goff Rugby Report.

The 2015 ACRC Bowl Series were memorable, marked by close contests and dramatic finishes, including the down-to-the-wire Southeastern Collegiate Rugby Conference Championship and an Indiana-Kutztown game Alex Goff called an "instant classic". With two tournament locations, The University of Delaware visited Iona College's campus for one of ten bowl matches in 2015 while mine other matches were held in Charlotte, North Carolina.

In 2016, the tournament changed its name to the Bowl Series Rugby. This created a more inclusive conference, which allowed high school 7s matches played during halftime of the collegiate 15s matches. Hosted at Iona College, the 2016 Bowl Series produced more classic matches on its opening day than previous years as the hosts Iona College facing off with ECRC champions American International College (AIC) with "an aggressive, hard-charging defense".

== 2016 Bowl Series Rugby ==
The 2016 Bowl Series returned to Iona College, New Rochelle, New York on November 19 and 20, for a 2-day 24-team collegiate championship event.

The 2016 Bowl Series hosted six collegiate 15s matches and six high school 7s matches. Featuring six returning teams from the 2014 Bowl Series and the 2015 Bowl Series, the tournament guaranteed the electric passion of previous years. Returning teams included: American International College, Iona College, Stony Brook University, Rutgers University, University of Delaware and University of Massachusetts.

=== 2016 Bowl Matches ===
- Iona College v American International College
- Temple University vs University of Mary Washington
- Stony Brook University vs Rutgers University
- University of Delaware vs Fordham University
- University of Massachusetts vs University at Buffalo
- Loyola Maryland vs Binghamton University
- HS Sevens: Eagle Impact Rugby Academy v Play Rugby
- HS Sevens: FASNY and KEIO Academy v Greenwich HS
- HS Sevens: NYRFC v Fairfield

== 2015 American Collegiate Rugby Championship (ACRC) Bowl Series ==
The 2015 ACRC Bowl Series took place Nov 20-21. The line-up of teams included the then-#1 and #2 ranked college rugby teams in the U.S., American International College and Indiana University, and five of the then-current Top 10.

Nine of the 10 matches took place at the Rugby Athletic Center in Charlotte. The tenth, dubbed the Quinn For the Win Ice Bucket Challenge, took place at Iona College in New York. The game between Iona College and the University of Delaware raised money for former rugby player and Ice Bucket Challenge co-founder Pat Quinn's Quinn For the Win foundation, which raises money for ALS research.

=== 2015 Southeast Collegiate Rugby Conference Championship ===
The 2015 Bowl Series was the site of the SCRC championship game between Tennessee and South Carolina. Tennessee won the game with a dramatic last-minute try to secure the 23-22 victory.

=== 2015 Bowl Matches ===
- University of Massachusetts vs NC State University
- Syracuse vs Notre Dame College
- Boston College vs University of Alabama
- St. Bonaventure University vs Western Michigan University
- Iona College vs University of Delaware
- University of North Texas vs Rutgers University
- Stony Brook University vs University of Cincinnati
- American International College vs Clemson University
- University of Tennessee vs University of South Carolina
- Kutztown University vs Indiana University

== 2014 American Collegiate Rugby Championship (ACRC) Bowl Series ==
The inaugural American Collegiate Rugby Championships Bowl Series came to Charlotte, N.C on November 21–23, 2014. This high-level collegiate rugby competition hosted a series of matches in traditional bowl format, bringing the very best college rugby teams from around the country to Charlotte’s Rugby Athletic Center. The 2014 ACRC Bowl Series featured eight championship bowl games over three days. Many of the participating teams were selected based on their finish in their respective collegiate conferences.

=== 2014 participating ACRC conferences and teams ===
- Atlantic Coast Rugby League (Clemson, North Carolina State)
- Big Ten (Michigan)
- East Coast Rugby Conference (American International College, Boston College, UMass)
- Empire Rugby Conference (Stony Brook)
- Mid American Conference (Bowling Green, Western Michigan)
- Mid South Conference (Life University)
- Keystone Rugby Conference (West Virginia)
- Rugby East Conference (Kutztown, Army, Iona)
- Southeastern Collegiate Rugby Conference (South Carolina)
- Southwest Collegiate Rugby Conference (North Texas, Texas State)
