= 1991 National Collegiate Rugby Championship =

Tournament details
- Tournament format(s): Knockout
- Date: May 4 – 5, 1991

Tournament statistics
- Teams: 4
- Matches played: 4

Final
- Venue: Houston, TX
- Champions: UC Berkeley (8th title)
- Runners-up: Army

The 1991 National Collegiate Rugby Championship was the twelfth edition of the official national championship for intercollegiate rugby. The tournament, sponsored by Steinlager, took place at Cullen Park in Houston, Texas from May 4–5. UC Berkeley won their eighth title with a victory over Army. Ohio State placed third for the second year in a row. Masanao Morimoto of Berkeley was named Most Valuable Forward while Gravelle Pierre of Army was Most Valuable Back.

== Venue ==
Texas
Cullen Park	1991 National Collegiate Rugby Championship is located in Texas
Houston, Texas	1991 National Collegiate Rugby Championship is located in Texas
Capacity:	1991 National Collegiate Rugby Championship is located in Texas

== Participants ==
Army Black Nights

Qualified for the National Championship by advancing from the Eastern College Championship on December 1–2 at Orlando, FL.

- Army 46-9 Loyola of Maryland
- Army 50-6 Maryland

Roster:
Coaches- Michael W. Mahan, Brian O'Gorman, Dave Ross
Captain- Vinnie Torza (Center)
Record- 19–0
Bill Besterman (Prop), Jeff Chuck (Scrumhalf), Tony DeToto (Scrumhalf), Joe Frescura (Hooker), Martin Guillen (Prop), Eric Hall (Flyhalf), Chris Harlan (Lock), Lance Kohler (Hooker), Joe Kremer (Flanker), Muggs Malinowski (#8), Bill Marshall (Wing), Mike Mazzacco (Wing), Mike McKay (Flanker), Dennis McKernan (#8), Bob Minner (Flanker), Robert Moseley (Flyhalf), Scott Painter (Fullback), Gravelle Pierre (Wing), Mike Roberts (Prop), John Slater (Lock), Garth Yarnell (Center), Peter Young (Wing).

Ohio State

Qualified for the National Championship by winning the Midwest Universities Cup on April 20–21 in Columbus, OH.

- Ohio State 21–0 Iowa
- Ohio State 21–0 Mankato State
- Ohio State 9–6 University of Cincinnati
- Ohio State 3-0 Bowling Green

Roster:
Coaches- Barry Ferguson, Steve Finkel, Charlie Schubert, Mr. Perry
Captains- Mike Vogel, Dave Canning (#8)
Record- 6–1–1 (15–2–2)
Dan Berner (Hooker), Ron Bowers (Center), Joe Bradley (Fullback), Mike Cline (Lock), Mike Dresser (Flyhalf), Scott Dye (Wing), Shawn Fox (Lock), Kent Garbee (Flyhalf), Mark Griffiths (Scrumhalf), Ben Hadley (Fullback), Russ Howland (Center), Mike Hudak (Hooker), Mark Mann (Wing), Pat Marek (Prop), Brent Mathie (Center), Takahiro Matsubara (Wing), Dan McBride (Prop), Jim Merritt (Prop), Tim Peters (Wing), Corey Perry (Lock), Eric Pool (Prop), Tom Roe (Flanker), Tim Rudolph (Flanker), Chad Schneider (Flanker), Jim Skowron (Lock), Phil Vogel (Flanker), Tim Walsh (Scrumhalf), Gil Wright (Center).

Wyoming

Qualified for the National Championship by winning the Western Collegiate Championship on April 13–14 in Lawrence, KS.

- Wyoming 23-4 University of Missouri
- Wyoming 9-6 Nebraska University
- Wyoming 9-6 Air Force (triple overtime)

Roster:
Coach- Mr. Blanche
Captains- Doug Bailey (Lock)
Record- 20–1–1
Josh Armogost (Wing), Tom Baker (Flanker), Adam Beckman (Prop), Bill Bettas (Scrumhalf), Collin Bonner (Prop), Dave Finoff (Flanker), Dan Frey (Hooker), Rick Guermendi (Flyhalf), Will Harris (#8), Vince Kalkowski (Fullback), Travis Kelsey (Prop), Tim Lawrence (Center), Scot Mortimer (Flyhalf), Kayode Okesanjo (Flanker), Brian O'Neill (Fullback), Jack Peden (Wing), Peter Proffit (Lock), Rob Roth (Lock), Eric Smith (Scrumhalf), Jason Tangeman (Center), Tim Wilcox (Wing), Walter Wilcox (Flanker).

UC Berkeley

Qualified from Pacific Coast College Championships on April 19–21 in Palo Alto, CA.

- UC Berkeley 30-0 UC Santa Barbara
- UC Berkeley 20-6 CSU Long Beach
- UC Berkeley 38-6 Stanford

Roster:
Coach- Jack Clark
Captain-Greg Chenu (Center)
Record- 7-0 (19–1)
Andre Bachelet (Scrumhalf), Christian Bachelet (Flyhalf), John Ball (Center), Jon Beck (Lock), Mark Bingham (#8), Tom Chapman (Lock), Jeff Chenu (#8), David Codevilla (Lock), Peter Codevilla (Lock), Charles Foster (Hooker), Frank Grant (Wing), Eric Harmon (Flyhalf), Sean Hoover (Center), Tim Hoover (Center), Pat Keegan (Fullback), Chris Kennerly (Prop), Chris King (Flanker), Chester Koh (Hooker), Ray Lehner (Prop), David Liebowitz (Prop), Rob Lumkong (#8), Joshua Martin (Flanker), Kevin Mein (Prop), Masanao Morimoto (Flanker), Tom Motes (Fullback), Matt Palamountain (Wing), Doug Pearson (Flanker), Ed Schram (Center), Wade Sherman (Prop), Faasamala Tagaloa (Wing), Kester Wise (Flyhalf).

== Bracket ==
Regional Semifinal
April 20 - Palo Alto, CA
UC Berkeley	20
Long Beach	6
April 20 - Palo Alto, CA
Stanford	13
Santa Clara	6
April 13 - Lawrence, KS
Wyoming	9
Nebraska U	6
April 13 - Lawrence, KS
Air Force	29
Texas U	4
December 1 - Orlando, FL
Army	46
Loyola	9
December 1 - Orlando, FL
Maryland	7
Central Florida	6
April 20 - Columbus, OH
Ohio State	9
U. of Cincinnati	6
April 20 - Columbus, OH
Bowling Green	10
Penn State	7

Regional Final
April 21 - Palo Alto, CA
UC Berkeley	38
Stanford	6
April 14 - Lawrence, KS
Wyoming	9
Air Force	6
December 2 - Orlando, FL
Army	50
Maryland	6
April 21 - Columbus, OH
Ohio State	3
Bowling Green	0

National Semifinal
May 4 – Houston, TX
UC Berkeley (Pacific)	49
Wyoming (West)	11
May 4 – Houston, TX
Army (East)	42
Ohio State (Midwest)	11

National Final
May 5 – Houston, TX
UC Berkeley	20
Army	14
Third place
May 5 – Houston, TX
Ohio State	19
Wyoming	15

== Semifinals ==
4 May 1991
12:00 PM

UC Berkeley	49–11	Wyoming
Try: Andre Bachelet (2); Fas Tagaloa (2); J.Chenu; Josh Martin; Pearson; Con: Andre Bachelet (2); Motes (4); Pen: Andre Bachelet; Motes; Drop: C. Bachelet		Try: O'Neill; Frey; Con: Mortimer

Houston, TX
Referee: Bob Loftus (Midwest)

4 May 1991
2:00 PM

Army	42–11	Ohio State
Try: Yarnell (2); Slater; Hall; Pierre; Minner; Con: Painter (6); Pen: Painter (2)		Try: Canning (2); Pen: Bradley

Houston, TX
Referee: Don Reordan (USARFU)

== Third place ==
5 May 1991
10:30 AM

Ohio State	19–15	Wyoming
Try: Mann; Matsubara; Walsh; Bradley; Pen: Howland		Try: O'Neill (2); Con: Mortimer (2); Pen: Mortimer

Houston, TX
Referee: Bob Loftus (Midwest)

== Final ==
5 May 1991
12:30 PM

UC Berkeley	20–14	Army
Try: Rob Lumkong 30'; Masanao Morimoto 56' c Andre Bachelet 73'; Con: Andre Bachelet; Pen: Tom Motes 54', 66'		Try: Gravelle Pierre 38'; Scott Painter 40+'; Pen: Scott Painter 15', 27'

Houston, TX
Attendance: 2000
Referee: Don Reordan (USARFU)

== College All–Stars ==
The 1991 Collegiate All–Star Championship took place Daly Field in Brighton, MA from June 14–16. Similar to the Inter Territorial Tournaments for club teams, the college competition is divided into geographic unions and used to select the All–American team that goes on to play other junior national rugby teams. In the final, the Pacific Coast RFU defeated the Eastern RU. The final standings were 1st Pacific, 2nd East, 3rd Midwest and 4th West. Andre Bachelet, scrumhalf for UC Berkeley, was MVP back and Ashley Hale, #8 for San Diego State, was MVP forward.

14 June 1991

East	27–4	West
Try: Jeff Rank 23' c Dan Cockerell 52' c Steve Cohn 60' c Eric Chehab 70' c Con: Steve Laake (3); Todd Merolla (1); Pen: Steve Laake		Try: Steve Robke 50'

Brighton, MA
Referee: Peter Meisenzahl (NERFU)

14 June 1991

Pacific Coast	43–6	Midwest
Try: Ashley Hale 2' c Jon Beck 9'; Andre Bachelet 12'; Kevin Robinson 30' c Craig Levine 45'; Ed Schram c penalty try 68' c Andre Bachelet 73'; Con: Jon Hinkin; Pen: Jon Hinkin 32'		Pen: Russ Howland 14', 59'

Brighton, MA
Referee: Scott Miller (ERRFU)

15 June 1991

East	23–23	Midwest
Try: Lauren Rose 64'; Rob Getreu; Steve Cohn c Con: Rafael Gonzalez; Pen: Rafael Gonzalez 3', 11', 27'		Try: Tony Crowe c Dave Gosch 35' c Brent Hinz 60'; Kent Lowe; Con: Drew Little; Pen: Drew Little 23'

Brighton, MA
Referee: Peter Meisenzahl (NERFU)

15 June 1991

Pacific Coast	27–13	West
Try: Daryl Steinbeck 3' c Kester Wise 13'; Jens Brock–Utne 16'; Jens Brock–Utne 30'; Jens Brock–Utne 71' c Con: Eric Harmon (1); Jon Hinkin (1); Pen: Eric Harmon 1H'		Try: Phil Olson (2); Con: John Tajkowski (1); Pen: John Tajkowski 25'

Brighton, MA
Referee: Ed Browder (NERFU)

16 June 1991

Midwest	16–8	West
Try: Drew Little 15', 34'; Craig Mauer; Dave Canning		Try: Allan Mottram 43'; John Tajkowski

Brighton, MA
Referee: Scott Miller (ERRFU)

16 June 1991

Pacific Coast	22–19	East
Try: Dean Toohey 5'; Ashley Hale 35' c Dan Cockerell 58' c Con: Andre Bachelet; Pen: Andre Bachelet 49'; Jon Hinkin; Jon Hinkin 80+'; Drop: Kevin Robinson 32'		Try: Lauren Rose 24' c Wally Lester 52'; Con: Steve Laake; Pen: Steve Laake 8'; Todd Merolla 62'; Drop: Todd Merolla 15'

Brighton, MA
Referee: Ed Browder (NERFU)

Champions: Pacific Coast College All–Stars
Staff: Jerry Figone (Manager), Dale Toohey (Coach), Chris Byrne (Asst. Coach)
Captain: Dean Toohey–Flanker (Long Beach State)
Roster: Andre Bachelet-Scrumhalf (UC Berkeley), Jon Beck-Lock (UC Berkeley), Scott Bracken-Prop (San Diego State), Jens Brock-Utne–Flanker (St. Mary's), Greg Chenu-Center (UC Berkeley), David Codevilla-Lock (UC Berkeley), Mike Conn-Prop (Santa Clara), Charlie Foster-Hooker (UC Berkeley), Erich Gross-Lock (San Diego State), Ashley Hale-#8 (San Diego State), Eric Harmon-Fullback (UC Berkeley), Jon Hinkin-Wing (St. Mary's), Craig Hutchinson-Lock (Long Beach State), Chris King-Flanker (UC Berkeley), Ray Lehner-Prop/Lock (UC Berkeley), Craig Levine-Hooker (San Diego State), Alex Lowe-Wing (Cal Poly SLO), Josh Martin-Flanker (UC Berkeley), Masanao Morimoto-Flanker (UC Berkeley), Chris Motes-Fullback (UC Berkeley), Adam Ortlieb-Prop (San Diego State), Todd Perruchon-Scrumhalf (Humboldt State), Kevin Robinson-Flyhalf (Long Beach State), Ed Schram-Center (UC Berkeley), Pete Smith-Flyhalf (UC Santa Barbara), Daryl Steinbeck-Center (Cal Poly SLO), Faasamala Tagaloa-Wing (UC Berkeley), Kester Wise–Wing (UC Berkeley).

== Women's College Championship ==
The 1991 Women's Collegiate Championship took place at Alexandria, VA from May 25–26. Air Force was the champion of this first edition. Boston College qualified by winning the East Coast Territorial championship. Princeton was the runner–up at the Eastern Territorial. University of Montana (UM Betterside) represented the Pacific. University of Michigan represented the Midwest. With five teams, two teams were paired in a first round match (Boston/Montana) while the remaining three teams (Air Force/Michigan/Princeton) played a round robin. Air Force scrumhalf Margo Willoughby was named Most Valuable Player.

First round (BC/Montana)

- Boston College 12–0 Montana

First Round (AF/Michigan/Princeton)

- Air Force 30–0 Michigan
- Princeton W–L Michigan
- Air Force 6–3 Princeton

Semifinals

- Boston College 7–3 Princeton
- Air Force 38–0 Montana

=== Final ===
26 May 1991

Boston College	0–12	Air Force
		Try: Karen Perez 3' pushover try 10'; Karen Perez

Alexandria, VA
Referee: Laurel Lockett (Florida)

Lineups:
Air Force– Vern Avery (Coach), Lisa Viertel, Bridget Groat, Laura Piper, Heidi Cizan, Tammy Brodtke, Anne Williams, Michelle Smith, Maggie Dawson, Margo Willoughby, Dana Teagarden, Tracy Hubbard, Darlene Schultz, Joyce Elmore, Karen Perez, Shelly Ripple (Anna Bailey).
Boston College– Ken Daly (Coach), Mendes, Weber, Vande Haar, Oldenhoff, Ives, Katherine Harrison, H. Smith, Laura Kiley, Cathy Darrow, Nancy Sulick, Weber, Roche, R. Jackson, Krackauer, Rogers.

Champions: Air Force
Staff: Vern Avery (Coach), Judy Graffis (Asst. Coach)
Captains: Margo Willoughby, Darlene Schultz

== See also ==
1991 National Rugby Championships
