= 1972 National Rugby Championships =

Tournament details
- Tournament format(s): Knockout
- Date: 1972

Tournament statistics

Final

The 1972 National Rugby Championships included the first Collegiate tournament and the 14th edition of the Monterey National.

== College ==
The 1972 National Collegiate Rugby championship hosted by Washington and Lee University in Lexington, VA from April 29–30. Palmer College of Chiropractic were the champions. Navy was runner-up.
Results:

Championship Bracket

First round
April 29 - Lexington, VA
Palmer	36
Kentucky	0
April 29 - Lexington, VA
Texas	13
Michigan	10
April 29 - Lexington, VA
Louisiana State	16
Brown	12
April 29 - Lexington, VA
Georgia	18
Harvard	13
April 29 - Lexington, VA
Navy	12
Notre Dame	7
April 29 - Lexington, VA
Virginia	19
Florida	7
April 29 - Lexington, VA
Washington & Lee	3
Princeton	29
April 29 - Lexington, VA
South Carolina	35
Tennessee	3

Quarterfinal
April 29 - Lexington, VA
Palmer	53
Texas	6
April 29 - Lexington, VA
Louisiana State	14
Georgia	8
April 29 - Lexington, VA
Navy	10
Virginia	6
April 29 - Lexington, VA
Princeton	17
South Carolina	10

Semifinal
April 30 - Lexington, VA
Palmer	24
Louisiana State	6
April 30 - Lexington, VA
Navy	13
Princeton	12

Final
April 30 - Lexington, VA
Palmer	28
Navy	17
Third place
April 30 - Lexington, VA
Louisiana State	W
Princeton	L

=== Final ===
30 April 1972
2:00PM

Palmer	28–17	Navy
Try: Ian McCallum

Lexington, VA

Champions: Palmer College of Chiropractic
Coach: Dr. Thomas Louw
Captain: John Loveday

== Monterey National Championship ==
Program cover for 1972 tournament.

The 1972 Monterey National Rugby Championship was the 14th edition of the tournament and was considered to be the de facto national championship. This event took place at Collins Polo Field in Pebble Beach, CA from March 18–19. This year the tournament increased to 32 teams. The Hastings Outstanding player award went to Jerry Walters of Santa Monica. Lindy Forrest of the University of Washington won the first annual Drop Kick competition with Brent Barry of the Peninsula Ramblers coming in second. UCLA went 5–0 to take first place.

First round

18 March 1972 1	Peninsula Ramblers	9-0	SEALS/UDT	Pebble Beach
7:00AM				Stadium: Field 1

18 March 1972 2	San Jose State	7-0	Cisco's RC	Pebble Beach
7:00AM				Stadium: Field 2

18 March 1972 3	UC Davis	0-0 (W–L p)	U. of Washington	Pebble Beach
7:00AM				Stadium: Field 3

18 March 1972 4	North Counties	12-6	OMBAC	Pebble Beach
7:00AM				Stadium: Field 4

18 March 1972 5	Stanford University	3-4	Occidental College	Pebble Beach
7:30AM				Stadium: Field 1

18 March 1972 6	Sea Hawks	0-12	Western Washington	Pebble Beach
7:30AM				Stadium: Field 3

18 March 1972 7	San Francisco RC	16-3	California Lutheran	Pebble Beach
7:30AM				Stadium: Field 4

18 March 1972 8	Chico RC	4-4 (L–W p)	CSU Los Angeles	Pebble Beach
7:30AM				Stadium: Field 2

18 March 1972 9	UC Berkeley	7-0	Oregon State	Pebble Beach
8:00AM				Stadium: Field 1

18 March 1972 10	Pensacola Navy	0-6	Old Gaels	Pebble Beach
8:00AM				Stadium: Field 2

18 March 1972 11	Finlanders RC	3-3 (L–W p)	St. Mary's College	Pebble Beach
8:00AM				Stadium: Field 3

18 March 1972 12	Portland RC	0-6	BATS	Pebble Beach
8:00AM				Stadium: Field 4

18 March 1972 13	Old Puget Sound Beach	4-0	Monterey RC	Pebble Beach
8:30AM				Stadium: Field 1

18 March 1972 14	Palo Alto RC	9-3	UC Santa Barbara	Pebble Beach
8:30AM				Stadium: Field 3

18 March 1972 15	X–O RC	0-0 (W–L p)	San Luis Obispo RC	Pebble Beach
8:30AM				Stadium: Field 4

18 March 1972 16	Capitol RC	0-14	UCLA	Pebble Beach
8:30AM				Stadium: Field 2

Championship Bracket

Second Round; March 18
1	Peninsula Ramblers	14
San Jose State	0
UC Davis	10
North Counties	5
Occidental College	6
Western Washington	16
San Francisco RC	4
4	CSU Los Angeles	9
3	UC Berkeley	6
Old Gaels	0
St. Mary's	6
BATS	0
Old Puget Sound	18
Palo Alto RC	6
X–O RC	3
2	UCLA	10

Quarterfinals; March 18
1	Peninsula Ramblers	4
UC Davis	3
Western Washington	3
4	CSU Los Angeles	0
3	UC Berkeley	4
St. Mary's	0
Old Puget Sound	0
2	UCLA	15

Semifinals; March 18
1	Peninsula Ramblers	18
Western Washington	3
3	UC Berkeley	6
2	UCLA	9

Final; March 19
1	Peninsula Ramblers	6
2	UCLA	16
Third place
Western Washington	6
3	UC Berkeley	27

=== Final ===
19 March 1972
2:20PM

Peninsula Ramblers	6–16	UCLA
Pen: Ken Berry (2)		Try: Jeff Todd 79'; Pen: David Sugden 1H', 2H', 70', 72'

Collins Polo Field

Champions: UCLA
Coach: Dennis Storer
Captain: David Sugden
Roster: Ron Andris, Steve Auerback, Bruce Barnes, Bruce Berg, Gordon Bosserman, Tim Desmond, Matt Fayle, James Grant, Tom Hanrahan, Gary James, Mike Mears, Gordon Moir, Skip Niebauer, Vincent Pasquariello, Mike Pavich, Bob Rogers, Rob Scribner, Greg Steel, David Stephenson, Craig Sweeney, Jeff Todd, Robert Thrussel, John Williams.

5th–8th
L33	UC Davis	3*
L37	CSU LA	3
L41	St. Mary's	6
L42	Old Puget Sound	12

Fifth place
W50	UC Davis	6
W54	Old Puget Sound	15
Seventh place
L50	CSU LA	12
L54	St. Mary's	17

*Advanced on kicks

Thirteenth
Field 2 10:15AM
W46	San Jose St	3
W56	Old Gaels	20
Fifteenth
Field 3 12:45PM
L46	Occidental	13
L56	Palo Alto	16

13th–16th
Field 2 2:50PM
L34	San Jose St	9
L35	Occidental	0
Field 4 4:30PM
L39	Old Gaels	10
L43	Palo Alto	6

9th–16th
Field 2 12:20PM
L17	San Jose State	3
L18	North Counties	6
Field 3 12:20PM
L21	Occidental	6
L22	San Francisco	12
Field 3 1:10PM
L25	Old Gaels	17
L26	BATS	21
Field 3 2:00PM
L29	Palo Alto	6
L30	X–O RC	10

9th–12th
Field 1 2:50PM
W34	North Counties	6
W35	San Francisco	10
Field 3 4:30PM
W39	BATS	10
W43	X–O RC	4

Ninth
Field 2 12:45PM
W45	San Francisco	6
W55	BATS	3
Eleventh
Field 2 11:30AM
L45	North Counties	3
L55	X–O RC	20
