= 1995 National Collegiate Rugby Championship =

Tournament details
- Tournament format(s): Knockout
- Date: May 6 – 7, 1995

Tournament statistics
- Teams: 4
- Matches played: 4

Final
- Venue: Berkeley, CA
- Champions: UC Berkeley (12th title)
- Runners-up: Air Force

The 1995 National Collegiate Rugby Championship was the sixteenth edition of the official national championship for intercollegiate rugby. The Men's tournament took place on Witter Rugby Field at the University of California at Berkeley from May 6–7. UC Berkeley won their twelfth title with a victory over Air Force.

== Venue ==
California
Witter Rugby Field	1995 National Collegiate Rugby Championship is located in California
Berkeley, CA	1995 National Collegiate Rugby Championship is located in California
Capacity: 6900	1995 National Collegiate Rugby Championship is located in California

== Participants ==
Army Black Nights

Qualified for the National Championship by advancing from the Eastern College Championship on December 3–4 at the Fairgrounds in Orlando, FL.

- Army 23-10 George Mason
- Army 27-20 Navy

Colors–Black, Gold, Gray
Record- 21–1–3
Coach- Mike Mahan (Head Coach), Alan Dingfelder, Dennis Bottomley
Captain- Nathan Reel (Stand Off), Brett Adams (Prop)
Roster:
Richard Anselmi (Hooker), Jon Bunch (Prop), Peter Bylone (Center), Scott Chance (Hooker), Mickey Cho (Second Row), William Colbert (Flanker), Matthew Cromly (Center), Eric Harmon (Flanker), Gerald Himes (Prop), Mark Hoovestol (Prop), Jason Jefferis (Center), Devon Knox (Flanker), Alex Ladage (Stand Off), Thomas Mahoney (#8), John Murphy (Scrumhalf), Ross Nelson (Hooker), Gabe Pennone (Fullback), Brian Perez (Wing), Kevin Releford (Second Row), Jonathon Roginski (Second Row), Joe Schino (Fullback), Anthony Shepard (Wing), Joseph Swiecki (Flanker), Eric Vanek (Scrumhalf), David Waldron (Wing), Emett White (#8), David Wimberley (Second Row), Ryan Worthan (Center).

Penn State Nittany Lions

Qualified for the National Championship by winning the Midwest Universities Cup on November 5–6 in Bowling Green, OH.

- Penn State 22–18 Notre Dame
- Penn State 43-14 Miami (OH)

Colors– Navy, White
Record- 16–1–2
Coaches- Terry Ryland, Frasier Grigor, Alun Hardman
Captain- Ryan Nagle (Scrumhalf)
Roster:
Brian Anson (Inside Center), Troy Bartley (Prop), Michael Benedetto (Prop), Dan Brown (Wing), Todd Buelow (Flanker), Mark Carroll (Flanker), Chuck Caruso (Flyhalf), Matthew Deviney (Fullback), Steven Dick (Prop), Michael Elgin (Flanker/Wing), Mike Feightner (#8), Greg Gooch (Second Row), A. Frasier Grigor Jr. (Flanker), Chris Keegan (Hooker), Andrew Lewis (Second Row), Jon Lutton (Second Row), Hugh McGilligan (Flyhalf), Edmund Mehlig (Hooker), Todd Metcalf (Lock), Paul Sochocky (Wing), Jeffrey Thompson (Fullback), Wayne White (Outside Center), Iwon Williams (Scrumhalf), Marlon Zelaya (Prop).

Air Force Zoomies

Qualified for the National Championship by winning the Western Collegiate Championship at Milne Stadium #2 from April 14–16 in Albuquerque, NM.

- Air Force 57–0 South Dakota State
- Air Force 30-0 Colorado State
- Air Force 20-12 NE Missouri State

Colors– Blue/Silver
Record- 9–0
Coaches- Jonathan Finley, Chuck Milligan, Mike Junk
Captains- Rex Michael Bellinger (Lock), Jim Lamar (Fullback)
Roster:
V. Scott Arbogast (Outside Center), Chad Balettie (Loose Prop), T. Jay Bice (Wing), Nate Downing (Tight Prop), Jeff Evans (Wing), Vernon Fletcher (Flanker), Mike Foutch (Hooker), Jason Frazee (Lock), Bryan Green (Scrumhalf), Alan Hook (Flyhalf), Grayling Jones (Flanker), Matthew Louse (Hooker), Daniel Marine (Prop), Jason Mock (Inside Center), Johnny Nemecek (#8), Michael Nolan (Prop), Brian Scafer (Flanker), Marc A. Tourville (Wing), Scott A. Trinrud (Flanker), Brad Turvin (Scrumhalf).

UC Berkeley

Qualified from Pacific Coast College Championships on April 21–23 in San Diego, CA.

- UC Berkeley 36-5 San Diego
- UC Berkeley 26-0 UC Davis
- UC Berkeley 17-13 Stanford

Colors– Blue, Gold
Record- 14–3
Coaches- Jack Clark, Jerry Figone, Kevin Higgins, Ray Lehner, Dan Porter
Captains-Peter Codevilla (Lock)
Roster:
Chris Andrews (Wing), Tyler Applegate (Wing), Doug Anthrop (Center), Jeff Arreguy (Lock), John Ball (Center), Eric Brandon (Lock), Ovie Brume (Wing), Jonah Cave (Flanker), Ted Callagy (Prop), Chris Carrigg (Center), Kevin Dalzell (Scrumhalf), Jayson Davidson (Hooker), Dave DePianto (Center), Byron Deeter (Prop), Roy Dimalanta (Scrumhalf), Brian Frantz (Prop), Ray Green (Center), Max Gutierrez (Fullback), Eric Harmon (Fullback), Kevin Hatcher (Lock), Jonah Holmes (Lock), Ben Juricek (Prop), Paul Kelly (Wing), Brian Kraybill (Lock), Marc Launey (Flanker), Pete Morales (Flanker), Joe Motes (Flyhalf), Jason Perry (Hooker), Shap Roder (Flanker), Eric Roof (Center), James Shaughnessy (Scrumhalf), David Stroble (Wing), Katsukito Takei (Flyhalf), Simon Terry–Lloyd (Flanker), Kester Wise (Flyhalf).

== Bracket ==
Regional Semifinal
December 3 - Orlando, FL
George Mason	10
Army	23
December 3 - Orlando, FL
Navy	33
Alabama	3
April 15 - Albuquerque, NM
Air Force	30
Colorado State	0
April 15 - Albuquerque, NM
NE Missouri State	15
New Mexico Highlands	10
November 5 - Bowling Green, OH
Miami (OH)	30
Southern Indiana	14
November 5 - Bowling Green, OH
Penn State	22
Notre Dame	18
April 22 - San Diego, CA
UC Berkeley	26
UC Davis	0
April 22 - San Diego, CA
Stanford	33
UC Santa Barbara	5

Regional Final
December 4 - Orlando, FL
Army	27
Navy	20
April 16 - Houston, TX
Air Force	20
NE Missouri State	12
November 6 - Bowling Green, OH
Penn State	43
Miami (OH)	14
April 23 - San Diego, CA
UC Berkeley	17
Stanford	13

National Semifinal
May 6 – Berkeley, CA
Army (East)	18
Air Force (West)	19
May 6 – Berkeley, CA
Penn State (Midwest)	12
UC Berkeley (Pacific)	41

National Final
May 7 – Berkeley, CA
Air Force	16
UC Berkeley	48
Third place
May 7 – Berkeley, CA
Army	23
Penn State	28

== Semifinals ==
6 May 1995
11:00AM

Army	18–19	Air Force
Try: Brian Perez 64'; Nathan Reel 80' c Con: Jason Jefferies; Pen: Jason Jefferies 18', 28'		Try: Chad Belettie 44'; Vernon Fletcher 56' c, 58' c Con: Jim Lamar

Berkeley, CA
Referee: Bob Loftus (USA)

6 May 1995
1:00PM

Penn State	12–41	UC Berkeley
Pen: Wayne Whitko 3', 16', 23', 27'		Try: Ted Callagy 5'; David Stroble 10'; Ray Green 50'; Ovie Brume 59' c, 76' c Con: Kevin Dalzell; Pen: Kevin Dalzell 17', 29', 42', 64'

Berkeley, CA

== Third place ==
7 May 1995
11:00 AM

Army	23–28	Penn State

Berkeley, CA

== Final ==
7 May 1995
1:00PM

Air Force	16–48	UC Berkeley
Try: Jim Lamar; Scott Arbogast; Pen: Jim Lamar; Alan Hook		Try: David Stroble (2), Jeff Arreguy c, Ovie Brume; Jonah Cave; Eric Roof; Kester Wise; Con: Kevin Dalzell; Pen: Kevin Dalzell (3)

Berkeley, CA
Attendance: 2100

== Women's College Championship ==
The 1995 Women's Collegiate Championship took place at West Windsor Field in Princeton, New Jersey from May 7–8. Princeton University qualified by winning the East Coast Territorial championship. Penn State was the winner at the Midwest Territorial, Air Force qualified from the Western Regional. Stanford represented the Pacific Coast. Princeton was the champion of this fifth edition. Jen Sproull of Penn State was named MVP Forward of the tournament and Kim Henderson of Princeton was MVP Back.

=== Semifinals ===
6 May 1995
11:00AM

Air Force	5–29	Princeton
Try: Lora Barr		Try: Erin Kennedy; Kristine Leporati

Princeton, NJ

6 May 1995
1:00PM

Penn State	17–0	Stanford
Try: Jen Sproull; Kathryn Grebos; Stacy Boyle; Con: 1

Princeton, NJ

=== Third place ===
7 May 1995
10:00AM

Air Force	15–12	Stanford

Princeton, NJ

=== Final ===
7 May 1995
1:00PM

Princeton	20–0	Penn State
Try: Kim Henderson 1H', 65', 2H' c Con: Susie Welgos; Pen: Susie Welgos 55'

Princeton, NJ
Referee: Pete Hesler

Champions: Princeton Tigers
Staff: Alex Curtis (Coach)
Captains: Tracy Smith, Yvonne Spencer
Roster: Andrea Kerman, Nicole Raney, Melissa Davidson, Stacey Georgilas, Tracy Hubbard, Joyce Gange, Heidi Wahlman, Patty Rodriguez–Rey, Virginia Weldon, Rashelle Brown, Carol Forner, Kandace Henry, Megan Monaghan, Cindy Green, Kerry Ellis, Melissa Baumann, Jennifer Hammerstead, Mary Hartman, April Drew, Elizabeth Templeton.

== College All–Stars ==
The 1995 National Collegiate All–Star Championship took place at Annapolis, MD from June 9–10. Similar to the All–Star Tournaments for club teams, the college competition is divided into geographic unions and used to select the All–American team that goes on to play other junior national rugby teams. The Pacific Coast All–Stars won an overtime victory over the East collegians 28–22.

Semifinals

9 June 1995

East	32–20	Midwest

Annapolis, MD

9 June 1995

Pacific Coast	56–15	West

Annapolis, MD

Consolation

10 June 1995

Midwest	50–5	West

Annapolis, MD
Referee: Ed Sorensen (Potomac)

Final

10 June 1995

Pacific	28–22	East
Try: Mike Ortiz 1H'; Mike Ortiz OT' c Bobby Blunt c Con: Bobby Blunt; Pen: Bobby Blunt (3)		Try: Pablo Perez; Todd Bruemer; Pen: Todd Bruemer (3); Drop: Todd Breumer

Annapolis, MD
Referee: David Kimber (Potomac)

Champions: Pacific Coast College All–Stars
Staff: Humm (Coach), Goldich (Trainer)
Roster: Bobby Blunt–Fullback/Wing (Stanford), Brian Brennan–Prop (Stanford), Ovie Brume–Wing (UC Berkeley), Jonah Cave-Flanker/#8 (UC Berkeley), Joe Clayton-#8 (Stanford), Ben Dewees–Flyhalf (UC Santa Cruz), Jeff Freund–Hooker (Stanford), Larry Huber–Lock/#8 (UC Davis), Brian Hudspeth-Hooker (San Diego State), Ben Juricek–Prop (UC Berkeley), Mark Launey-Flanker (UC Berkeley), Scott Lopker–Center/Flyhalf (UC Davis), Dave McDonald-Wing (UC Santa Barbara), Trung Ngo–Flanker (Stanford), Mike Ortiz–Center (UC Davis), Jazon Perez–Scrumhalf (UC Davis), Aaron Pingel-Scrumhalf (U. San Diego), Chris Rohrbach–Fullback (CSU Long Beach), Jeff Siemon–Lock (Stanford), Adam Smith–Lock (Stanford), Eric Stacy–Center (Washington), Rich Terry-Lloyd-Flanker (UC Davis), William Thompson–Scrumhalf (U. San Diego), Scott Yungling–Lock (San Diego State).

== See also ==
- 1995 National Rugby Championships
