= 1979 National Rugby Championships =

Tournament details
- Tournament format(s): Various
- Date: 1979

Tournament statistics

Final

The 1979 National Rugby Championships were a series of tournaments organized to determine a national champion in several divisions for United States rugby teams. The divisions included College, Military, Sevens, Interterritorial, and Men's/Women's Club.

== Men's Club ==
The 1979 National Club Rugby Championship was sponsored by Michelob and took place at Avila College in Kansas City, Missouri on May 12 and 13. The teams featured in the tournament were the champions of the four sub unions of USARFU. The Berkeley Old Blues won the title defeating St. Louis in the final after beating their New York namesakes in two overtime periods in the semifinal.

Territorial Semifinal
April 28 - San Francisco, CA
Old Blues	19
Old Puget Sound	4
April 28 - San Francisco, CA
BATS	20
Los Angeles	15
April 29 - Washington, D.C.
Old Blue	21
Norfolk City Blues	9
April 29 - Washington, D.C.
Baton Rouge	15
Whitemarsh	6
April 21 – St. Louis, MO
St. Louis Falcons	16
Oklahoma U.	13
April 22 – Albuquerque, NM
Albuquerque Aardvarks	25
Houston Heathens	12
May 6 - Dayton, OH
Akron	3
Minneapolis	0
May 6 - Dayton, OH
Chicago Lions	20
Pittsburgh	3

Territorial Final
April 29 – San Francisco, CA
Old Blues	6
BATS	3
April 29 – Washington, D.C.
Old Blue	24
Baton Rouge	0
April 28 – Denver, CO
St. Louis Falcons	6
Albuquerque Aardvarks	3
May 6 – Dayton, OH
Akron	17
Chicago Lions	13

National Semifinal
May 12 – Kansas City, MO
Old Blues (CA)	7
Old Blue (NY)	3
May 12 – Kansas City, MO
St. Louis Falcons	21
Akron (OH)	14

National Final
May 13 – Kansas City, MO
Old Blues (CA)	18
St. Louis Falcons	6
Third place
May 13 – Kansas City, MO
Old Blue (NY)	22
Akron (OH)	9

=== Semifinals ===
12 May 1979

St. Louis	21–14	Akron
Try: Tom McDonough 10' c Don Brown c Con: Bob Cronin; Pen: Bob Cronin (3)		Try: Steve Allensworth; Rick Underman c Terry Whelan; Con: Dave Forman

Kansas City, MO

12 May 1979

Old Blues (CA)	7–3 (OT)	Old Blue (NY)
Try: Art Ward 97'; Pen: John Dixon 19'		Pen: Malcolm Kimble 43'

Kansas City, MO
Attendance: 1000

=== Third place ===
13 May 1979

Old Blue (NY)	22–9	Akron
Try: Chimere Okezie c Joe Whalen c Chimere Okezie; Con: Malcolm Kimble; Pen: Malcolm Kimble 2		Try: Hill c Con: Dave Forman; Pen: Dave Forman

Kansas City, MO

=== Final ===
13 May 1979

Old Blues (CA)	18–6	St. Louis Falcons
Try: Blane Warhurst; Rick Bailey; Steve Grisch; Pen: John Dixon; Drop: 42' Bill Armstrong		Try: 18' Buster DelaRoche c Con: Bob Cronin

Kansas City, MO
Attendance: 1400
Referee: Peter Jones (ERU)

Champions: Old Blues RFC of Berkeley, CA
Coach: Ron Mayes
Roster: Bill Armstrong (Center), Rick Bailey (Prop), David Bateman (Scrumhalf), Jim Brazil (Prop), Peter Burman (Flyhalf), Jack Clark (Lock), John Dixon (Center), Leo Fracess (Prop), Pete Gunderson (Hooker), Stephen Gritsch (Wing), Chuck Hextrum (Lock), Dallas Hickman (Flanker), Mark Hoffman (Lock), Jeff Hollings (Hooker), Tom Philp (Wing), Steve Ponder (#8), Scott Stringer (Center), Mark Villa (Flyhalf), Art Ward (#8), Dennis Ward (Fullback), Blane Warhurst (Flanker/Wing).

== Women's Club ==
The 1979 Women's National Rugby Classic took place on September 1–2 at Lutheran Home Fields in Arlington Heights, IL. The tournament was co-sponsored by the Chicago Women's Rugby Football Club and Michelob beer. The format was two round-robin groups with group winners playing for the championship. The team from Florida State won the championship with four victories. The Heathen Hearts of Houston took third place by defeating holders, Portland.

Standings											
Rank	Team	Pld	W	L	F	A	FSU	POR	HOY	CHI	DEN
1.	Florida State	3	3	0	20	7	X	4:3	8:4	X	8:0
2.	Portland (ME)	3	2	1	17	4	3:4	X	X	10:0	4:0
3.	Hoyden Park (GA)	2	1	1	8	8	4:8	X	X	4:0	X
4.	Chicago	3	1	2	4	14	X	0:10	0:4	X	4:0
5.	Denver Blues	3	0	3	0	16	0:8	0:4	X	0:4	X

Standings										
Rank	Team	Pld	W	L	F	A	MAD	HEA	BOS	COL
1.	Madison (WI)	3	3	0	20	7	X	10:4	6:3	4:0
2.	Heathen Hearts (TX)	3	2	1	10	10	4:10	X	6:0	W:L
3.	Boston	3	1	2	19	16	3:6	0:6	X	16:4
4.	Colorado State	3	0	3	4	20	0:4	L:W	4:16	X

Ninth Place: Denver.
Seventh Place: Chicago 4-0 Colorado State
Fifth Place: Hoyden Park 16-4 Boston
Third Place: Houston def. Portland

=== Final ===
2 September 1979

Florida State	6–0	Madison
Try: Candy Orsini 55' c Con: Renata Brady

Arlington Heights, IL

== College ==
The 1979 College championship was won by Palmer College of Chiropractic. Navy finished fourth.

== Military ==
The 1979 Military Cup Rugby Championship was held May 5-6 on Stilwell Field at Fort Campbell.

Standings											
Rank	Team	Pld	W	L	F	A	FTC	SAV	FBO	FBF	FTP
1.	Ft Campbell All Blacks	3	3	0	51	6	X	30:0	13:6	8:0	X
2.	Savannah Rangers	4	2	2	41	64	0:30	X	10:17	11:7	20:10
3.	Ft Benning Old Boys	3	2	1	43	23	6:13	17:10	X	X	10:0
4.	Ft. Benning Flyers	3	1	2	11	19	0:8	7:11	X	X	4:0
5.	Fort Polk	3	0	3	0	18	X	0:4	0:10	0:4	X

== Sevens ==
The 1979 National Sevens Rugby Tournament was hosted by the Hartford Wanderers and took place on June 23, 1979, at Sterling Field in West Hartford, Connecticut. The twelve team tournament was won by the Denver Barbarians.

Semifinals
June 23 - Hartford, CT
Denver Barbarians	24
Scioto Valley (OH)	6
June 23 - Hartford, CT
University of Rhode Island	11
Hartford Wanderers	7

Final
June 23 - Hartford, CT
Denver Barbarians	12
University of Rhode Island	10

== ITT ==
The Inter Territorial Tournament involved the four regional rugby unions comprising the United States RFU: Pacific Coast RFU, Western RFU, Midwest RFU, and the Eastern Rugby Union. The region teams are formed from selected players from the sub regional rugby unions. Subsequently, the USA Eagles are selected from the four regional teams after the ITT concludes. The 1979 edition was held on the polo fields of the International Sports Core in Oakbrook, IL. won by the Pacific Coast RFU. Pacific Coast's Mike Fanucchi and Jack Clark were most valuable back and most valuable forward respectively.
Results:

26 May 1979
2:00PM

Eastern	0–21	Pacific Coast
		Try: Del Chipman; Rick Bailey c Jerry Kelleher; Del Chipman; Con: Dennis Jablonski; Pen: Dennis Jablonski

Oakbrook, IL

26 May 1979
3:00PM

Midwest	28–18	Western
Try: Doug Mosser; Gary Larsen c Gary Larsen c Terry Rauen c Con: Rod Correia; Pen: Rod Correia; Drop: Rod Correia		Try: Bob Arnold c Riche Parker c Con: Dave Wilson; Pen: Dave Wilson (2)

Oakbrook, IL

27 May 1979
2:00PM

Pacific Coast	21–3	Western
Try: 14' Steve Grey c Steve Grey c Con: Thomas Smith; Pen: 19' Thomas Smith; 1H' Thomas Smith; 41' Thomas Smith		Drop: Milt Bennett

Oakbrook, IL

27 May 1979
3:00PM

Midwest	31–11	Eastern
Try: Gary Larsen; Dick Cooke c Duncan Hales; Con: Rod Correia; Pen: Dick Cooke (4); Rod Correia; Drop: Dick Cooke		Try: Scheitlin; Chimere Okezie; Pen: Dan Collins

Oakbrook, IL

28 May 1979
11:00AM

Eastern	34–3	Western
Try: Tim Moser c Mike Liscovitz c Tim Moser c Gary Bancroft; Con: Gary Bancroft; Pen: Gary Bancroft (2); Drop: Gary Bancroft (2)		Pen: Doug Park

Oakbrook, IL
Attendance: 1000

28 May 1979
1:00PM

Midwest	9–22	Pacific Coast
Try: Duncan Hales c Con: Rod Correia; Pen: ?		Try: Jeff Lombard; Mike Fanucchi c Mike Fanucchi c Con: Dennis Jablonski; Pen: 22' Dennis Jablonski ?

Oakbrook, IL

Team		W	L	F	A
1	Pacific Coast Grizzlies	3	0	64	12
2	Midwest Thunderbirds	2	1	68	51
3	Eastern Colonials	1	2	45	55
4	Western Mustangs	0	3	24	83

Champions: Pacific Coast Grizzlies
Coach: Ron Mayes
Captain: Jeff Hollings-Hooker (Old Blues)
Roster: Rick Bailey-Prop (Old Blues), David Briley-Prop (Santa Monica), Mickey Ording-Prop (X–O RC), Jay Hansen-Hooker (San Francisco), Jack Clark-Lock (Old Blues), Chuck Hextrum-Lock (Old Blues), Brad Andrews-#8 (Santa Monica), Art Ward-#8 (Old Blues), Jeffrey Lombard-Flanker (Chuckanut Bay), David Morrison-Flanker (Santa Monica), Skip Niebauer-Flanker (BATS), Dave Bateman-Scrumhalf (Old Blues), Bob McFayden-Scrumhalf (OMBAC), Steve Gray-Flyhalf (Los Angeles), Thomas Smith-Flyhalf (Santa Monica), Tom O'Grady-Center (BATS), Michael Fanucchi-Center (BATS), Boyd Morrison-Center (Los Angeles), Del Chipman-Wing (UCLA), Lin Walton-Wing (OMBAC), Mike Purcell-Wing (BATS), Ian Gunn-Fullback (Old Puget Sound), Dennis Jablonski-Fullback (Santa Monica).
