= 1973 National Rugby Championships =

Tournament details
- Tournament format(s): Knockout
- Date: 1973

Tournament statistics

Final

The 1973 National Rugby Championships included the Collegiate tournament and the 15th edition of the Monterey National.

== College ==
The 1973 National Collegiate Rugby championship took place from May 5–6 at the Mississippi Valley Fairgrounds in Davenport, Iowa. Palmer College of Chiropractic were the champions. Illinois was runner-up.
Results:

Championship Bracket

First round
May 5 - Davenport, IA
Palmer	20
Wisconsin	4
May 5 - Davenport, IA
St. Ambrose	w/o
New Hampshire
May 5 - Davenport, IA
Washington & Lee
Illinois State	w/o
May 5 - Davenport, IA
Yale
Iowa State	w/o
May 5 - Davenport, IA
Illinois	7
Florida State	0
May 5 - Davenport, IA
Michigan State	6
South Carolina	9
May 5 - Davenport, IA
Central Methodist	21
Notre Dame	12
May 5 - Davenport, IA
Creighton
Michigan	w/o

Quarterfinal
May 5 - Davenport, IA
Palmer	22
St. Ambrose	0
May 5 - Davenport, IA
Illinois State	21
Iowa State	10
May 5 - Davenport, IA
Illinois	12
South Carolina	7
May 5 - Davenport, IA
Central Methodist	29
Michigan	4

Semifinal
May 6 - Davenport, IA
Palmer	W
Illinois State	L
May 6 - Davenport, IA
Illinois	12
Central Methodist	3

Final
May 6 - Davenport, IA
Palmer	13
Illinois	4
Third place
May 6 - Davenport, IA
Illinois State	4
Central Methodist	12

=== Final ===
6 May 1973
3:00PM

Palmer	13–4	Illinois
Try: Rob Taylor; Pen: Mike Lynch (2); Art Durham		Try: 1

Davenport, IA
Attendance: 4800

Champions: Palmer College of Chiropractic
Coach: Peter Flett
Captain: Brian Adam

== Monterey National Championship ==
Program cover for 1973 tournament.

The 1973 Monterey National Rugby Championship was the 15th edition of the tournament and was considered to be the de facto national championship. This event took place at Pebble Beach, CA from March 24–25. The Hastings Outstanding player award went to Jerry Walters of Santa Monica. Jerry Walters also won the Drop Kick competition with Chris Hyrne of Santa Clara coming in second. The Santa Monica Rugby Club went 5–0 to take first place.

First round

24 March 1973 1	Santa Monica RC	3-0	St. Mary's College	Pebble Beach
7:00AM				Stadium: Field 1

24 March 1973 2	Pensacola Navy	0-3	Sacramento Capitol	Pebble Beach
7:00AM				Stadium: Field 2

24 March 1973 3	CSU Los Angeles	0-0 (W–L p)	U. of Oregon	Pebble Beach
7:00AM				Stadium: Field 3

24 March 1973 4	USC	6-3	Stanford University	Pebble Beach
7:00AM				Stadium: Field 4

24 March 1973 5	Los Angeles RC	3-0	San Jose St	Pebble Beach
7:30AM				Stadium: Field 1

24 March 1973 6	Portland	0-6	X–O RC	Pebble Beach
7:30AM				Stadium: Field 2

24 March 1973 7	UC Davis	16-6	Occidental College	Pebble Beach
7:30AM				Stadium: Field 3

24 March 1973 8	Santa Clara U.	6-17	Old Puget Sound Beach	Pebble Beach
7:30AM				Stadium: Field 4

24 March 1973 9	UC Berkeley	7-0	U. of Washington	Pebble Beach
8:00AM				Stadium: Field 1

24 March 1973 10	Monterey RC	4-6	OMBAC	Pebble Beach
8:00AM				Stadium: Field 2

24 March 1973 11	Irvine Coast	4-0	North Counties	Pebble Beach
8:00AM				Stadium: Field 3

24 March 1973 12	Washington State	3-22	Peninsula Ramblers	Pebble Beach
8:00AM				Stadium: Field 4

24 March 1973 13	UC Santa Barbara	7-3	Seahawk RC	Pebble Beach
8:30AM				Stadium: Field 1

24 March 1973 14	Olde Gaels	0-0 (L–W p)	Western Washington	Pebble Beach
8:30AM				Stadium: Field 2

24 March 1973 15	Finlander RC	0-0 (L–W p)	San Francisco RC	Pebble Beach
8:30AM				Stadium: Field 3

24 March 1973 16	Cal Poly	0-0 (L–W p)	BATS	Pebble Beach
8:30AM				Stadium: Field 4

Championship Bracket

Second Round; March 24
1	Santa Monica	20
Sacramento	4
CSU LA	10
USC	6
Los Angeles	9
X–O	15
UC Davis	9
4	Old Puget Sound	4
2	UC Berkeley	16
OMBAC	4
Irvine Coast	0
Ramblers	14
UC Santa Barbara	4
Western Washington	3
San Francisco	3
3	BATS	13

Quarterfinals; March 24
1	Santa Monica	16
CSU LA	6
X–O	6
UC Davis	3
2	UC Berkeley	15
Ramblers	4
Santa Barbara	6
3	BATS	7

Semifinals; March 24
1	Santa Monica	6
X–O	3
2	UC Berkeley	16
3	BATS	0

Final; March 25
1	Santa Monica	11
2	UC Berkeley	9
Third place
X–O	9
3	BATS	6

=== Third place ===
25 March 1973
12:45PM

X–O RC	9–6	BATS
Try: John Deschler c Con: Ording; Pen: Ording		Pen: O'Donohue (2)

Collins Polo Field

=== Final ===
25 March 1973
2:20PM

Santa Monica	11–9	UC Berkeley
Try: Gordon Bosserman 28'; Fred Khasigian 55'; Pen: Bobby Thrussell		Try: Steve Finau 15' c Con: Terry Buchanan; Pen: Terry Buchanan 70'

Collins Polo Field

Champions: Santa Monica Rugby Club
Coach: Ron Nisbet
Captain: Dave Stephenson
Roster: Brad Andrews, Gordon Bosserman, Tim Desmond, Frank DiGennaro, Bill Eakland, Mike Fenerin, Russ Goodman, Fred Khasigian, Vic Lepisto, Tom Mahoney, Gordon Moir, Rag Moore, Dennis Murphy, Ed O'Conner, Mark Olsen, Larry Petrill, Greg Schneeweis, Kent Stevens, Dean Sweeney, Craig Sweeney, Robert Thrussel, Jerry Walter.

5th–8th
L33	CSU LA	3*
L37	UC Davis	3
L41	Ramblers	10
L42	Santa Barbara	6

Fifth place
W50	CSU LA	3
W54	Ramblers	24
Seventh place
L50	UC Davis	10
L54	Santa Barbara	0

*Advanced on kicks

Thirteenth
Field 2 10:15AM
W46	USC	10
W56	Irvine	0
Fifteenth
Field 3 12:45PM
L46	Los Angeles	0
L56	San Francisco	10

13th–16th
Field 2 2:50PM
L34	USC	22
L35	Los Angeles	0
Field 4 4:30PM
L39	Irvine	8
L43	San Francisco	0

9th–16th
Field 2 12:20PM
L17	Sacramento	10
L18	USC	0
Field 3 12:20PM
L21	Los Angeles	3
L22	Old Puget	10
Field 3 1:10PM
L25	OMBAC	7
L26	Irvine	0
Field 3 2:00PM
L29	West. Washington	8
L30	San Francisco	0

9th–12th
Field 1 2:50PM
W34	Sacramento	17
W35	Old Puget	3
Field 3 4:30PM
W39	OMBAC	0
W43	West. Wash.	6

Ninth
Field 2 12:45PM
W45	Old Puget	18
W55	W. Wash.	18
Eleventh
Field 2 11:30AM
L45	Sacramento	12
L55	OMBAC	13
