= 1974 National Rugby Championships =

Tournament details
- Tournament format(s): Knockout
- Date: 1974

Tournament statistics

Final

The 1974 National Rugby Championships included the Collegiate tournament and the 16th edition of the Monterey National.

== College ==
The 1974 College championship was a 16 team tournament that took place from February 23–24 at LSU's Parade Grounds in Baton Rouge, Louisiana. Texas A&M were the champions. LSU was runner-up. Texas A&M won four matches in the series to win the title. Florida State took third place as well as the Sportsmanship Trophy.
Results:

Championship Bracket

First round
February 23 - Baton Rouge, LA
LSU	18
Notre Dame	14
February 23 - Baton Rouge, LA
Illinois	W
L
February 23 - Baton Rouge, LA
Ohio State	12
Central Methodist	7
February 23 - Baton Rouge, LA
Boston College	23
WV Wesleyan	4
February 23 - Baton Rouge, LA
Texas A&M	32
Georgetown	0
February 23 - Baton Rouge, LA
NC State
Holy Cross
February 23 - Baton Rouge, LA
Florida State	11
Indiana	3
February 23 - Baton Rouge, LA
Colorado State	4
Palmer Chiropractic	3

Quarterfinal
February 23 - Baton Rouge, LA
LSU	W
Illinois	L
February 23 - Baton Rouge, LA
Ohio State	14
Boston College	0
February 23 - Baton Rouge, LA
Texas A&M	26
NC State	3
February 23 - Baton Rouge, LA
Florida State	13
Colorado State	0

Semifinal
February 24 - Baton Rouge, LA
LSU	4*
Ohio State	4
February 24 - Baton Rouge, LA
Texas A&M	7*
Florida State	7

Final
February 24 - Baton Rouge, LA
LSU	0
Texas A&M	12
Third place
February 24 - Baton Rouge, LA
Ohio State	0
Florida State	18

* Won by tie breaker kickoff

Consolation Bracket
First round losers

Quarter-finals
February 23 - Baton Rouge, LA
Notre Dame	W
L
February 23 - Baton Rouge, LA
Central Methodist	16
WV Wesleyan	0
February 23 - Baton Rouge, LA
Georgetown	w/o
Holy Cross
February 23 - Baton Rouge, LA
Indiana	13
Palmer	16

Semi-finals
February 24 - Baton Rouge, LA
Notre Dame
Central Methodist	L
February 24 - Baton Rouge, LA
Georgetown	6
Palmer	34

Final
February 24 - Baton Rouge, LA
Notre Dame	4
Palmer	14
Third place
February 24 - Baton Rouge, LA
WV Wesleyan	3
Georgetown	22

Second round losers

Semi-finals
February 24 – Baton Rouge, LA
Illinois	12
Boston College	7
February 24 – Baton Rouge, LA
NC State	20
Colorado State	9

Final
Third place

=== Final ===
24 February 1974
3:00PM

Texas A&M	12–0	LSU
Try: Aaron Cahoon; Dave Eslinger; Bruce Mills

Parade Ground, Baton Rouge

Champions: Texas A&M
Coaches: John Gunn, Lee Roberts
Roster: Gene Sunny (Left Prop), George Alden (Hooker), Louis Gorilla (Right Prop), Jim Goulding (2nd Row Forward), Bobby Way (2nd Row Forward), Ken Buchek (8th Man), Aaron Cahoon-captain (Scrumhalf), Hillard Simmons (Flyhalf), Carey Whitehead (Inside Center), Joel Stockton (Outside Center), Steve Beckendam (Left Wing), Randy Harju (Right Wing), Bruce Mills (Fullback).

== Monterey National Championship ==
The 1974 Monterey National Rugby Championship was the 16th edition of the tournament and was considered to be the de facto national championship. This event took place at Pebble Beach, CA from March 22–23. The tournament MVP was John Hipwell of NSWC. Mr. Rugby was 84 year old Watson Luke. 16 year players were Walt Gomez of Peninsula Ramblers and Murdo Nicholson of Olde Gaels. Bill Armstrong of Old Blues won the Drop Kick contest while Bruce Barry of Air Force was runner-up. New South Wales Country went 5–0 to take first place.

First round

22 March 1974 1	Santa Monica RC	20-3	Monterey RC	Pebble Beach
8:00AM				Stadium: Field 1

22 March 1974 2	Portland RC	0-6	Old Blues RC	Pebble Beach
8:00AM				Stadium: Field 2

22 March 1974 3	CSU Long Beach	6-0	St. Mary's College	Pebble Beach
8:00AM				Stadium: Field 3

22 March 1974 4	U. of Montana	0-6	Stanford University	Pebble Beach
8:00AM				Stadium: Field 4

22 March 1974 5	Texas A&M	0-0 (W–L p)	Western Washington St	Pebble Beach
8:30AM				Stadium: Field 1

22 March 1974 6	San Jose State	3-0	Los Angeles RC	Pebble Beach
8:30AM				Stadium: Field 2

22 March 1974 7	Chuckanut Bay RC	3-0	North Counties	Pebble Beach
8:30AM				Stadium: Field 3

22 March 1974 8	OMBAC	0-3	BATS	Pebble Beach
8:30AM				Stadium: Field 4

22 March 1974 9	NSW Country	20-0	Air Force Academy	Pebble Beach
9:00AM				Stadium: Field 1

22 March 1974 10	Oregon State	0-9	Olde Gaels RC	Pebble Beach
9:00AM				Stadium: Field 2

22 March 1974 11	UC Davis	6-7	USC	Pebble Beach
9:00AM				Stadium: Field 3

22 March 1974 12	Peninsula Ramblers	7-6	San Luis Obispo RC	Pebble Beach
9:00AM				Stadium: Field 4

22 March 1974 13	Old Puget Sound Beach	4-0	Sacramento Capitol RC	Pebble Beach
9:30AM				Stadium: Field 1

22 March 1974 14	UC Santa Barbara	0-0 (L–W p)	X–O RC	Pebble Beach
9:30AM				Stadium: Field 2

22 March 1974 15	Houston RC	3-9	San Francisco RC	Pebble Beach
9:30AM				Stadium: Field 3

22 March 1974 16	Finlander RC	0-15	UC Berkeley	Pebble Beach
9:30AM				Stadium: Field 4

Championship Bracket

Second Round; March 22
1	Santa Monica	13
Old Blues	0
CSU Long Beach	6
Stanford	10
Texas A&M	0
San Jose St	21
Chuckanut Bay	3
3	BATS	12
2	NSWC	18
Olde Gaels	0
USC	18
Peninsula Ramblers	3
Old Puget Sound Beach	3
X–O	15
San Francisco	0
4	UC Berkeley	16

Quarterfinals; March 22
1	Santa Monica	12
Stanford	0
San Jose St	3
3	BATS	6
2	NSWC	24
USC	0
X–O	0
4	UC Berkeley	9

Semifinals; March 22
1	Santa Monica	11
3	BATS	9
2	NSWC	6
4	UC Berkeley	3

Final; March 23
1	Santa Monica	6
2	NSWC	36
Third place
3	BATS	0
4	UC Berkeley	45

=== Final ===
23 March 1974
2:20PM

Santa Monica	6–36	NSWC
Pen: Bobby Thrussell 20'; Bobby Thrussell 39'		Try: John Hipwell 18' c Bill McKidd; James Hindmarsh; Weatherstone; Cornelson; Kim Thurbon; Mendham; Brown; Con: Robert Wilkinson (2)

Pebble Beach

Champions: New South Wales
Manager: Ross Turnbull
Coach: Daryl Harberecht
Roster: John Barron, Robert Brown, Gregory Cornelsen, Glenn Eisenhauer, Warwick Fletcher, Anthony Gelling, Garrett Grey, Lars Hedberg, James Hindmarsh, John Hipwell, Peter Horton, John Lambie, William Lloyd–Green, Stuart MacDougall, William Mendham, Brian McIntyre, William McKidd, Brian Mansfield, Charles Onus, Peter Payten, Peter Prince, Timothy Rowlands, Kim Thurbon, Laurence Weatherstone, Robert Wilkinson.

5th–8th
L33	Stanford	6
L37	San Jose St	0
L41	USC	9
L42	X–O	3

Fifth place
W50	Stanford	12
W54	USC	3
Seventh place
L50	San Jose St	12
L54	X–O	9

Thirteenth
Field 2 10:15AM
W46	Long Beach	10
W56	San Francisco	0
Fifteenth
Field 3 12:45PM
L46	Chuckanut Bay	3
L56	Ramblers	24

13th–16th
Field 2 3:50PM
L34	Long Beach	20
L35	Chuckanut Bay	3
Field 4 5:30PM
L39	Ramblers	3
L43	San Francisco	6

9th–16th
Field 2 1:20PM
L17	Old Blues	4*
L18	Long Beach	4
Field 3 1:20PM
L21	Texas A&M	6
L22	Chuckanut Bay	3
Field 3 2:10PM
L25	Olde Gaels	4
L26	Ramblers	0
Field 3 3:00PM
L29	OPSB	3*
L30	San Francisco	3

9th–12th
Field 1 3:50PM
W34	Old Blues	17
W35	Texas A&M	3
Field 3 5:30PM
W39	Olde Gaels	6
W43	OPSB	10

Ninth
Field 2 12:45PM
W45	Old Blues	6
W55	OPSB	0
Eleventh
Field 2 11:30AM
L45	Texas A&M	24
L55	Olde Gaels	3

*Advanced on kicks
