= 1993 National Collegiate Rugby Championship =

Tournament details
- Tournament format(s): Knockout
- Date: May 1 – 2, 1993

Tournament statistics
- Teams: 4
- Matches played: 4

Final
- Venue: Houston, TX
- Champions: UC Berkeley (10th title)
- Runners-up: Air Force

The 1993 National Collegiate Rugby Championship was the fourteenth edition of the official national championship for intercollegiate rugby. Both the Men's and Women's tournaments took place at Rice University in Houston, TX from May 1–2. UC Berkeley won their tenth title with a victory over Air Force. UC Berkeley scrum half Andre Bachelet was named MVP of the tournament.

== Venue ==
Texas
Rice University	1993 National Collegiate Rugby Championship is located in Texas
Houston, Texas	1993 National Collegiate Rugby Championship is located in Texas
Capacity:	1993 National Collegiate Rugby Championship is located in Texas

== Participants ==
Harvard

Qualified for the National Championship by advancing from the Eastern College Championship on December 5–6 at Memorial Stadium in Columbia, SC.

- Harvard 55-8 LSU
- Harvard 19-6 Navy

Record- 11–1
Coach- Al Baker
Captain- John Hoffman
Roster:
Peccei, Geary, Eric Biland, Jim Kauffman, Frickel, Monte Geise, Stephens, Kiki Ssenyamantono, Gordon, Mark Puckett, Rob Santos, Howard, Jason Luzak, Andrew Pinkerton, Marks, Siever, Julio DePietro, Andrew Preware, Parmet, Kozek, Froeschel.

Wisconsin

Qualified for the National Championship by winning the Midwest Universities Cup on November 7–8 in Bowling Green, OH.

- Wisconsin 20–12 Notre Dame
- Wisconsin 42-0 Purdue

Record- 15–2
Coach- Stu Pippel
Captain- Jim Thill
Roster:
Wahlstrom, Curtin, Seidl, Doersch, Koehler, Black, Daly, Henschel, Hickey, Reidy, McKelvey, Drugan, Imes, Sperling.

Air Force

Qualified for the National Championship by winning the Western Collegiate Championship on April 10–11 in Houston, TX.

- Air Force 69–5 New Mexico State
- Air Force 54-0 John Brown University
- Air Force 41-0 Kansas University

Colors– Blue/Silver
Record- 12–0
Coaches- Mike Cartney, David Oldfield, Danny Miller, Mark Knofczynski
Captains- Dave Adams, Casey Hackathorn
Roster:
Jay Marque, Trent Tuthill, Mike Traw, Matt Keiper, Rex Ballinger, Eric Bulger, Sean Cavan, Matt Benivegna, Chris Eden, Noah Hardie, Lance Teel, Bill Speros, Robert Harris, Berman.

UC Berkeley

Qualified from Pacific Coast College Championships on April 16–18 in Corvallis, OR.

- UC Berkeley 28-0 Oregon State
- UC Berkeley 33-0 University of Washington
- UC Berkeley 44-0 Cal Poly San Luis Obispo

Record- 18–2–1 (8–0)
Coaches- Jack Clark, Dan Porter, Rick Bailey, Higgins, Hanley (Trainer), Jerry Figone (Manager), Schram (Manager),
Captains-Ray Lehner (Prop), Andre Bachelet (Scrumhalf)
Roster:
Jeff Arreguy (Lock), John Ball (Center), Rowan Belchers (Flanker), Jim Bell (Center), Kelly Bellue (Prop), Robin Belle (Hooker), Ovie Brume (Wing), Chris Carrigg (Center), Jonah Cave (Flanker), Tom Chapman (Lock), Jeff Chenu (Flanker), Peter Codevilla (Lock), Kevin Dalzell (Scrumhalf), Brian Frantz (Prop), Ray Green (Center), Eric Harmon (Fullback), Derek Hitchcock (Flanker), Ben Juricek (Prop), Min Kim (Wing), Joe Motes (Flyhalf), Shap Roder (Lock), Scott Snyder (Hooker), Ray Lehner (Prop), Rob Swanbeck (Center), Rob Lumkong (Flanker), Josh Martin (Flanker), Ian Tong (Fullback), Scott Painter (Wing), Matt Palamountain (Wing), Kester Wise (Flyhalf).

== Bracket ==
Regional Semifinal
April 17 - Corvallis, OR
UC Berkeley	33
Washington	0
April 17 - Corvallis, OR
Cal Poly SLO	5
San Diego State	0
December 5 - Columbia, SC
Harvard	55
LSU	8
December 5 - Columbia, SC
Navy	27
Dartmouth	9
April 10 - Houston, TX
Air Force	54
John Brown	0
April 10 - Houston, TX
Rice University	8
Kansas University	11
November 8 - Bowling Green, OH
Wisconsin	20
Notre Dame	12
November 8 - Bowling Green, OH
Purdue	8
Cincinnati	5

Regional Final
April 18 - Corvallis, OR
UC Berkeley	44
Cal Poly SLO	0
December 6 - Columbia, SC
Harvard	19
Navy	6
April 11 - Houston, TX
Air Force	41
Kansas University	0
November 8 - Bowling Green, OH
Wisconsin	42
Purdue	0

National Semifinal
May 1 – Houston, TX
UC Berkeley (Pacific)	17
Harvard (East)	6
May 1 – Houston, TX
Air Force (West)	44
Wisconsin (Midwest)	10

National Final
May 2 – Houston, TX
UC Berkeley	36
Air Force	6
Third place
May 2 – Houston, TX
Harvard	44
Wisconsin	0

== Semifinals ==
1 May 1993
1:00PM

UC Berkeley	17–6	Harvard
Try: Ovie Brume 57' c Andre Bachelet 2H'; Con: Rob Swanbeck (2); Pen: Andre Bachelet 77'		Pen: Andrew Pinkerton 29', 60'

Houston, TX
Referee: Dave Head (USA)

1 May 1993
3:00PM

Air Force	44–10	Wisconsin
Try: Eric Bulger 13'; David Adams 30'; Lawrence Teel 38', 68'; Noah Hardie 58'; Mike Traw 62'; Con: Chris Eden (2); Pen: Chris Eden 57'		Try: 2H' c Con: (1); Pen: Brendan Daly

Houston, TX
Referee: Mark Binning (USA)

== Third place ==
2 May 1993
10:00 AM

Harvard	44–0	Wisconsin
Try: Eric Biland; Mark Puckett; John Hoffman; Andrew Preware; Julio DePietro (2); Siever; Rob Santos

Houston, TX
Referee: A. Owens (Texas)

== Final ==
2 May 1993
2:00PM

UC Berkeley	36–6	Air Force
Try: Matt Palamountain 4' c Rob Lumkong 47' c Eric Harmon 62' c Eric Harmon 75'; Con: Andre Bachelet (2); Pen: Rob Swanbeck 12', 30', 2H'; Andre Bachelet 78'		Pen: Chris Eden 8', 39'

Houston, TX
Referee: Mark Binning (USA)

== Women's College Championship ==
The 1993 Women's Collegiate Championship took place at the Rice University in Houston, TX from May 1–2. The University of Connecticut qualified by winning the East Coast Territorial championship. Penn State was the winner at the Midwest Territorial, Air Force represented the West and Stanford the Pacific Coast. University of Connecticut was the champion of this third edition. University of Connecticut center Kimberly Cyganik was named MVP of the tournament.

=== Semifinals ===
1 May 1993
9:00AM

Connecticut	47–0	Stanford
Try: Pam Vartelas 5' c, 47', 56'; Kim Cyganik 18'; Jennifer Michnowicz; Leslie Body; Jeanine Bertolini; Kristen Chudzik 42'; Daria Stasiuk 73'; Con: Kim Cyganik

Houston, TX
Referee: J. Turner (West)

1 May 1993
11:00AM

Air Force	34–0	Penn State
Try: Yvonne Spencer 4'; Virginia Weldon 39' c Hubbard 40+'; Natalie Wittman; Yvonne Spencer; Candace Henry; Con: Virginia Weldon (2)

Houston, TX
Referee: A. Owens (Texas)

=== Third place ===
2 May 1993
10:00AM

Penn State	7–0	Stanford
Try: Suzanne Hannon 32' c Con: Trisha Chipeleski

Houston, TX
Referee: J. Turner (West)

=== Final ===
2 May 1993
12:00PM

Connecticut	17–0	Air Force
Try: Kristen Chudzik 11' pushover 1H'; Kim Cyganik 80+' c Con: Kim Cyganik

Houston, TX
Referee: Dave Head (USA)

Lineups:
UConn– Zinser, Richards, Enrique, Wolff, Dolan, Cyganik (Captain), Mulliken, Michnowicz, Stasiuk, Body, Bertolini, Chudzik, Dougherty, Vartelas, Stutesman.
Air Force– Monaghan, Rodriguez–Ray, Weldon, Wittman, Brown, Forner, Henry, Green, Spencer, Barrett (Captain), Lorenzo–Luacas, Keskman, Lau, Hubbard, Smith.

Champions: University of Connecticut
Staff: Matt Miller (Coach), Tilki, Crimmins
Captain: Kimberly Cyganik (Center)
Roster: Beka Apostolidis (Flanker), Janine Bertolini (Flyhalf), Lesley Body (Scrumhalf), Kristen Chudzik (Wing), Cathy Dolan (Lock), Deb Dougherty (Center), Maureen Enrique (Prop), Jessica Hammond (Flyhalf), Sandra Martell (Lock), Jennifer Michnowicz (Flanker), Alyssa Mulliken (Flanker), Judith Paradis (Wing), Denise Quinn (#8), Bonny Richards (Hooker), Daria Stasiuk (#8), Nancy Stutesman (Fullback), Pam Vartelas (Wing), Wendy Walworth (Prop), Liz Wolff (Lock), Mary Lou Zinser (Prop).

== College All–Stars ==
The 1993 National Collegiate All–Star Championship took place at the University of Denver in Denver, CO from June 18–20. Similar to the All–Star Tournaments for club teams, the college competition is divided into geographic unions and used to select the All–American team that goes on to play other junior national rugby teams. In the final, the Pacific Coast RFU defeated the Eastern RU.

Semifinals

19 June 1993

Pacific Coast	48–29	Midwest

Denver, CO

19 June 1993

East	29–9	West

Denver, CO

Final

20 June 1993

Pacific Coast	21–19	East
Try: Matt Palamountain 40+'; Ian Tong 80+' c Con: Rob Swanbeck (1); Pen: Rob Swanbeck 10', 15', 70'		Try: Jason Hedberg 16' c Con: Dave Skinner; Pen: Dave Skinner 24', 30', 47', 65'

Denver, CO

Lineups:
Pacific Coast College All–Stars– Ortlieb, Bellue (Pierce), Lehner, Codevilla, Perez, Martin, Shepard, Chenu (Captain), Dalzell, Wise, Palamountain (Tong), Affleck, Scharrenberg (Swayback).
Eastern College All–Stars– Lewis, Young, Petracelli, Gawronski, Lacykowski, Dettling, Holtzman, Hedberg, Sica, Finney, Wright, Wright, Crisafalli, Terech, Skinner.

== See also ==
1993 National Rugby Championships
