= 1994 National Collegiate Rugby Championship =

Tournament details
- Tournament format(s): Knockout
- Date: May 7 – 8, 1994

Tournament statistics
- Teams: 4
- Matches played: 4

Final
- Venue: Washington, D.C.
- Champions: UC Berkeley (11th title)
- Runners-up: Navy

The 1994 National Collegiate Rugby Championship was the fifteenth edition of the official national championship for intercollegiate rugby. The Men's tournament took place at Catholic University of America in Washington, D.C. from May 7–8. UC Berkeley won their eleventh title with a victory over Navy. The final was televised on ESPN.

== Venue ==
Washington D.C.
DuFour Stadium	1994 National Collegiate Rugby Championship is located in the District of Columbia
Washington, D.C.	1994 National Collegiate Rugby Championship is located in the District of Columbia
Capacity: 3500	1994 National Collegiate Rugby Championship is located in the District of Columbia

== Participants ==
Navy

Qualified for the National Championship by advancing from the Eastern College Championship on December 4–5 at the WildeWood Polo fields in Columbia, SC.

- Navy 24-0 Army
- Navy 30-8 Connecticut

Record- 27–0
Coach- Mike Flanagan (Head Coach), Cassady, Visscher, Wilson, Long, Collins (Trainer)
Captain- Jason Hedberg (#8)
Roster:
Matthew Armas (Flyhalf), Lee Baird (Hooker), Barry Bassel (Center), Todd Bruemer (Fullback), Mike Bruneau (Flanker), Brian Campell (Wing), Dan Deciechi (Scrumhalf), Pete Dumont (Wing), Scott Gleason (#8), James Gilson (Wing), Josh Hall (Scrumhalf), Graham Hamill (Wing), Brad Hanner (Lock), Jeff Hoaglund (Lock), Bill Mallory (Center), Kurt Mole (Fullback), James Patterson (Flanker), Dave Pettersen (Hooker), Adam Piepkoen (Center), Bart Randall (Prop), William Rayburn (Prop), William Reed (Flyhalf), James Righter (Center), Eric Schuette (Flanker), Owen Voelker (Lock), Scott Young (Wing), Kyle Miller, Chris Hayle.

Penn State Nittany Lions

Qualified for the National Championship by winning the Midwest Universities Cup on November 6–7 in Bowling Green, OH.

- Penn State 27–12 Miami (OH)
- Penn State 38–16 Notre Dame
- Penn State 34-8 Wisconsin

Record- 15–
Coaches- Fraser Grigor, Terry Ryland
Captain- Ryan Nagle (Scrumhalf)
Roster:
Timothy Armagast (Flyhalf), Brian Anson (Wing), Brian Baker (Lock), Troy Bartley (Flanker), Greg Brandwene (Lock), Dan Brown (Wing), James Dailey (Hooker), Rob DeLuca (Flanker), Steve Dick (Prop), Ed Dressler (Prop), Mike Elgin (Wing), Sam Fallon (Center), Tim Finnerty (Flanker), Mike Feightner (#8), Frank Ike (Hooker), Bill King (Flyhalf), Jay Kolb (Prop), Jeff Lockhart (#8), Jeremy Madaras (Prop), Ed Mehlig (Center), Todd Metcalf (Lock), Jon Nichols (Flanker), Neil Phillips (#8), Matt O'Leary (Center), Jesse Schlegel (Center), Derek Sferro (Wing), Kurt Shuman (Wing), Bill Spencer (Scrumhalf), Jeff Thompson (Fullback), Brad West (Flanker).

Air Force

Qualified for the National Championship by winning the Western Collegiate Championship at Rice University from April 16–17 in Houston, TX.

- Air Force 23–7 New Mexico Highlands
- Air Force 30-0 Sam Houston State
- Air Force 43-12 NE Missouri State

Colors– Blue/Silver
Record- 15–1
Coaches- Floyd Finley, Chuck Milligan, Mike Junk
Captains- Chris Eden (Flyhalf), Michael S. Traw (Prop)
Roster:
V. Scott Arbogast (Outside Center), Rex Michael Bellinger (Lock), Gregory Bender (Hooker), T. Jay Bice (Wing), Kyle Edward Carpenter (Wing), John Chastain (Wing), Andrew Crowley (Wing), Mark Dostal (Apeman), Todd Foster (Scrumhalf), Christopher Woodley Gantt (Lock), John Gerst (Hooker), Eric C. Grace (Fullback), Brian Green (Center), Noah Hardie (Center), Matt Keiper (Lock), Daniel Marine (Prop), M.J. Marque III (Flanker), Steven McIlvaine (Wing), Brian T. Musselman (Prop), John Nemecek (Flanker), Brian Schafer (Flanker), Charles Thompson (Fullback), Kevin Turek (Flanker), Clinton Warner (Center/Wing), Jim Winner (2nd Row/Prop).

UC Berkeley

Qualified from Pacific Coast College Championships on April 22–24 in Santa Cruz, CA.

- UC Berkeley 12-6 Washington
- UC Berkeley 20-0 Oregon State
- UC Berkeley 59-17 Stanford

Record- 14–4
Coaches- Jack Clark, Dan Porter
Captains-Peter Codevilla (Lock)
Roster:
Tyler Applegate (Wing), Jeff Arreguy (Lock), Victor Arvizu (Hooker), John Ball (Center), Brad Bowers (Lock), Ovie Brume (Wing),Chris Carrigg (Center), Jonah Cave (Flanker), Ron Chisenhall (Hooker), Kevin Dalzell (Scrumhalf), Byron Deeter (Prop), Marshall Foran (Prop), Brian Frantz (Prop), Ray Green (Center), Eric Harmon (Fullback), Mark Hildebrand (Flanker), Derek Hitchcock (Flanker), Ben Juricek (Prop), Marc Launey (Flanker), Pete Morales (Flanker), Joe Motes (Flyhalf), Andrew Nolan (Wing), Henry Okwo (Center), John Reiter, Shap Roder (Flanker), George Romweber (Flanker), Jason Schwarz (Center), James Shaughnessy (Scrumhalf), Scott Snyder (Hooker), Rob Swanbeck (Center), Ian Tong (Fullback), Todd Williams (Scrumhalf), Kester Wise (Flyhalf).

== Bracket ==
Regional Semifinal
April 23 - Santa Cruz, CA
UC Berkeley	20
Oregon State	0
April 23 - Santa Cruz, CA
Stanford	17
Cal Poly SLO	3
April 16 - Houston, TX
Air Force	30
Sam Houston State	0
April 16 - Houston, TX
NE Missouri State	26
Arkansas	20
December 5 - Columbia, SC
Navy	24
Army	0
December 5 - Columbia, SC
Connecticut	20
Alabama	0
November 6 - Bowling Green, OH
Wisconsin	W
Ohio State	L
November 6 - Bowling Green, OH
Penn State	38
Notre Dame	16

Regional Final
April 24 - Santa Cruz, CA
UC Berkeley	59
Stanford	17
April 17 - Houston, TX
Air Force	43
NE Missouri State	12
December 6 - Columbia, SC
Navy	35
Connecticut	8
November 7 - Bowling Green, OH
Penn State	34
Wisconsin	8

National Semifinal
May 7 – Washington D.C.
UC Berkeley (Pacific)	42
Air Force (West)	21
May 7 – Washington D.C.
Navy (East)	35
Penn State (Midwest)	10

National Final
May 8 – Washington D.C.
UC Berkeley	27
Navy	13
Third place
May 8 – Washington D.C.
Air Force	24
Penn State	14

== Semifinals ==
7 May 1994
1:00PM

Navy	35–10	Penn State
Try: Matt Armas 3'; Dan Deciechi 10'; Brian Campbell 22' c Jeff Hoaglund 57' penalty try 75' c Con: Dan Deciechi; Pen: Todd Bruemer 27'; Dan Deciechi 44'		Try: Jeff Thompson 63' c Con: Bill King; Pen: Bill King 38'

Washington D.C.
Referee: Bob Loftus (USA)

7 May 1994
2:30PM

UC Berkeley	42–21	Air Force
Try: Brian Frantz 10' c Jonah Cave 34'; Ian Tong 49' c George Romwebber 72'; Con: Rob Swanbeck; Pen: Rob Swanbeck 8', 16', 39', 71', 72', Eric Harmon		Pen: Chris Eden 10', 23', 28', 32', 38', 41', 44'

Washington D.C.
Referee: Ed Sorenson (USA)

== Third place ==
8 May 1994
10:00 AM

Air Force	24–14	Penn State
Try: John Chastain 37'; Greg Bender 56'; Noah Hardie 65'; Pen: Chris Eden 8', 14', 47'		Try: Kurt Shuman 60' c Mike Feightner 72' c Con: Bill King (2)

Washington D.C.
Referee: Ed Sorenson (USA)

== Final ==
8 May 1994
2:00PM

UC Berkeley	27–13	Navy
Try: Ovie Brume 28'; Rob Swanbeck 63'c George Romweber 76' c Kevin Dalzell; Con: Rob Swanbeck (2); Pen: Rob Swanbeck 71'		Try: Dan Dedechi 5'; Eric Schuit 80'; Pen: Dan Deciechi 36'

Washington D.C.
Referee: Bob Loftus (USA)

== Women's College Championship ==
The 1994 Women's Collegiate Championship took place on Peavy Field at Oregon State University in Corvallis, OR from May 7–8. Boston College qualified by winning the East Coast Territorial championship. Penn State was the winner at the Midwest Territorial, Air Force qualified from the Western Regional. Oregon State represented the Pacific Coast. Air Force was the champion of this fourth edition. Air Force Wing Tracy Hubbard was named MVP of the tournament.

=== Semifinals ===
7 May 1994
10:00AM

Oregon State	21–26	Air Force
Try: Lora Barr 22' c, 67' c Con: Jennifer Fox		Try: Tracy Hubbard 18'; Rashelle Brown 55'

Corvallis, OR

7 May 1994
12:00PM

Boston College	15–13	Penn State
Try: Vicki Repa (2)

Corvallis, OR

=== Third place ===
8 May 1994
10:00AM

Oregon State	0–35	Penn State
		Try: Gwen Heintz; Ali Hynes; Ann Hollendener; Tara Kerr

Corvallis, OR

=== Final ===
8 May 1994
12:00PM

Air Force	7–3	Boston College
Try: Tracy Hubbard 15' c Con: Virginia Weldon		Pen: Shelly Curran 55'

Corvallis, OR
Referee: Ed Todd (NCRFU)

Champions: Air Force
Staff: Craig Baltz (Coach), Terri Katein–Taylor, Pete Smith
Captains: Tracy Smith, Yvonne Spencer
Roster: Andrea Kerman, Nicole Raney, Melissa Davidson, Stacey Georgilas, Tracy Hubbard, Joyce Gange, Heidi Wahlman, Patty Rodriguez–Rey, Virginia Weldon, Rashelle Brown, Carol Forner, Kandace Henry, Megan Monaghan, Cindy Green, Kerry Ellis, Melissa Baumann, Jennifer Hammerstead, Mary Hartman, April Drew, Elizabeth Templeton.

== College All–Stars ==
The 1994 National Collegiate All–Star Championship took place at Long Beach, CA from June 10–12. Similar to the All–Star Tournaments for club teams, the college competition is divided into geographic unions and used to select the All–American team that goes on to play other junior national rugby teams. The teams placed as follows: 1st Pacific Coast, 2nd Eastern RU, 3rd Midwest, 4th West.

3 June 1994
12:00PM

Pacific	W–L	West

Long Beach, CA

3 June 1994
2:00PM

Midwest	L–W	East

Long Beach, CA

4 June 1994
1:00PM

Midwest	W–L	West

Long Beach, CA

4 June 1994
3:00PM

Pacific	W–L	East

Long Beach, CA

== See also ==
1994 National Rugby Championships
