= Yale Bulldogs =

Intercollegiate sports teams of Yale University

- University: Yale University
- Nickname: Bulldogs
- NCAA: Division I (FCS)
- Conference: Ivy League (primary); ECAC Hockey; Eastern Association of Rowing Colleges; NEISA; CSA (squash)
- Athletic director: Victoria Chun
- Location: New Haven, Connecticut
- Varsity teams: 35 teams
- Football stadium: Yale Bowl
- Basketball arena: Payne Whitney Gym
- Ice hockey arena: Ingalls Rink
- Baseball stadium: Yale Field
- Softball stadium: DeWitt Family Stadium
- Soccer stadium: Reese Stadium
- Lacrosse stadium: Reese Stadium
- Sailing venue: Yale Corinthian Yacht Club
- Volleyball arena: Payne Whitney Gym
- Colors: Yale blue and white
- Mascot: Handsome Dan
- Fight song: "Bulldog"
- Website: yalebulldogs.com

The Yale Bulldogs are the college sports teams that represent Yale University, located in New Haven, Connecticut. The school sponsors 35 varsity sports. The school has won two NCAA national championships (and one AIAW championship) in women's fencing, four in men's swimming and diving, 21 in men's golf, one in men's hockey, and one in men's lacrosse.

Originally inspired by varsity matches between Oxford University and Cambridge University in England, Yale and Harvard influenced the development of college athletics in the United States.

In 1970 the NCAA banned Yale from participating in all NCAA sports for two years, in reaction to Yale—against the wishes of the NCAA—playing Jack Langer in college games after Langer had played for Team United States at the 1969 Maccabiah Games in Israel with the approval of Yale President Kingman Brewster. The decision impacted 300 Yale students, every Yale student on its sports teams, over the next two years.

== Sports ==
Men's sports	Women's sports
Baseball	Basketball
Basketball	Crew
Crew	Cross country
Cross country	Fencing
Fencing	Field hockey
Football	Golf
Golf	Gymnastics
Ice hockey	Ice hockey
Lacrosse	Lacrosse
Rugby (club)	Soccer
Sailing	Softball
Soccer	Squash
Squash	Swimming & diving
Swimming & diving	Tennis
Tennis	Track & field ^{1}
Track & field ^{1}	Volleyball
Co-ed sports
Sailing
^{1} – includes both indoor and outdoor

== Men's sports ==
=== Baseball ===
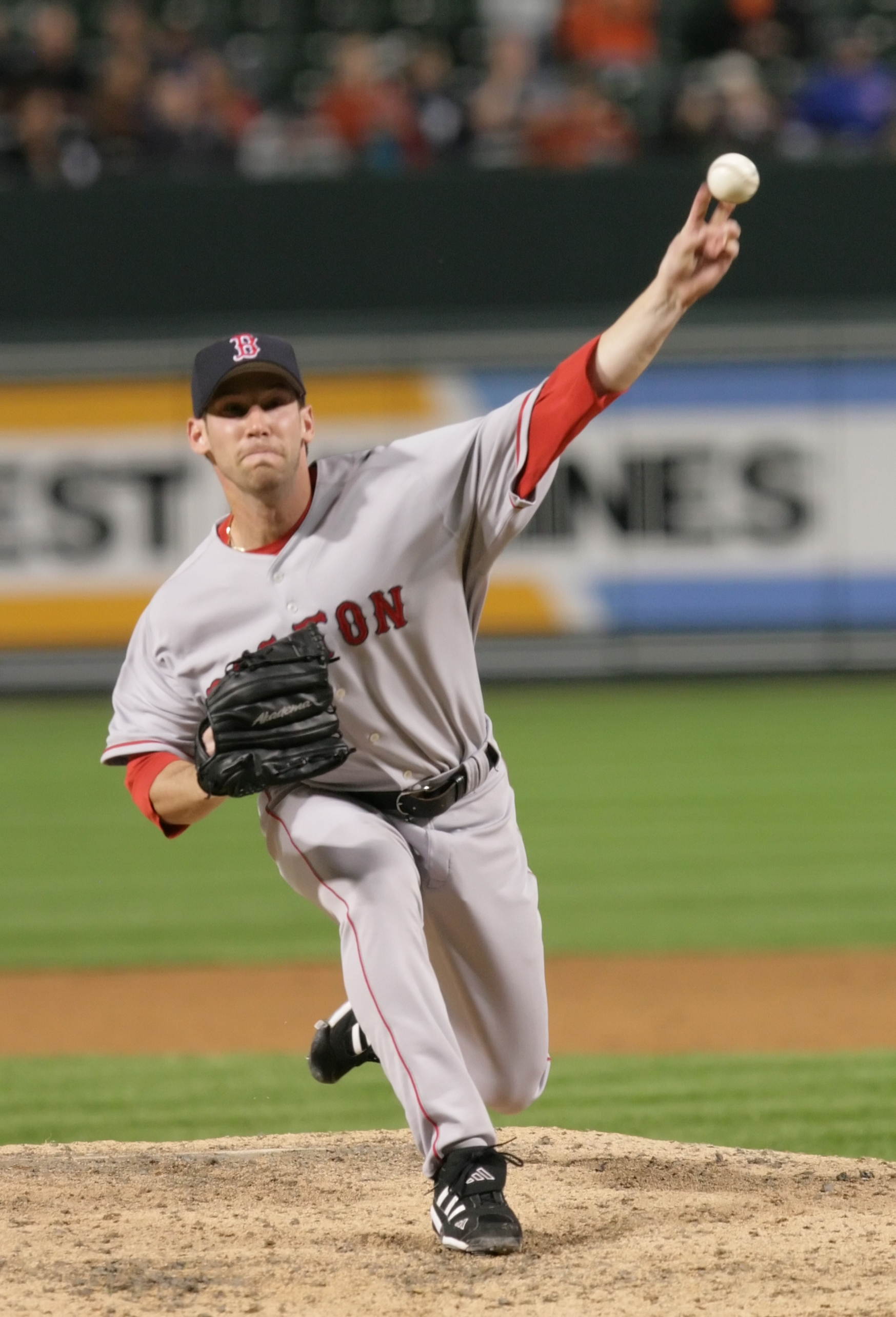
Craig Breslow

Major leaguers pitcher Craig Breslow (Oakland A's and Boston Red Sox) and catcher Ryan Lavarnway (Boston Red Sox/Los Angeles Dodgers), among others, played baseball for the Bulldogs. Perhaps Yale's most notable baseball player, however, was future U.S. president George H. W. Bush, who played for the Bulldogs in the late 1940s.

Breslow led the Ivy League with a 2.56 ERA in 2002. Lavarnway led the NCAA in batting average (.467) and slugging percentage (.873) in 2007, set the Ivy League hitting-streak record (25), and through 2010 held the Ivy League record in career home runs (33). In August 2012, Breslow and Lavarnway, playing for the Red Sox, became the first Yale grads to be Major League teammates since 1949.

=== Men's basketball ===
The men's basketball team has been named national champion on six occasions – in 1896, 1897, 1899, and 1900 by the Premo-Porretta Power Poll, which began retroactive selections with the 1895–96 season; and in 1901 and 1903 by the Helms Athletic Foundation, which began retroactive selections with the 1900–01 season. Penn and Yale played in the First College Basketball game with 5 men on a team in 1897.

Yale has won seven Ivy League championships – 1957, 1962, 1963, 2002, 2016, 2019 and 2020. It also won the Eastern Intercollegiate Basketball League, the forerunner to the Ivy League, eight times – 1902, 1903, 1907, 1915, 1917, 1923, 1933 and 1949.

=== Football ===
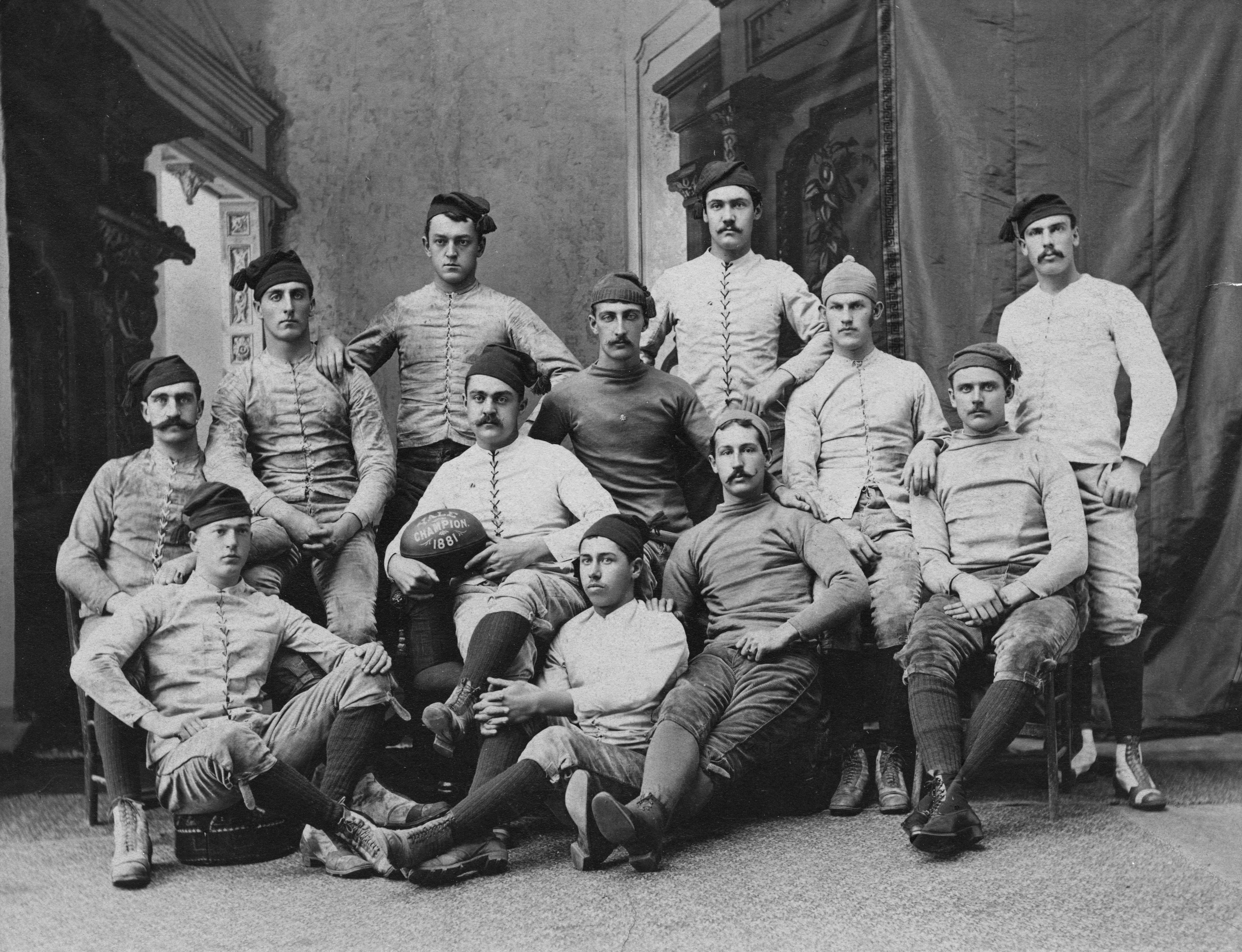
Yale team of 1881, national champions. The team has won 27 titles to date

The football team has competed since 1876. They have won nineteen national championships when the school competed in what is now known as the FBS. They are perhaps best known for their rivalry with Harvard, known as "The Game". Twenty one former players have been inducted into the College Football Hall of Fame.

The Bulldogs were the dominant team in the early days of intercollegiate football, winning 27 college football national championships, including 26 in 38 years between 1872 and 1909. Walter Camp, known as the "Father of Football," graduated from Hopkins Grammar School in 1876, and played college football at Yale College from 1876 to 1882. He later served as the head football coach at Yale from 1888 to 1892. It was Camp who pioneered the fundamental transition of American football from rugby when in 1880, he succeeded in convincing the Intercollegiate Football Association to discontinue the rugby "scrum", and instead have players line up along a "line of scrimmage" for individual plays, which begin with the snap of the ball and conclude with the tackling of the ballcarrier.

=== Men's golf ===
Robert Hunter

The Yale Men's Golf Team has won 21 collegiate team championships (all except 1943 were bestowed by the National Intercollegiate Golf Association): 1897, 1898 (spring), 1902 (spring), 1905–13, 1915, 1924–26, 1931–33, 1936, 1943. They have crowned 13 individual champions: John Reid, Jr. (1898, spring), Charles Hitchcock, Jr. (1902, fall), Robert Abbott (1905), W. E. Clow, Jr. (1906), Ellis Knowles (1907), Robert Hunter (1910), George Stanley (1911), Nathaniel Wheeler (1913), Francis Blossom (1915), Jess Sweetser (1920), Dexter Cummings (1923, 1924), Tom Aycock (1929). Both are records. They have won 12 Ivy League championships since the League championship was started in 1975: 1984–85, 1988, 1990–91, 1996–97, 2003, 2011, 2018, 2022, 2024. Both the Men's and Women's Golf Teams play out of the Yale Golf Course which has been ranked the best collegiate golf course in the country by Golfweek.com as well as other news outlets.

=== Men's ice hockey ===
The Yale Men's Ice Hockey team is the oldest existing intercollegiate hockey program, having played its first game in 1896 against Johns Hopkins (a 2–2 tie). The team competes in the ECAC Hockey League (ECACHL); in addition the Ivy League also crowns a champion for its members that field varsity ice hockey. The Bulldogs (coached by Keith Allain) won the 2013 NCAA National Championship in Pittsburgh with a 4–0 shutout of Quinnipiac University.

=== Men's soccer ===
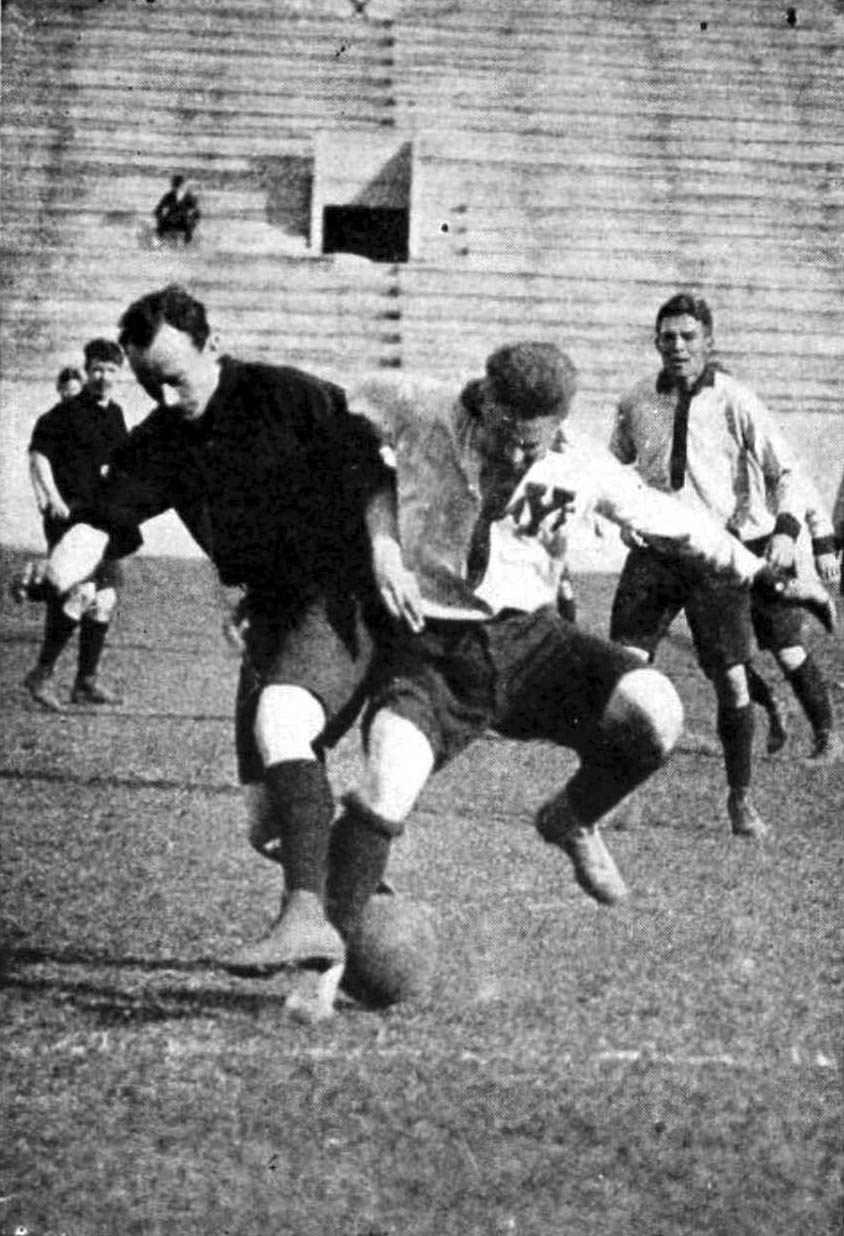
Yale (white shirts) vs Harvard game in 1922

Yale's first attempts with "kicking games" have roots in the 1860s, when the University, along with Princeton, Rutgers, and Brown, started to play a form of football that resembled the Association game. Nevertheless, after a rugby football played v Harvard in 1875, Yale dropped the association football in favor of rugby.

Before the NCAA began its tournament in 1959, the annual national champion was declared by the Intercollegiate Association Football League (IAFL) — from 1911 to 1926 — and then the Intercollegiate Soccer Football Association (ISFA), from 1927 to 1958. From 1911 to 1958, Yale won four national championships.

=== Men's tennis ===
Irvin Dorfman played tennis for Yale (1947), and was later ranked No. 15 in singles in the United States in 1947, and No. 3 in doubles in the U.S. in 1948. In 1946 he won the Eastern Intercollegiate Tennis Title.

Richard Raskind, later known as Renée Richards, was captain of the 1954 men's team and later became a professional female tennis player.

== Women's sports ==
=== Women's crew ===
In 1976, the nineteen members of the Yale women's crew wrote "TITLE IX" on their bodies and went into athletic director Joni Barnett's office and took off their clothes, and then rower Chris Ernst read a statement about the way they were being treated. This protest was noted by newspapers around the world, including The New York Times. By 1977, a women's locker room was added to Yale's boathouse. (Previously, there was no bathroom available for the women's crew team, so they had to wait on the bus after practice while the men showered before they could return to campus.) This protest was chronicled in the 1999 documentary A Hero For Daisy.

=== Women's soccer ===
The Bulldogs women's soccer team has two Ivy League Conference Champion titles (1992, 2005) and has made three appearances in the NCAA College Cup (2002, 2004, and 2005). In 2005, the team won a school record 15 games, won the first outright team Ivy League title in Yale history, and advanced to the third round of the NCAA College Cup for the first time in school history.

In 2019, former long-term head coach Rudy Meredith was indicted as part of the 2019 college admissions bribery scandal for allegedly accepting bribes totaling hundreds of thousands of dollars to facilitate the admission of students to Yale as soccer players recruited to the Yale women's soccer team, despite their never having played competitive soccer. Meredith was key to the FBI's investigation after authorities first became aware of a potential scheme after being offered information about Meredith during an unrelated case. Meredith's cooperation led federal investigators to uncover the larger bribery ring. In November 2018, four months before the scandal was revealed to the public, a statement from Yale University Department of Athletics announced Meredith's resignation after 24 seasons as head coach but had not listed a reason for the decision.. Meredith pleaded guilty as part of his cooperation and was sentenced to 5 months in prison, one year probation, and a $19,000 fine.

== Notable non-varsity sports ==
=== Rugby ===
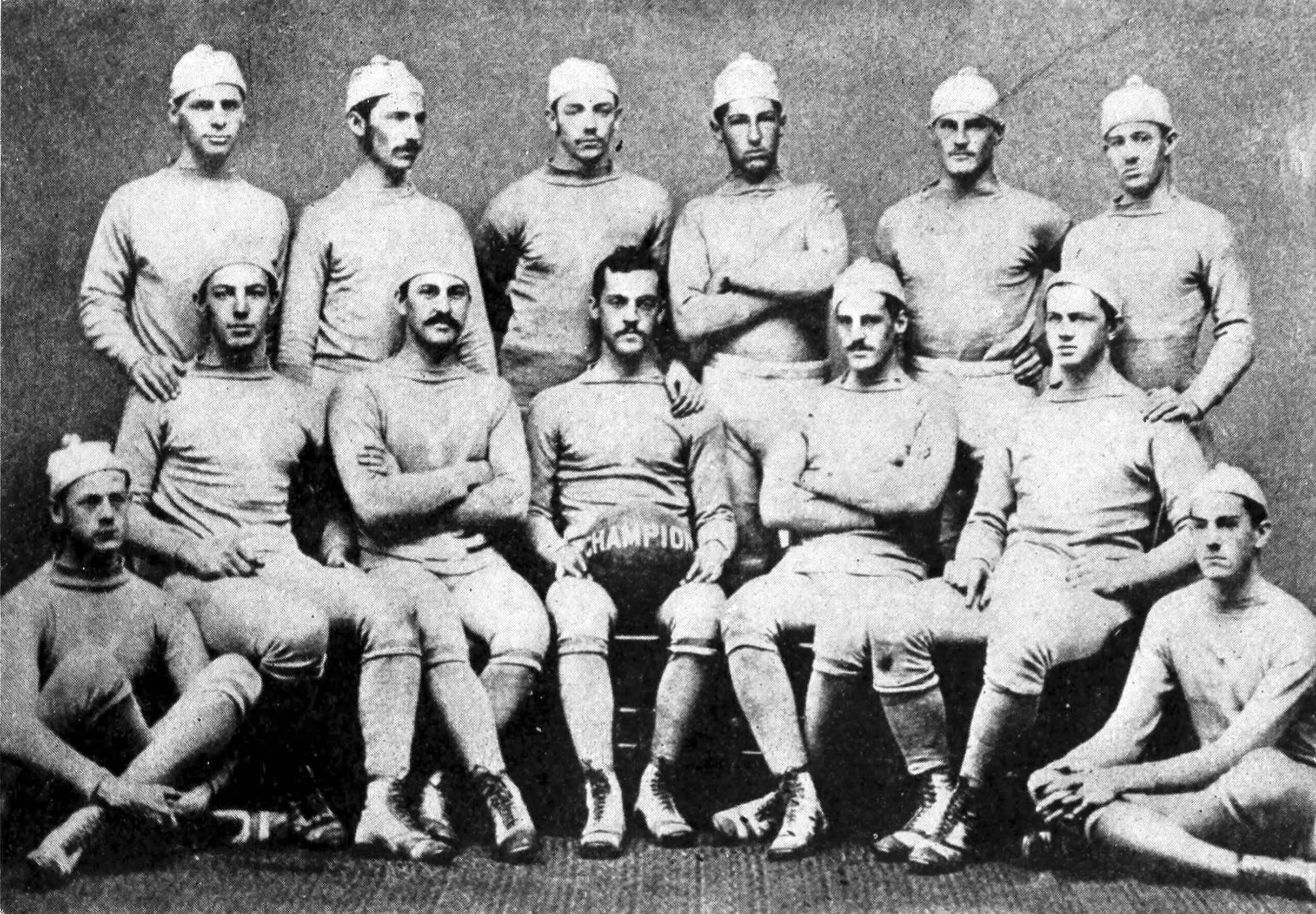
First Yale team to play the rugby game, 1876

Yale Rugby was founded in 1875, making it one of the oldest rugby teams in North America. The date refers to the first Harvard vs Yale contest held in 1875, two years after the inaugural Princeton–Yale football contest. Harvard athlete Nathaniel Curtis challenged Yale's captain, William Arnold to a rugby-style game. The next season Curtis was captain. He took one look at Walter Camp, then only 156 pounds, and told Yale captain Gene Baker "You don't mean to let that child play, do you? . . . He will get hurt."

Yale rugby plays college rugby in Division 1 in the Ivy Rugby Conference. Yale Rugby was founded in 1875, making it one of the oldest rugby teams in North America. President George W. Bush played rugby for Yale during his student days.

== Championships ==
=== NCAA team championships ===
Yale has 29 NCAA team national championships.

- Men's (27)
  - Golf ^{†} (21): 1897, 1898, 1902, 1905, 1906, 1907, 1908, 1909, 1910, 1911, 1912, 1913, 1915, 1924, 1925, 1926, 1931, 1932, 1933, 1936, 1943
  - Ice Hockey (1): 2013
  - Lacrosse (1): 2018
  - Swimming (4): 1942, 1944, 1951, 1953
- Women's (2)
  - Fencing (2): 1984, 1985

† The NCAA started sponsoring the intercollegiate golf championship in 1939, but it retained the titles from the 41 championships previously conferred by the National Intercollegiate Golf Association in its records.

=== Other ===
Yale has won 32 other national titles in various sports prior to the inception of NCAA championships: 3x men's rowing (1873, 1888, 2022); baseball (1893); men's cross country (1901); 6x men's 3-weapon fencing (1925, 1926, 1928–1930, 1932); women's fencing (1982); 2x men's gymnastics (1901, 1902); men's indoor tennis (1931); 3x men's indoor track (1933, 1954, 1961); 9x men's outdoor track (1887, 1889, 1893–1896, 1902–04); 5x men's soccer (1908, 1912, 1928, 1930, 1935).

=== Notable alumni ===
- Sada Jacobson (born 1983), Olympic fencing saber silver and bronze medalist, and 2-time NCAA champion.
- see also:
  - Ivy League NCAA team championships
  - List of NCAA schools with the most NCAA Division I championships

== See also ==
- List of NCAA schools with the most Division I national championships
- 2019 college admissions bribery scandal
