= History of rugby union in the United States =

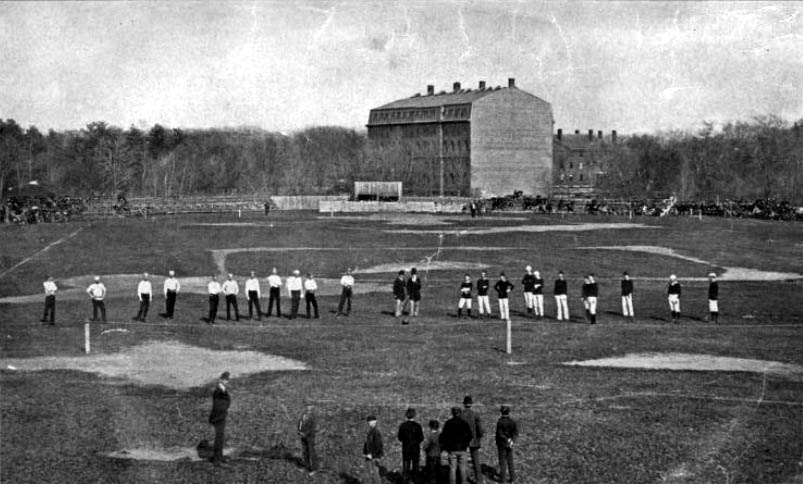
The second game Between Harvard and McGill of 1874 were played under the rugby rules, becoming the first rugby match in the US

The first recorded match between two colleges in game played in United States using rugby union code rules occurred on May 14, 1874 between Harvard University and McGill University. Predating rugby using the rugby union rules were forms of football "carrying games" with use of hands permitted (as opposed to "kicking games" where hands were not permitted) including a game between Harvard College Freshmen and Sophomores at a game played at Harvard campus in 1858. Harvard varsity interscholastic rugby team was not founded until December 6, 1872

In addition to Harvard rugby, Columbia Rugby, and Princeton Rugby, University of Pennsylvania and Yale College first fielded rugby teams in mid 1870s essentially playing by the rugby union code rules (relative to American football rules, as such American football rules had not yet been invented). An example of Penn's earliest games was a game against College of New Jersey (which in 1895 changed its name to Princeton) played in Philadelphia on Saturday, November 11, 1876, which was less than two weeks before Princeton met on November 23, 1876 with Harvard and Columbia to confirm that all their games would be played using the rugby union rules. Princeton and Penn played their November 1876 game per a combination of rugby (there were 20 players per side and players were able to touch the ball with their hands) and association football codes. The rugby union code influence was due, in part, to the fact that some of their students had been educated in English public schools and by 1869 Princeton was playing with rules substantially identical to rugby.

Among the prominent college players to play in a 19th century version of rugby (rules that did not allow forward passes or center snaps) was John Heisman, namesake of the Heisman Trophy and an 1892 graduate of the University of Pennsylvania Law School and Walter Camp of Yale. Heisman and Camp were instrumental in the first decade of the 20th century in changing the rules to more closely relate to present rules of American football.From the point in time of the 1882 change to introduce the five-yard-in-three-downs rule, the game in the USA was no longer rugby union.

Football clubs adopting rugby union laws existed at least since the 1880s in San Francisco, and grew in the early 1900s, spurred in part by American football's crisis of 1905–06 due to the perception that American football was a violent sport. During this era, rugby union was perceived as having the potential to challenge American football as the dominant football code on the west coast. For example, from 1906 to 1912 University of Pennsylvania (aka Penn) team played per rugby union code rules even after Penn started playing American gridiron football. Evidence of such may be found in an October 22, 1910, Daily Pennsylvanian article (quoted below) and a yearbook photo that rugby per rugby union code was played.

Such is the devotion to English rugby football on the part of University of Pennsylvania's students from New Zealand, Australia, and England that they meet on Franklin Field at 7 o'clock every morning and practice the game. The varsity track and football squads monopolize the field to such an extent that the early hours of the morning are the only ones during which the rugby enthusiasts can play. Any time except Friday, Saturday and Sunday, a squad of 25 men may be seen running through the hardest kind of practice after which they may divide into two teams and play a hard game. Once a week, captain CC Walton, ('11), dental, who hails from New Zealand, gives the enthusiastic players a blackboard talk in which he explains the intricacies of the game in detail.

Led by Cal and Stanford, a number of universities of the West Coast took a different path and did not play rugby union alongside American football BUT instead eliminated America football and changed their game to Rugby union. Other schools that made the switch included Nevada, St. Mary's, Santa Clara, and USC (in 1911).In 1910 a combined American Universities team visited Australia and New Zealand. Visits were made to play teams on the West Coast by the Australian (Wallabies) on their 1909 tour and 1912 tour, and New Zealand (All Blacks) in 1906 tour and 1913 tour.

At the 1920 Summer Olympics in Antwerp, a United States rugby team (composed largely of players from the University of California and Stanford University) defeated France to win the gold medal. Rugby union was again included in the 1924 Summer Olympics in Paris, where the United States defeated France for the gold. The player-coach of the United States Olympic gold-winning rugby team at the 1924 Summer Olympics was Alan Valentine, who played rugby for Swarthmore College and also played while at Penn (as he was getting a Master's degree at Wharton School of Finance of University of Pennsylvania).

Despite this success, however, rugby in the United States was surpassed by American gridiron football but Dartmouth, Penn, and Yale on East Coast played intermittently from the 30s through the 50s and University of California never stopped playing from the last decade of the 19th century through to the present.

Princeton and Harvard teams played using rugby union code continuously since the early 1930s (as detailed below). The present Princeton Rugby team was reorganized in 1931 under the leadership of Monte Barak, Hugh Sloan, H.F. Langenberg, and coach John Boardman Whitton and has been playing continuously ever since. Similarly Harvard Rugby has continuously played since the early 1930s. Indeed, over 5,000 people attended the inaugural Harvard - Princeton game in 1931.

Yale Rugby teams played using rugby union rules continuously since the late 1940s and Dartmouth Rugby teams continuously played per rugby union rules since it was reorganized in 1951.

Rugby union in the United States revival beyond University of California and Stanford University on West Coast and certain Universities (which became part of the Ivy League in the mid-1950s) accelerated in the 1960s and 1970s, as many other colleges and universities started club rugby teams. Among the first was the University of Vermont Rugby Football Club, founded by Professor David Scrase. USA Rugby, the body that governs rugby in the U.S., was founded in 1975. On 31 January 1976, the U.S. national team played Australia—in its first official match since the 1924 Olympics—before 7,000 fans at Glover Field in Los Angeles. The United States national team participated in the inaugural 1987 Rugby World Cup. Rugby in the U.S. received a significant boost in 2009 when the International Olympic Committee voted to reinstate rugby into the Summer Olympics beginning in 2016.

Professional competition of rugby union began in 2016, PRO Rugby, and the currently-sanctioned top-level professional league, Major League Rugby (MLR), began play in 2018. Major League Rugby implemented its first collegiate MLR Draft in 2020. Players are eligible for draft after 3 years in college at 21 years old. Free agents can try to join teams at 18 years old.

College rugby is the fastest-growing college sport in the US. Rugby union is also the fastest growing-sport in the US.

== Early football variants ==
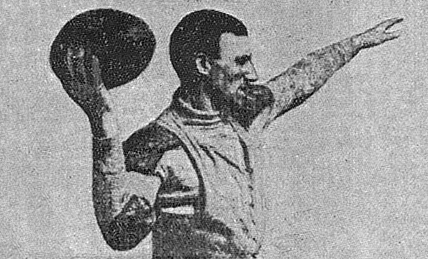
Early American footballs were essentially rugby balls, later redesigned to make them easier to throw forward.

Early European settlers in North America brought forms of medieval and traditional football with them. However, we know that in 1610, William Strachey, an English colonist at Jamestown, Virginia recorded a game played by Native Americans, called Pahsaheman, so it is clear that they had their own codes as well. Early games appear to have had much in common with the traditional "mob football" played in England. The games remained largely unorganized until the 19th century, when intramural games of football began to be played on college campuses. Each school played its own variety of football.

Princeton students played a game called "ballown" as early as 1820. A Harvard tradition known as "Bloody Monday" began in 1827, which consisted of a mass ballgame between the freshman and sophomore classes. Dartmouth played its own version called "Old division football", the rules of which were first published in 1871, though the game dates to at least the 1830s. All of these games, and others, shared certain commonalities. They remained largely "mob" style games, with huge numbers of players attempting to advance the ball into a goal area, often by any means necessary. Rules were simple and violence and injury were common. The violence of these mob-style games led to widespread protests and a decision to abandon them. Yale, under pressure from the city of New Haven, banned the play of all forms of football in 1860, while Harvard followed suit in 1861.

== Early U.S. rugby history: 1800s ==
The sport of rugby union in the United States has always had a close relationship with the sport of American football. Initially, games of rugby, soccer, and hybrid games had been played between American universities. Primitive forms of rugby, then all covered by the name "football", were being played in the US as far back as the 1840s, at Harvard, Yale and Princeton, stemming partly from Americans who had been educated in English schools. However, in 1862, Yale dealt it a major blow by banning it for being too violent and dangerous, about seven years later, in 1869, the first game of rugby football was played between Princeton and Rutgers. the rules of the Princeton–Rutgers game were a form of rugby that predates the adoption of rugby union code and did not allow forward passing. However, rugby union was taking a firm grip of a number of elite private academic schools (that would form the Ivy League in the mid 1950s), University of California and other East Coast and West Coast Universities, where it would have an influence on the nascent gridiron, which later became its major competitor. American football's growth came at exactly the point at which rugby was beginning to establish itself in the States. Rugby spread through America's colleges, away from the Ivy League and the East Coast, into Texas, California and other west coast states. However, because of America's huge size, this resulted in a bipolar game, played mainly in east and west, but not really in the middle – other than Illinois and the Great Lakes, and Texas in the south. There would also come to be a small rugby-playing centre in Salt Lake City, as Polynesian Mormons came to study and live there, and to a lesser extent by returning missionaries.

In 1872, rugby clubs were established in the San Francisco Bay Area, composed mainly of British expatriates.

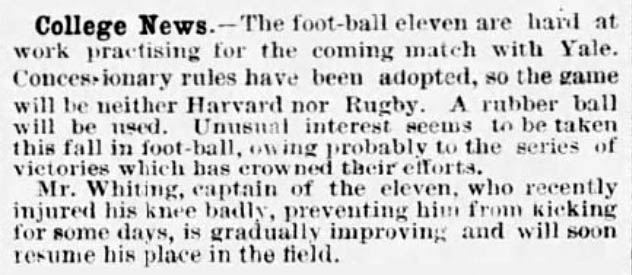
Harvard v Yale game played under the "concessionary rules" in 1875, the first rugby-style game between US-based colleges

In 1875, Harvard athlete Nathaniel Curtis challenged Yale's captain, William Arnold to a rugby-style game. The two teams agreed to play under a set of rules called the "Concessionary Rules", which involved Harvard conceding something to Yale's soccer and Yale conceding a great deal to Harvard's rugby. The game featured a round ball instead of a rugby-style oblong ball, and caused Yale to drop association football in favor of rugby.

In 1876, Yale, Harvard, Princeton, and Columbia formed the Intercollegiate Football Association, a competition based on the traditional rules of rugby union. Around the same time, the aforementioned British rugby players of San Francisco introduced rugby to the University of California, Berkeley.

A persistent problem within rugby football would be the question of amateurism vs professionalism. American football would take the professional route, something much frowned upon by the leadership of the rugby fraternity at the time. This was leading to crises in the Old World too, where in 1895, the Northern Rugby Football Union (a rugby league body) split away in England. While rugby league failed to gain much headway in North America, the financial draw of professional American football proved too strong for some American rugby players. Rugby union would not become professional officially until the 1995.

== Rugby and American football ==
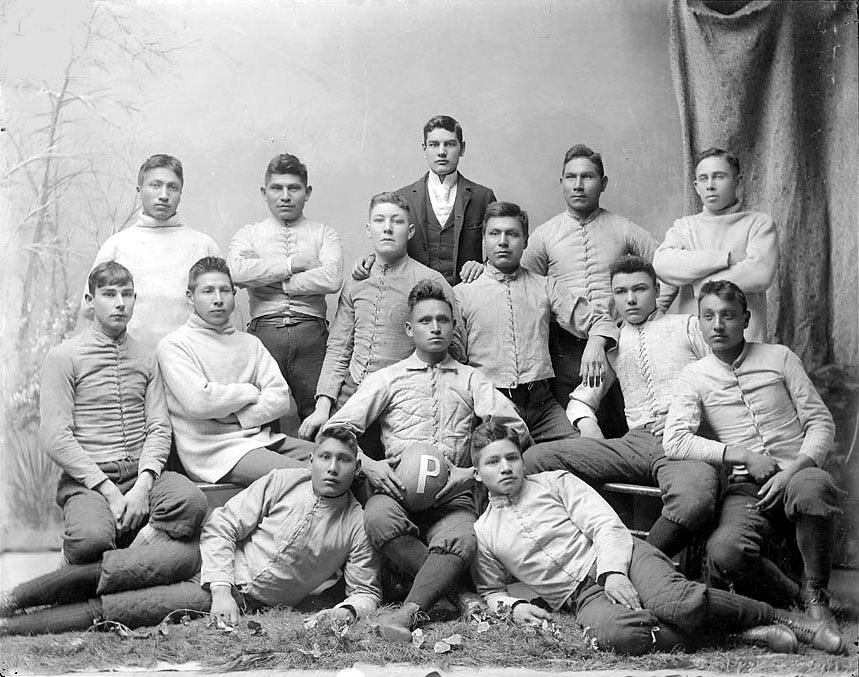
"The Pirates", Carlisle Indians college football team of 1879

Rugby has had a long and complicated relationship with American football, which was based upon American variants of rugby football and association football. Another important point is that during the 19th century, the United States was trying to develop a new national culture, independent of its English colonial roots, as it had become politically independent the previous century. This extended into the sporting arena, with the adoption and invention of American football, basketball, and volleyball, and also the myth of Abner Doubleday founding baseball, which attempted to divorce it from its English origins.

Unlike football, rugby has established itself through the United States via its colleges and universities.

By the end of the 19th century, rugby's American offspring had outgrown its parent within America, and many young Americans who would have made good rugby players were steered into American football instead.

Nonetheless, some of rugby's legacy can be seen in American football to this day, including its prolate spheroid football, rucking, and elevated goalposts of similar width. Major differences include higher tackles than rugby, protective equipment, and forward passing. The fair catch kick is a relic of the now obsolete goal from mark. The scoring systems have evolved in parallel, with both rugby union and American football offering three points for a kicked goal and seven points for a ball run into the end zone and a successfully kicked conversion.

== Early 1900s ==
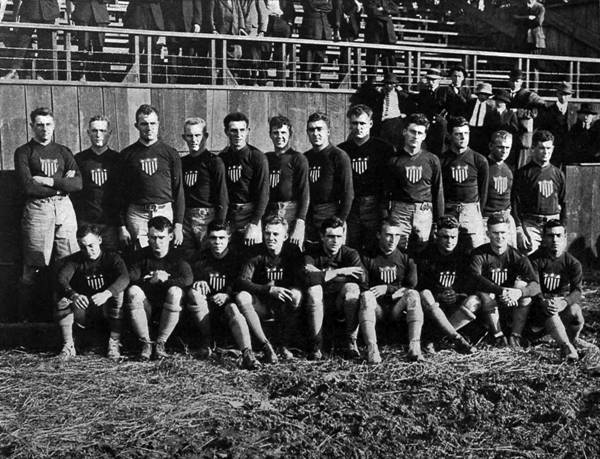
The United States side that played Australia at California Field during the Wallabies' 1912 tour of Canada and the United States

One factor aiding in rugby's growth in the early 1900s was American football's crisis of 1905–06, with President Teddy Roosevelt engaging in a debate about the future of American football in response to the perception that American football was a violent sport.

The growth of rugby in the United States and particularly in California was aided by the 1905 New Zealand national team, known as The Originals, playing three matches in the U.S. in early 1906 —one exhibition match in New York, and two exhibition matches in California against teams from British Columbia. Apart from the high standard of rugby in various parts of Canada, it was not uncommon for Australian and New Zealand sides to play games in the US – especially California and New York – when returning from Europe, or when European teams made the trip the other way.

Some west coast colleges—including the flagship University of California, Stanford University, and Santa Clara—abandoned their American football programs in favor of rugby. The "Big Game" American football rivalry between Cal and Stanford was played as a rugby match instead of American football from 1906 to 1914 (1906 was notable for being the first year that American football had legalized the forward pass, a system that would become a distinguishing characteristic in the American game that is not present in rugby).

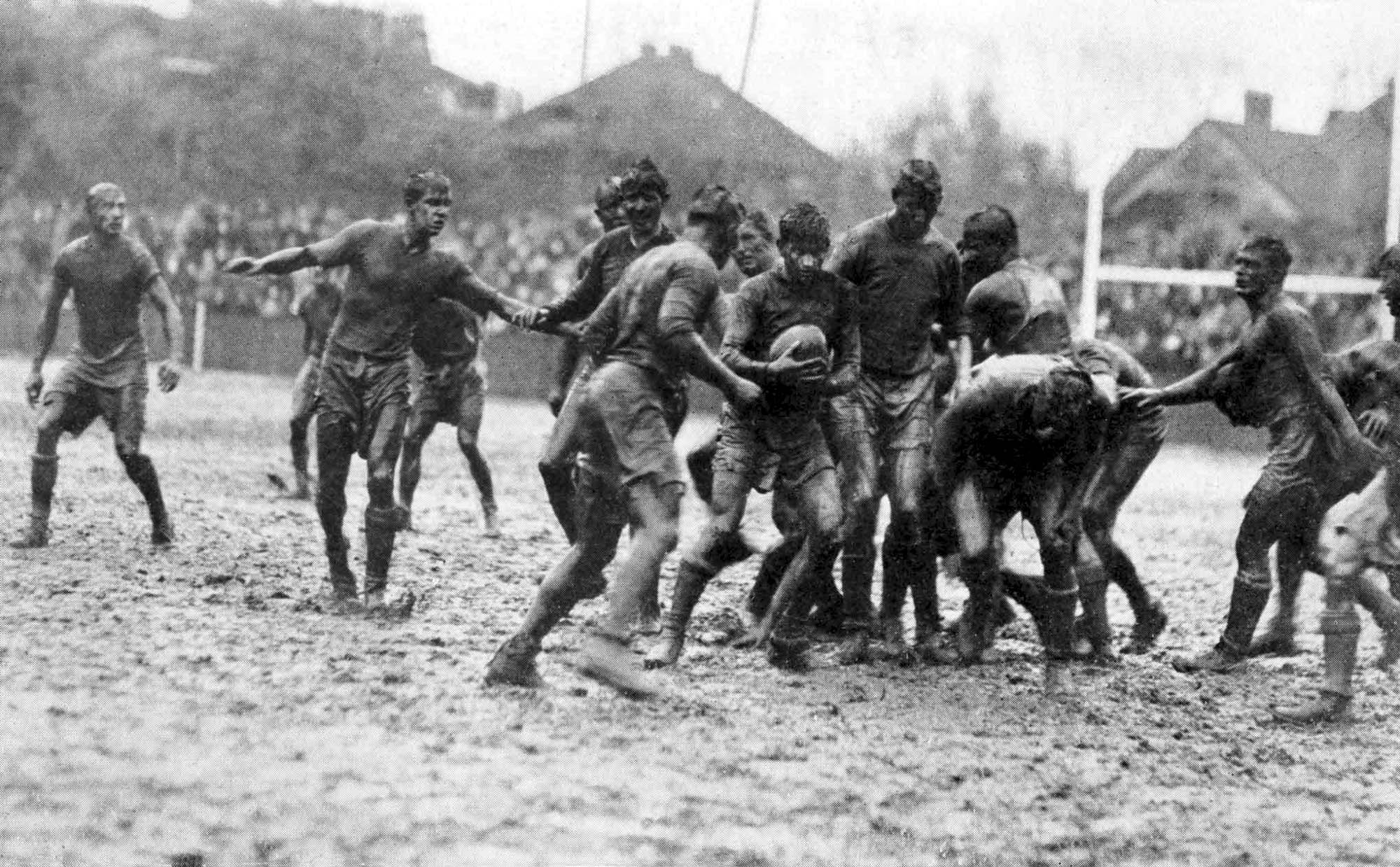
From 1906 to 1914, the Big Game (American football) was played under the rules of rugby union. The picture shows the 1912 edition of the series

Rugby union grew on the West Coast, and as many as 26,000 spectators regularly attended matches between the University of California and Stanford University. During this era, rugby was perceived as having the potential to challenge American football as the dominant football code on the west coast.

The unfamiliar and complex game play hampered rugby's initial growth on the East Coast. Controversy arose in 1905 when published photographs of a rugby match between Swarthmore College and the University of Pennsylvania were used to depict rugby as a "harsh game".

In 1908 and 1909, the Australian national team visited the U.S. as part of an international tour, playing university teams and an all-California side.

In 1910, a combined Universities rugby team comprising mostly players from Cal, Stanford, and the University of Nevada went on a tour of Australia and New Zealand. The underdog American side upset both Rotorua RFC and Auckland RU, which came as a great surprise to the international rugby community. In 1910, D.W. Wheeler of the University of California wrote that "rugby throughout the state is on the boom," with five out of six San Francisco high schools having taken up rugby.

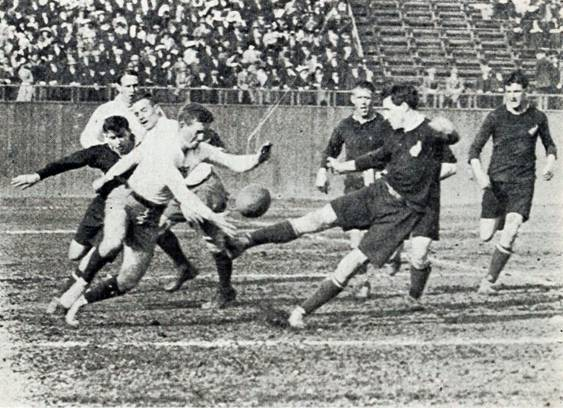
The USA v New Zealand test, 15 Nov 1913

In 1912, the Australian national team returned to America; this tour was the first and only America-specific tour by Australia to date. Stanford University defeated the Australian national team 13–12 on 16 October 1912, with the San Francisco Examiner declaring that the win had "raised America to a position among the first-class rugby nations." Australia's 1912 tour of the United States saw the United States national team play their first international test against Australia. The United States performed well, holding a lead in the second half, before losing 12–8. The San Francisco Chronicle declared that "America has arrived on the international map" and predicted that the U.S. "will be looking down upon all the other nations in a few more years."

After a promising start on the international stage, the Americans were thrashed 51–3 a year later by a strong All Blacks side in their tour on North America. This test was organized by former Cal president Benjamin Ide Wheeler in an attempt to popularize rugby among his students.

By 1915, rugby in California was already beginning to decline. The University of California returned to American football in 1915–1916. Once the University of California returned to American football, a number of local schools quickly followed.

The vastness of the US has resulted in the rise of regional "Conferences", where the East and West played as different blocs. Hawaii and Alaska led completely separate rugby existences, focusing their energy on their South Seas, and British Columbian neighbors instead. Until recently this vastness also caused problems in the preparation of a national team, as the players would rarely get to meet one another.

== Olympics gold: 1920 & 1924 ==
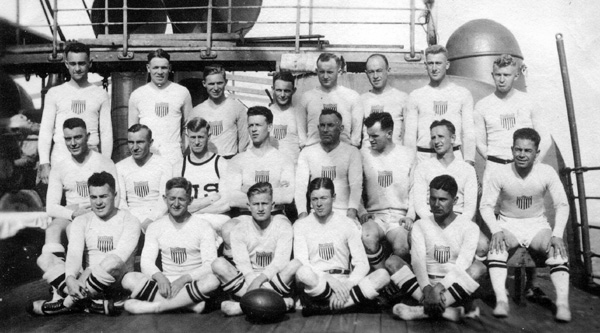
The 1920 USA rugby team, gold medal at the 1920 Summer Olympics

The U.S. national team played and won their first test outside of the US in 1919, defeating Romania in Paris.

Rugby union made its Olympic debut at the 1920 Summer Olympics in Antwerp. Money was raised in San Francisco to send the United States team, a side composed largely of players from Stanford University and coached by Dan Carroll. They defeated France 8–0 to win the gold medal in front of 25,000 spectators.

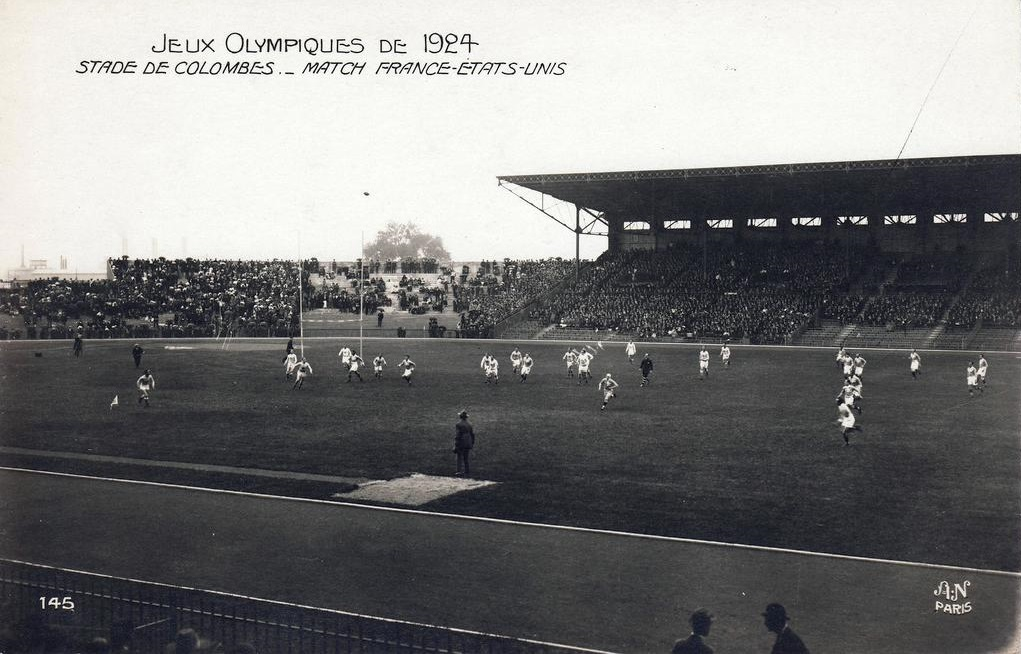
France playing the USA in the 1924 Olympics final

In 1924, rugby union was again included in the 1924 Summer Olympics in Paris. An American side was invited to participate, and the team surprised spectators by landing a place in the final with the hosts – the French. An estimated 30,000 turned up to Colombes Stadium to watch. The United States defeated France for the gold in 1924. The player-coach of United States Olympic gold-winning rugby team at the 1924 Summer Olympics was Alan Valentine, who played rugby for Swarthmore College and at the University of Pennsylvania while obtaining a Master's degree at Wharton School of Finance.

This was, however, the last time until 2016 that rugby featured at the Olympics, and the last ever for the full 15-man version of the game (the return of rugby in 2016 was in the sevens version). As a result, the 1924 United States team is the last to win gold in the full version of rugby union. Rare vintage footage of the 1924 Gold Medal match was included in the rugby documentary, A Giant Awakens: the Rise of American Rugby.

== 1930s–1950s: Attempted introduction of rugby league ==
In the mid twentieth-century, rugby union continued to be a purely amateur sport, unlike American football and the breakaway rugby league. Rugby league didn't make much headway in the US, for the simple reason that many rugby players who wished to go professional could go into the NFL instead, where there was better pay. The expansion of rugby league was frequently at the expense of rugby union elsewhere.

An early attempt to introduce rugby league was in 1939, when the Californian Rugby Football Union wrote to the governing body of rugby league, the Rugby Football League, to tell them they wanted to switch from rugby union and affiliate to the RFL. The timing was unfortunate, and the RFL was unable to send out a delegation due to the outbreak of World War II in Europe. California was one of the historic heartlands of rugby union in the US.

However, during the war itself, American servicemen stationed abroad occasionally played matches against teams from other allied sides – these included those from the British, Australian and South African militaries.

Another postwar attempt to introduce rugby league to the US took place in 1953, when wrestling promoter Mike Dimitro was asked to organize a tour of Australasia by an American rugby league team. However, this failed to generate much interest, and none of the team had ever played rugby league before the tour. Dimitrio did persist though, by holding exhibition games against the Australian and New Zealand rugby league teams, again in California. Dimitrio later tried to bring a Rugby League World Cup to the US, but this also failed. The code of rugby played in the US to this day remains mainly of the union variety.

== Modern history: 1960s–2000s ==
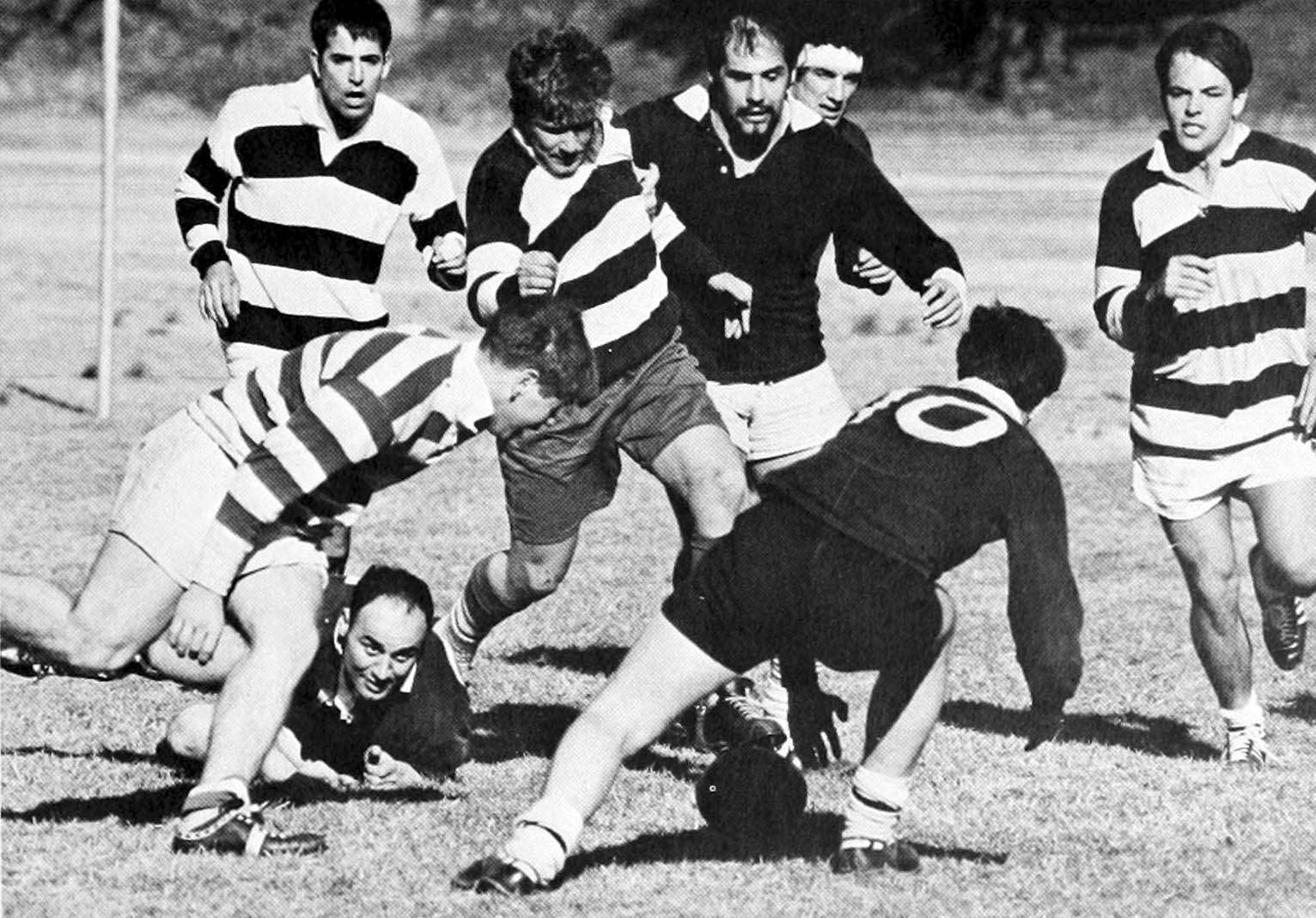
Duke Blue Devils rugby match in 1968

Rugby began its revival in the United States in the late 1950s and into the 1960s and 1970s, as many colleges started club rugby teams. Rugby began getting some coverage in the media, including in the New York Times, when 1958 Heisman Trophy winner Pete Dawkins played for Oxford against Cambridge in 1959. The first rugby sevens tournament in the U.S. was played during Thanksgiving weekend in 1959 in New York with eight teams from various northeast colleges.

USA Rugby, the body that governs rugby in the U.S., was founded in 1975. On 31 January 1976, the U.S. national team played Australia—in its first official match since the 1924 Olympics—before approximately 7,000 fans at Glover Field in Los Angeles. In 1980, USA Rugby formed a National Collegiate Rugby Championship tournament. In 1987, the U.S. national team participated in the inaugural Rugby World Cup.

The U.S. women's national team was officially formed in 1987. The team would go onto win the inaugural Women's World Cup in 1991.

The Rugby Super League, a nationwide club competition, was played from 1996 to 2012. From 2003 to 2011, the U.S. national team played in the Churchill Cup, with the U.S. hosting matches from 2006 to 2010.

The U.S. men's national rugby sevens team has regularly participated in the World Rugby Sevens Series since the tournament's founding in 1999. The women's national sevens team has participated in the World Rugby Women's Sevens Series since the competition's launch in 2012. Rugby in the U.S. received a significant boost in 2009 when the International Olympic Committee voted to reinstate rugby into the Summer Olympics beginning in 2016.

In 2014, the United States hosted the New Zealand national team before a record sellout crowd of 61,500 at Soldier Field in Chicago, a match later billed as potentially marking the rise of American rugby. In 2016, PRO Rugby established the first fully professional Rugby competition in the U.S. Also in that year, the English top-flight club London Irish took a home match against Saracens to the Red Bull Arena in the New York area, marking the first top-flight English match ever held outside that country.

== Professional era 2016– ==
During the 1990s, rugby union became officially professional on a global level. In early November 2015, a new professional rugby organization, named PRO Rugby, launched its Facebook page and scheduled an announcement for November 9, 2015. On November 9, 2015, PRO Rugby made an official announcement outlining its plans and a framework for the competition. USA Rugby affirmed that it sanctioned and supported the PRO Rugby competition. Despite a 2016 PRO Rugby season being held, issues occurred during the offseason, and a second season never occurred.

PRO Rugby folded the San Francisco Rush in December 2016, citing a lack of a suitable venue, and on lack of support from the local media. All PRO Rugby players then received notice on December 20, 2016, that their contracts would be terminated in 30 days if progress was not made towards resolving disputes between the league and USA Rugby. As of 2018, numerous players still report to have not been paid the salaries specified in their contracts with PRO Rugby. To recover some of their lost income, some players have elected to file claims with their local labor commissioner offices. No other official announcements were made. By the end of 2017, no representative for PRO Rugby had shown up in any of the court cases in regards to the expenses owed to former director Lewis and others from the operation on the lone Pro Rugby season.

Meanwhile, organization of what would become Major League Rugby began in September 2016. At least five amateur rugby union clubs across the United States began discussing a possible professional league, as Dean Howes, who had previously been an executive with Major League Soccer's Real Salt Lake and the St. Louis Blues of the National Hockey League, stepped in as senior strategic advisor for Rugby Utah in an attempt to provide a pathway for expanding professional rugby stateside.

With PRO Rugby on its way to folding, by February 2017, a total of nine amateur rugby union organizations including the Austin Huns, Dallas Griffins, Glendale Raptors, Houston Strikers, Kansas City Blues, Minneapolis, New Orleans RFC, Rugby Utah and the Seattle Saracens, had announced their intentions to form a professional league to begin play the following year.

On November 6, 2017, Major League Rugby and CBS Sports Network announced a multi-year television partnership which marked MLR's first major television deal for broadcast rights. It was the first time in American history that a new sporting league had a national television deal prior to launch.

The first regular season game in Major League Rugby history was held on April 21, 2018, when the Houston SaberCats hosted the New Orleans Gold in Houston. The Toronto Arrows joined the league ahead of 2019 season as the first Canadian team in MLR. Three further American clubs began play in 2020.

== See also ==
- History of rugby union
