= Yale Rugby =

US rugby union club, based in New Haven, CT

(United States) Yale Rugby
- Full name: Yale Bulldogs Rugby Team
- Union: Ivy League
- Nickname: Bulldogs
- Founded: 1875; 151 years ago
- Location: New Haven, Connecticut
- Ground: Upper Athletic Fields 41.313°N 72.968°W
- President: Levi Cervantez
- Coach: Craig Wilson
- Captain: Diego Valacco
- League: Ivy Rugby Conference
Team kit

Official website
- www.yalerugby.com

The Yale Bulldogs Rugby Team, or simply, Yale Rugby is the rugby union team of the Yale University. Yale has fielded a team that has played using the rugby rules since at least 1875. The school competes in the Ivy Rugby Conference and in Division I-AA of USA Rugby's intercollegiate competition. The YRFC plays a fall and spring schedule, which includes both a 15s and a 7s program. The team has approximately 45 players and is coached by Head Coach, Craig Wilson and Assistant Coaches Brad Dufek, Alycia Washington and Greg McWilliams.

== Teams' histories ==
=== Men's team history ===
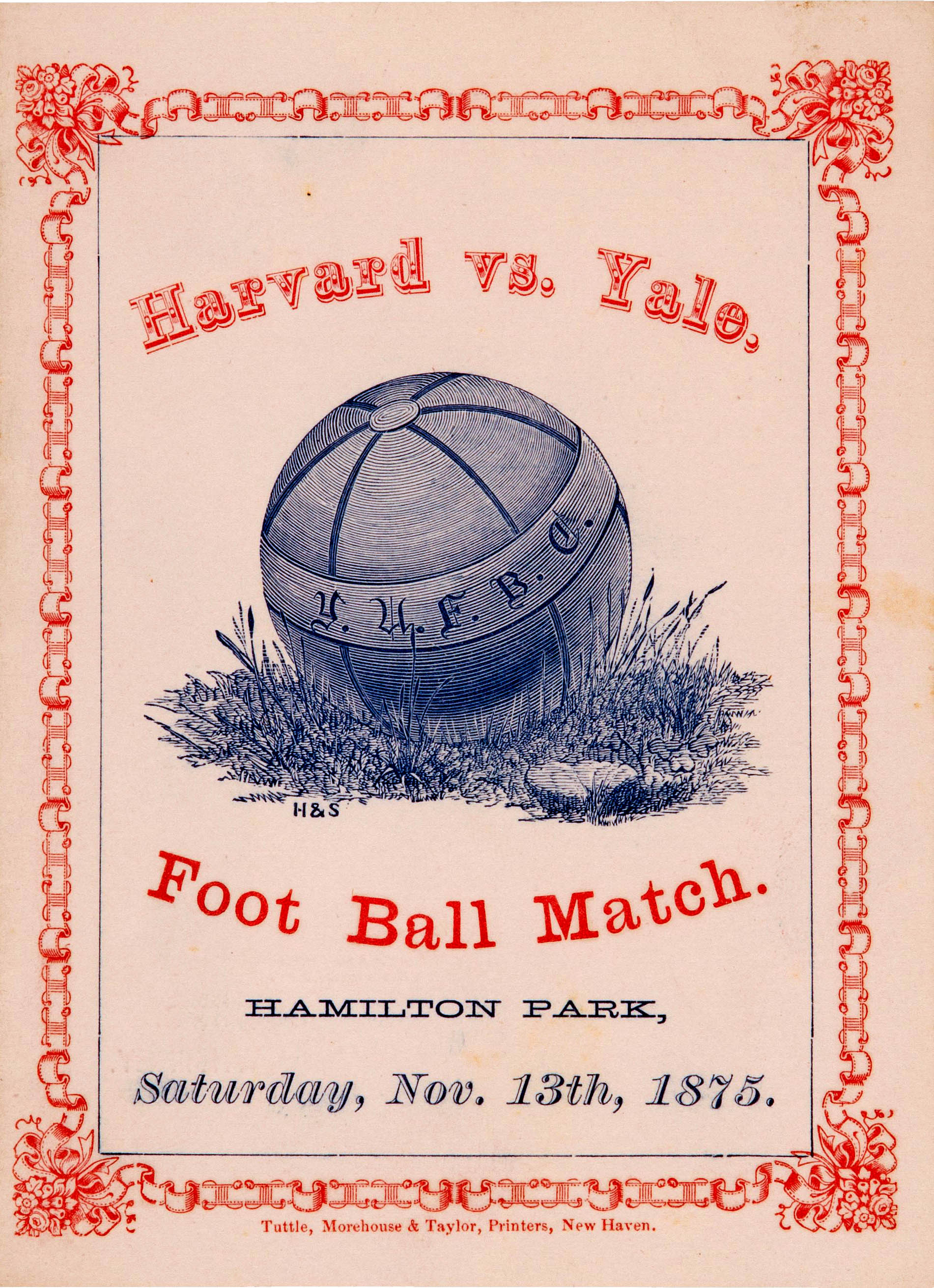
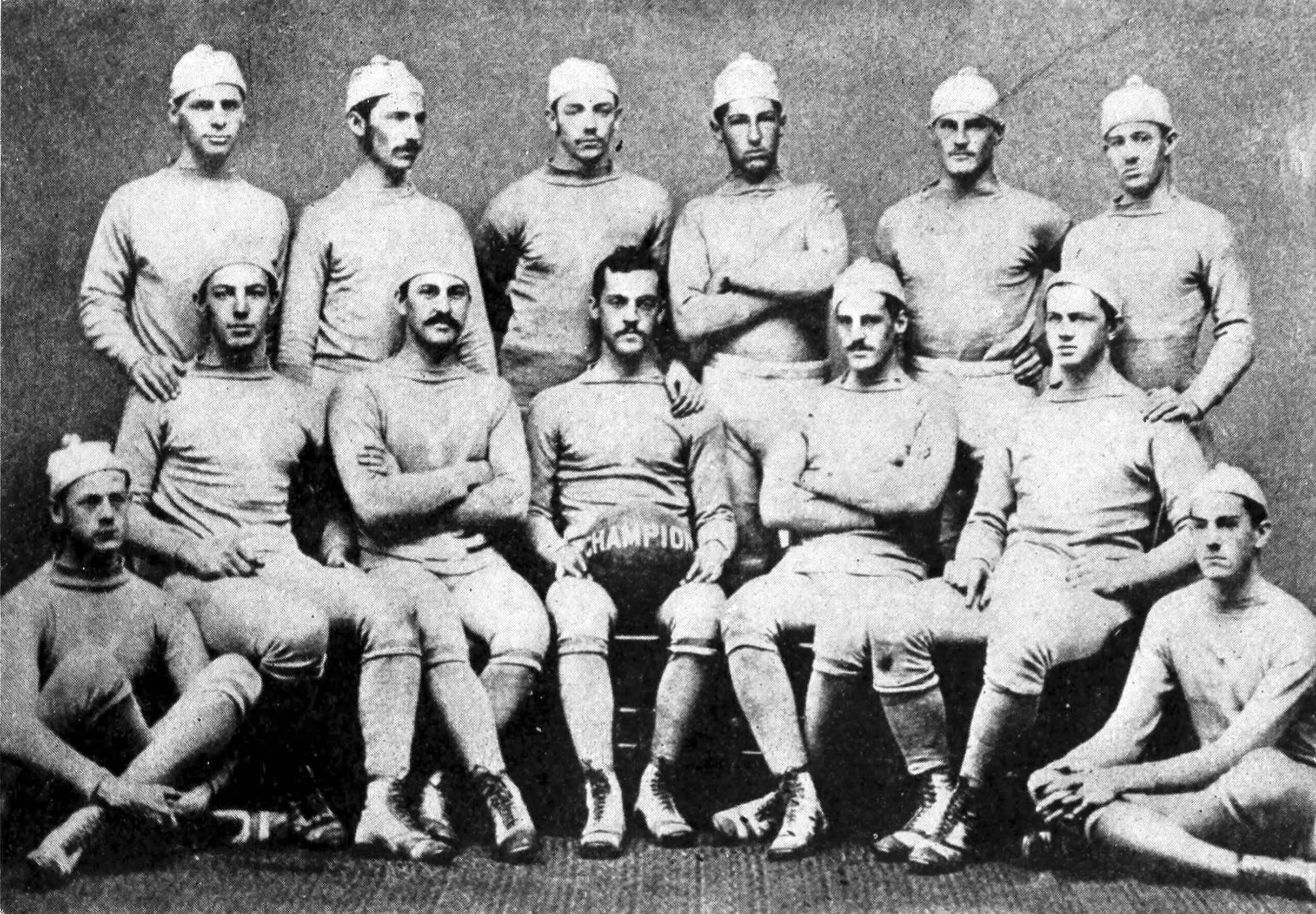
(Left): Harvard vs Yale program from 1875 "Foot Ball Match", the first intercollegiate game between the teams playing a game closer to rugby (as 15 players per side) and soccer (as ball was circular) at Hamilton Park in New Haven, Connecticut;
(right): First Yale team to play the rugby game, 1876. Back Row.—Clark, C. Camp, Hatch, W. Camp, Wurts, Taylor.Front Row.—Davis, Downer, Walker, Baker, Bigelow, Thompson, Morse

Yale Rugby was founded in 1875, making it one of the oldest rugby teams in North America. The date refers to the first Harvard vs Yale contest held in 1875, two years after the inaugural Princeton–Yale football contest. Harvard athlete Nathaniel Curtis challenged Yale's captain, William Arnold to a rugby-style game. The next season Curtis was captain. He took one look at Walter Camp, then only 156 pounds, and told Yale captain Gene Baker "You don't mean to let that child play, do you? . . . He will get hurt."

The two teams agreed to play under a set of rules called the "Concessionary Rules", which involved Harvard conceding something to Yale's soccer and Yale conceding a great deal to Harvard's rugby. The game featured a round ball instead of a rugby-style oblong ball, and caused Yale to drop association football in favor of rugby.

Though it was not a founding member of the Intercollegiate Football Association ("IFA"), which agreed on November 23, 1876 to play using the rugby union code, Yale often played per those rules as its competition agreed to use the rugby union code rules. Yale played on November 30, 1876, the very first Thanksgiving game using the rugby union code. This game was played against Princeton exactly one week after Princeton agreed to play abiding by IFA rugby union code.

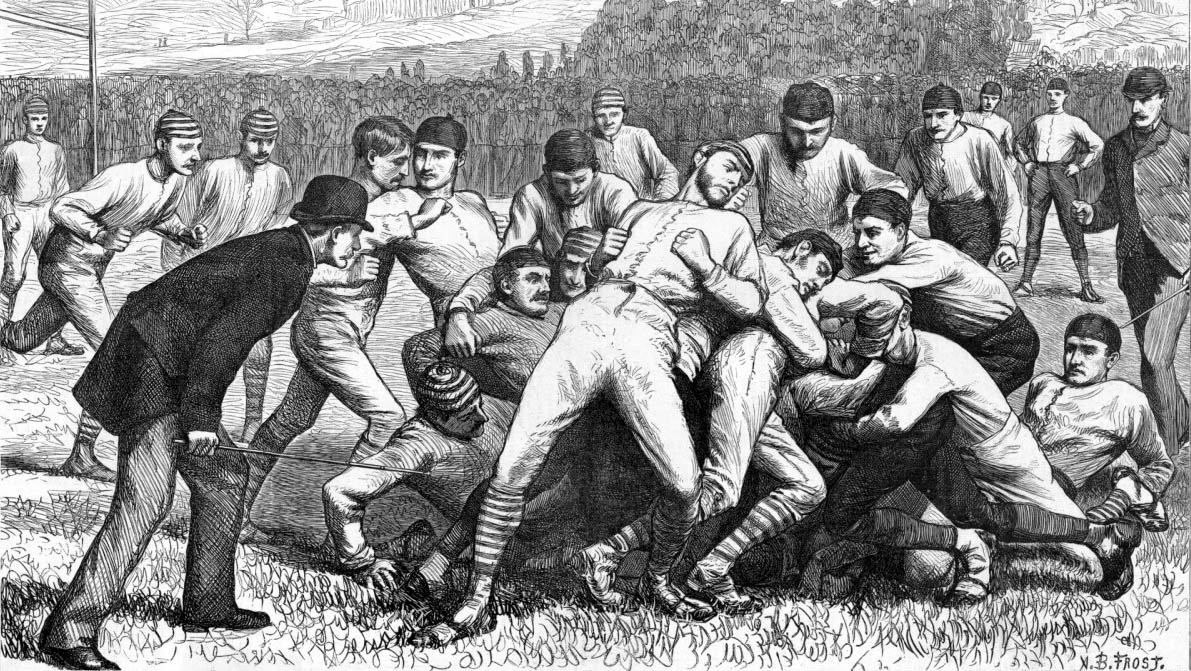
Wood engraving by Arthur Burdett Frost that appeared in Harper's Weekly depicting the 1879 Yale versus Princeton game, played under the rules of rugby (as there was no scrimmage line and forward passes were not allowed)

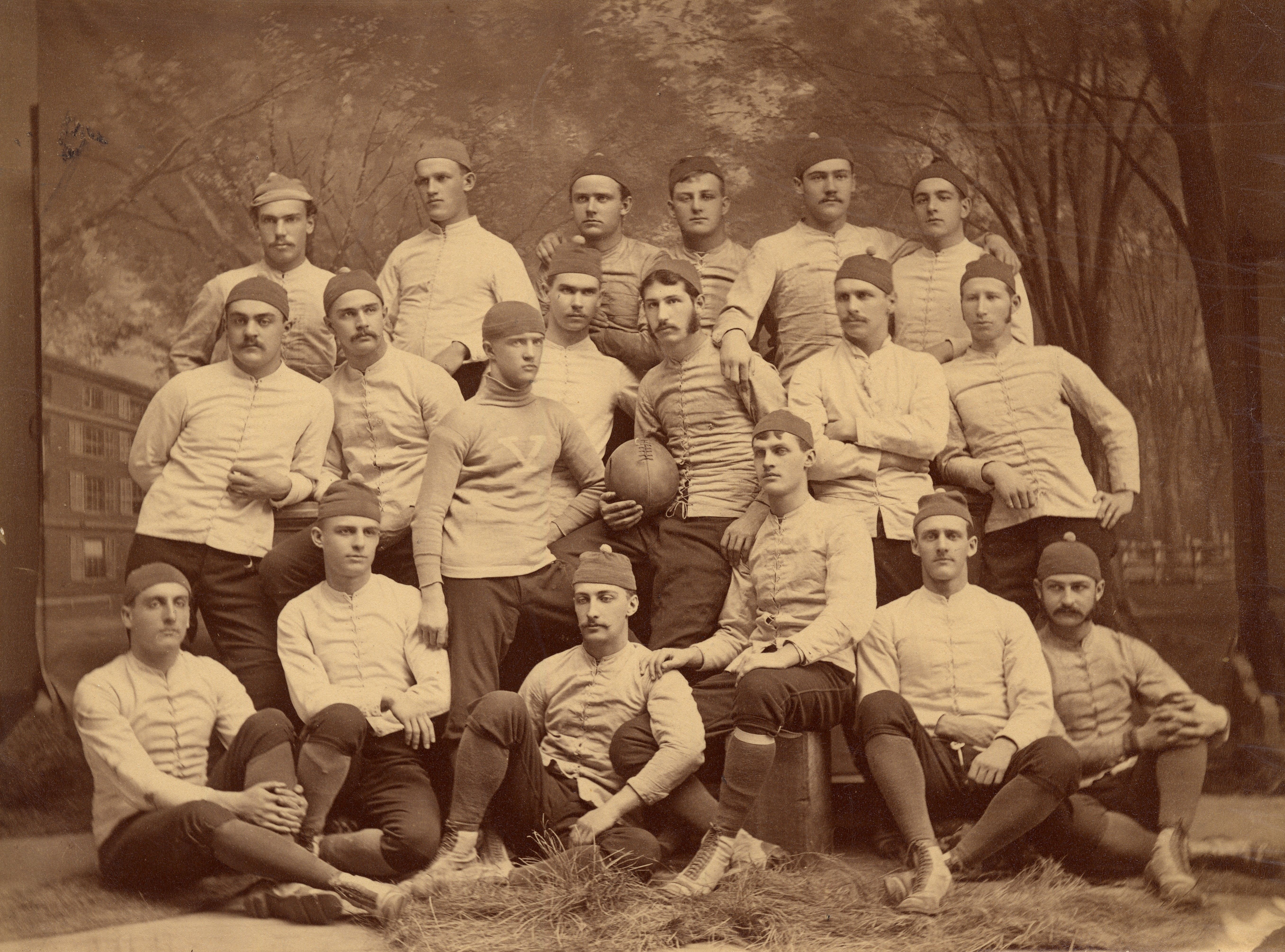
Photo of Yale's 1879 team playing game using rugby union rules

By 1879 Yale had joined peer schools Princeton Rugby and Harvard Rugby to be a member of IFA and play all its games per rugby union code (as slightly modified from time to time by IFA).

By 1893, forty thousand (40,000) spectators showed up to watch Yale play Princeton on Thanksgiving in New York's Manhattan Field. The game Yale and Princeton played on Thanksgiving of 1893 was much closer to rugby than American football as there were no forward passes (as such rule was not established for another dozen or so years when Walter Camp, a Yale Alumnus and rugby player, worked with University of Pennsylvania alumnus and rugby player John Heisman to change the rules of 19th century college rugby to create American Football).

Yale Rugby's Walter Camp was leader of a handful of former rugby players to change the rules in last decade of 19th Century and first decade of 20th Century to add additional rule innovations like the snap and downs, which had begun to distinguish the American game from rugby.

Yale Rugby, along with the Harvard and Princeton Rugby teams, began the tradition of U.S. college students going on Spring Break athletic tours in the Caribbean.

=== Women's team history ===
The Yale Women's Rugby Football Club was founded in 1978. Yale head coach Craig Wilson began as the coach of Yale's women's squad and assistant to the Men's team before taking on the head coach role of both teams in fall 2019.

== Cups and competitions ==
=== Ivy League regular season ===
The first Ivy League Rugby Tournament Championship was played in 1969. In 2009, the men joined a newly established Ivy Rugby Conference that was formed to foster better competition among rugby teams from the Ivy League schools and to raise the quality of play. Ivy Rugby formed committees to manage the league independently of the Territorial Area Unions. The Ivy Rugby Conference, and specifically its sevens tournament, has enabled the Ivy schools to tap into existing rivalries and fan bases. The women began a full season of Ivy League play in the fall of 2011.

=== The Koranda Cup ===
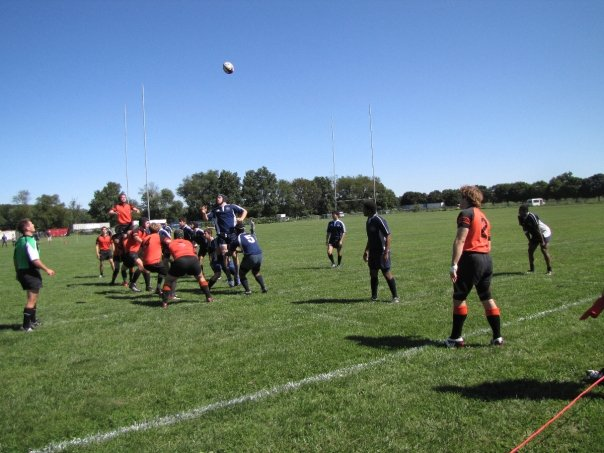
Yale v long-time rival Princeton game in 2010

The Yale vs. Princeton rugby rivalry has strong historic roots dating back to the 1870s. In 2002, after many years of not playing Yale regularly, Princeton decided to re-establish the tradition and challenge Yale to an annual match each spring. The following year, Yale graciously accepted Princeton's request to make the match special for both teams by creating a trophy in memory of Rob Koranda. Rob died in a Chicago porch collapse in June 2003, a tragedy that claimed 12 other young lives. The 2019 cup currently sits in New Haven and will be challenged again in spring 2020.

=== Las Vegas 7's Invitational ===
The Yale team competes annually in the Las Vegas 7's tournament.

== Titles ==
- Ivy Rugby Championship (2): 1970, 1978

== Notable alumni ==
- George W. Bush – 43rd President of the United States
- Bill Clinton – 42nd President of the United States
- Karl Marlantes – American documentary film cinematographer, director, and producer
- Mark R. Nemec - 9th President of Fairfield University
- Walter Camp - Inventor of American Football
