= Paul G. Haaga Jr. =

Paul G. Haaga, Jr.

Personal details
- Children: 2
- Education: Princeton University (BA); University of Pennsylvania (MBA, JD)

Paul G. Haaga, Jr. is an American businessman who was the acting CEO of NPR from 2013 to 2014, a former director of Capital Research and Management Company, chairman of the Facebook Oversight Board, board of trustees president of the Natural History Museum of Los Angeles County and namesake of the Magnapaulia dinosaur.

== Education ==
Haaga earned a Bachelor of Arts degree in economics from Princeton University, an M.B.A. from the Wharton School of the University of Pennsylvania, and a Juris Doctor from the University of Pennsylvania Law School.

== Career ==
Haaga worked as senior attorney for the division of investment management of the U.S. Securities and Exchange Commission from 1974 to 1977 before joining international law firm Dechert, where he was a partner at the Washington, D.C. office. He joined Capital in 1985.

While at Capital Group, Haaga served as chairman of the board of governors of the Investment Company Institute, the trade association for the mutual fund industry. He is credited with helping to restore the industry's reputation after the market timing scandal of 2003.

He has also served as president of the board of trustees of the Los Angeles County Museum of Natural History, director of NPR, chairman of the board of overseers of the University of Pennsylvania Law School, president and major gifts chair for Princeton's class of 1970, and a trustee of the Princeton Rugby endowment. He has also taught a course on mutual fund regulation at Stanford Law School.

On September 13, 2013, Haaga was appointed acting CEO of National Public Radio (NPR).

On July 1, 2014, Haaga was named to the Trustees of Princeton University to serve an eight-year term as a charter trustee.
