= Victoria Chun =

American athletic director (born 1969)

Current position
- Title: Athletic director
- Team: Yale
- Conference: Ivy League

Biographical details
- Born: January 1, 1969 (age 57); Santa Monica, California, U.S.
- Education: Colgate University

Playing career
- 1987–1990: Colgate

Coaching career (HC unless noted)
- 1993: Colgate (assistant)
- 1994–1996: Colgate

Administrative career (AD unless noted)
- 2007–2012: Colgate (associate AD)
- 2012–2018: Colgate
- 2018–present: Yale

Head coaching record
- Overall: 67–27

Victoria Chun (born January 1, 1969) is the current director of athletics for Yale University, serving in that role since 2018.

== Biography ==
=== Education ===
Chun attended college at Colgate University, where she played on the Colgate Raiders women's volleyball team. There she earned Patriot League Player of the Year honors.

She graduated with a Bachelor of Arts in political science and education in 1991 and earned a Master of Arts in history from Colgate in 1994.

=== Early career ===
Chun began her career in university athletics as assistant volleyball coach at her alma mater, Colgate University in 1993. She was promoted to head women's volleyball head coach at Colgate University the following year and served in that role until 1996.

From 1997 to 2000 she completed an administrative internship at the NCAA national office. From 2001 to 2005, she was the commissioner of the New York State Women's Collegiate Athletic Association.

=== Colgate University ===
Chun returned to Colgate as an assistant athletic director in 2005 and served as associate athletic director at Colgate University from 2007 to 2012.

From 2012 to 2018, she served as athletic director for Colgate University.

=== Yale University ===
Chun was named athletic director at Yale University on February 1, 2018. She is the first woman to hold the position.

In July 2026, her contract as athletic director was renewed until June 2031.

== Head coaching record ==
Record table
Season	Team	Overall	Conference	Standing	Postseason
Colgate Raiders (Patriot League) (1994–1996)
1994	Colgate	21–11			
1995	Colgate	19–9			
1996	Colgate	27–7			
Colgate:		67–27			
Total:		67–27			
