= Ivy Rugby Conference =

American rugby union conference

- Sport: Rugby union
- Founded: 2009; 17 years ago
- First season: 2009
- No. of teams: 8
- Country: United States
- Most recent champions: 15s: Brown (2026); 7s: Brown (2026)
- Most titles: 15s: Dartmouth (24 titles); 7s: Dartmouth (9)
- Broadcaster: ESPN+
- Website: ivyrugby.com

The Ivy Rugby Conference was a rugby union conference consisting of the eight member schools of the Ivy League. As of the 2022 season the teams now compete in the Liberty Rugby conference, but an Ivy League champion will continue to be awarded. The Ivy conference was formed in 2009 to foster better competition among rugby teams from the Ivy League schools and to raise the quality of play. Ivy Rugby formed committees to manage the league, independently of the LAUs and TUs. The conference took over the organization of the Ivy rugby championships that had been contested since 1969.

The Ivy Rugby Conference, and specifically its sevens tournament, has enabled the Ivy schools to tap into existing rivalries and fan bases.

Ivy Rugby has had some past success in attracting commercial sponsors. Sponsors have included H2H, Royall Lyme and Boathouse Sports.

The Ivy League schools have a rich rugby tradition that pre-dates the formation of the Ivy conference. Teams in the Ivy League have played rugby games against each other since the mid-1870s and starting in 2024 will be celebrating the 150th anniversary of such rugby games.

The eight Ivy League schools competed in the Ivy Rugby Championship Tournament from 1969 until the Ivy Rugby Conference was formed in 2009. The Ivy Rugby logo was developed in 2005.

In addition to the traditional 15-a-side rugby union competition, the teams play yearly for the Ivy Rugby 7s Championship.

== Members ==
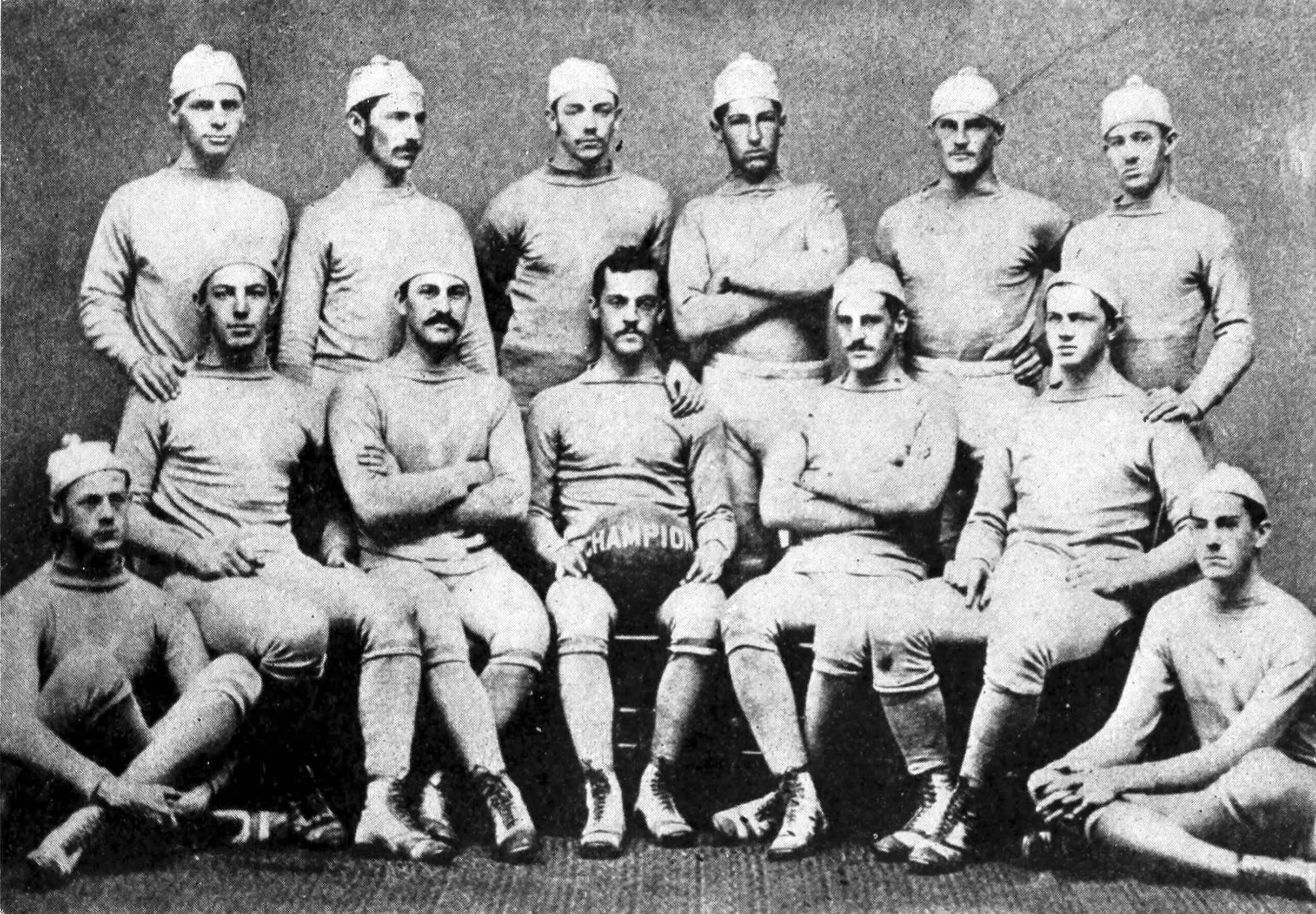
Photo of the first Yale team to play using rules of rugby union (1876); Back row: Clark, C. Camp, Hatch, Walter Camp, Wurts, Taylor; front row: Davis, Downer, Walker, Baker, Bigelow, Thompson, Morse

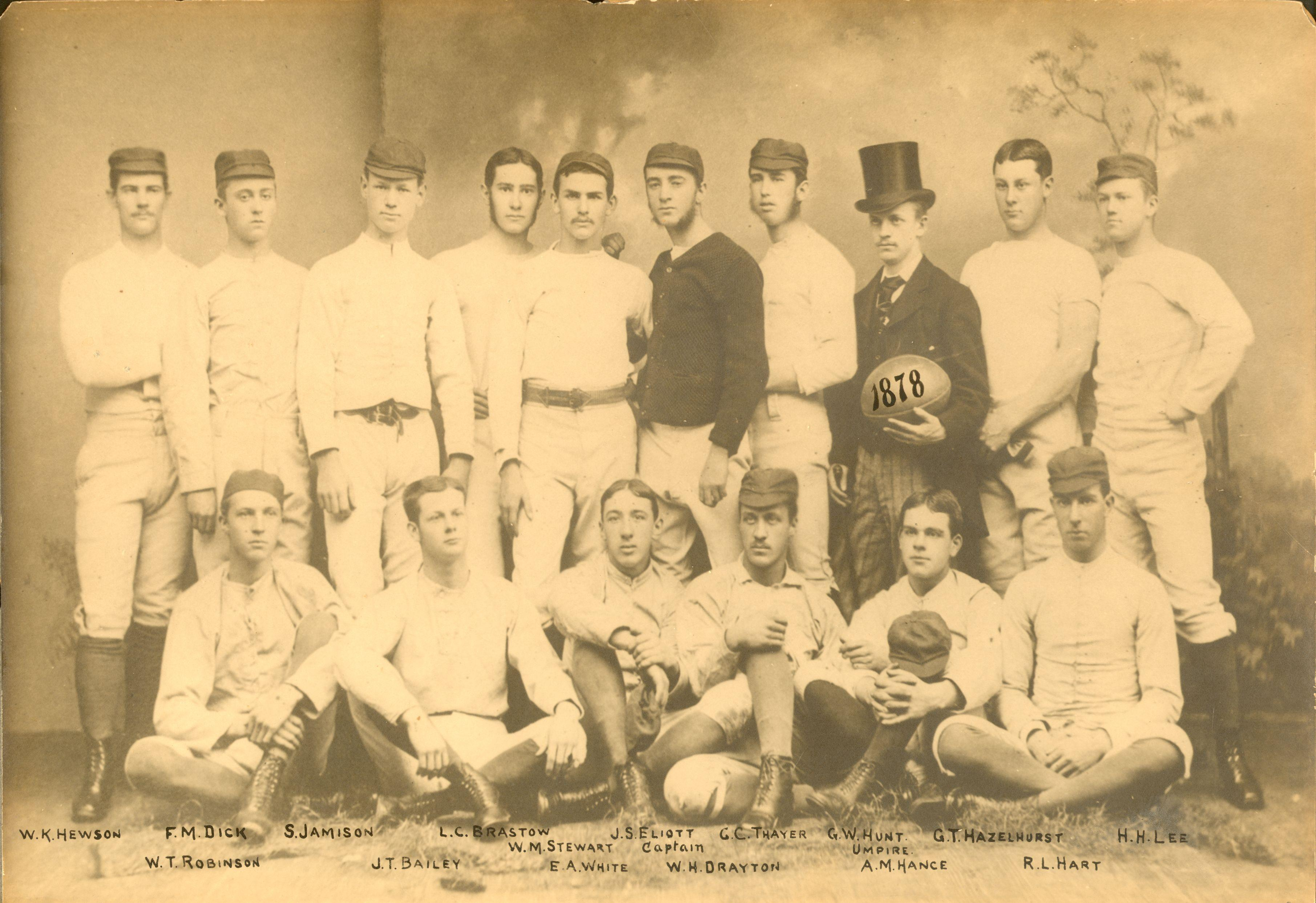
Penn's 1878 team with 15 players and a coach played using Rugby Union football rules

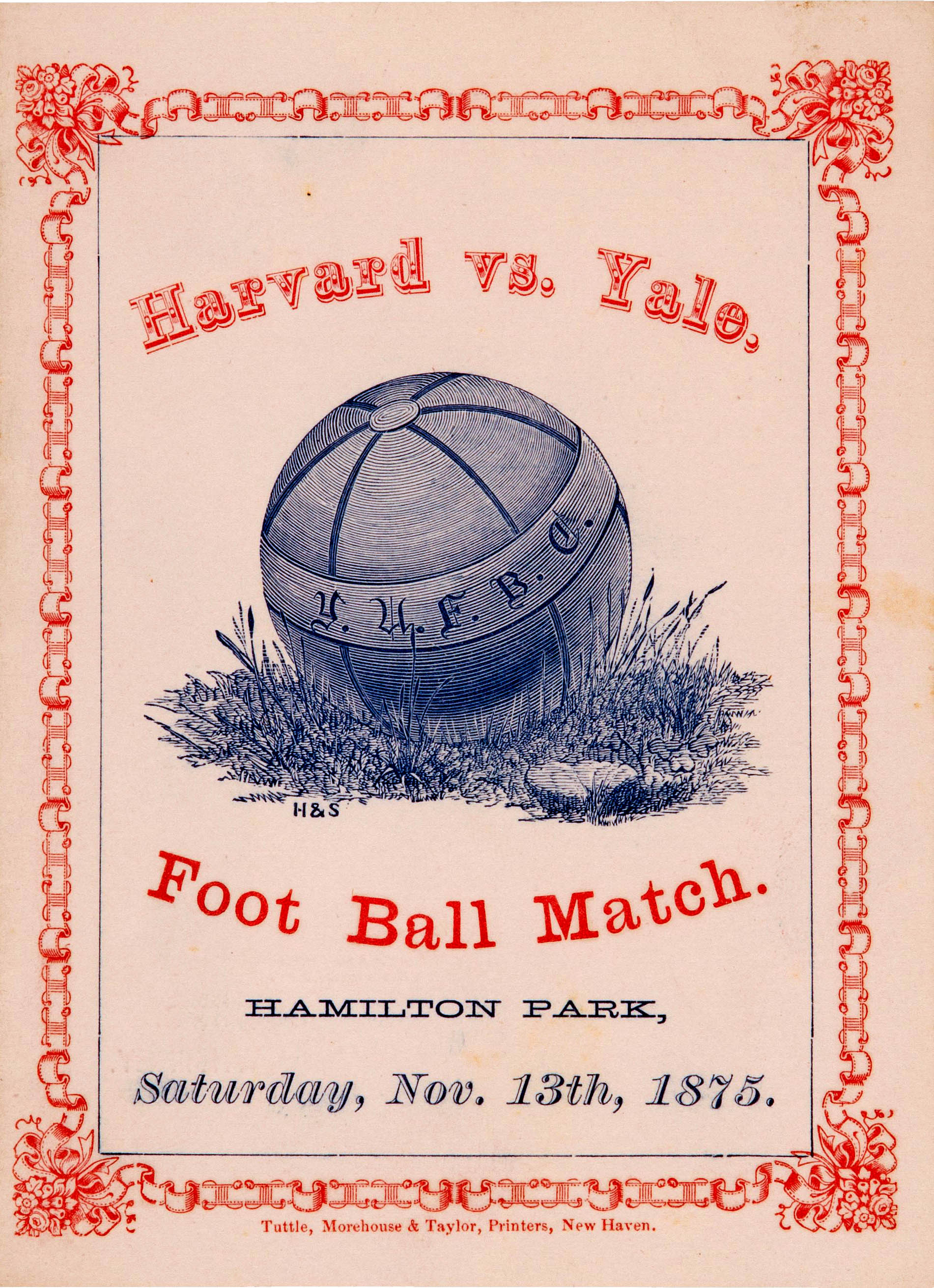
Program for the "Football match", Harvard vs Yale, the first intercollegiate game. It is considered the first rugby game between Ivy League teams. The game was played at Hamilton Field in New Haven, Connecticut.

Institution	Location	Team Nickname	Undergraduate enrollment	Graduate enrollment
Brown	Providence, Rhode Island	Bears	6,316	2,333
Columbia	New York City, New York	Lions	7,160	15,760
Cornell	Ithaca, New York	Big Red	13,931	6,702
Dartmouth	Hanover, New Hampshire	Big Green	4,248	1,893
Harvard	Cambridge, Massachusetts	Crimson	7,181	14,044
Princeton	Princeton, New Jersey	Tigers	5,113	2,479
Pennsylvania	Philadelphia, Pennsylvania	Quakers	10,337	10,306
Yale	New Haven, Connecticut	Bulldogs	5,275	6,391

== Roll of Honor ==
County	Title(s)	Runners-Up	Years won	Years runners-up
Dartmouth	24	12	1972, 1977, 1990, 1993, 1998, 1999, 2000, 2001, 2002, 2005, 2006, 2008, 2009 (Spring) , 2009 (Fall), 2010, 2011, 2012, 2013, 2014 (Spring) , 2014 (Fall), 2015, 2016, 2017, 2018, 2019	1976, 1984, 1992, 1995, 1996, 2007, 2021, 2022, 2023, 2024, 2025, 2026
Brown	17	9	1974, 1975, 1976, 1980, 1983, 1985, 1986, 1987, 1988, 1995, 1996, 2021, 2022, 2023, 2024, 2025, 2026	1969, 1971, 1973, 1979, 1989, 2013, 2014 (Fall), 2018, 2019
Harvard	8	12	1981, 1982, 1984, 1989, 1991, 1994, 2003, 2007	1970, 1983, 1985, 1986, 2006, 2008, 2009 (Spring), 2010, 2011, 2014 (Spring), 2015, 2017
Princeton	5	6	1969, 1971, 1973, 1979, 2004	1975, 1978, 1998, 1999, 2000, 2001
Yale	2	4	1970, 1978	1977, 1982, 2003, 2009 (Fall)
Penn	1	1	1992	2016
Cornell	0	3		2002, 2004, 2005

== Championship results ==
Historic results of the Ivy Rugby Championship, organised by the Ivy Rugby Conference since 2009:

Ivy Rugby Championship
Ed.	Year	Champion	Score	Runner Up	Ref.
1	1969	Princeton (1)	6–3	Brown	
2	1970	Yale (1)	?	Harvard	
3	1971	Princeton (2)	?	Brown	
4	1972	Dartmouth (1)	?	?	
5	1973	Princeton (3)	32–6	Brown	
6	1974	Brown (1)	?	?	
7	1975	Brown (2)	?	Princeton	
8	1976	Brown (3)	24–13	Dartmouth	
9	1977	Dartmouth (2)	18–6	Yale	
10	1978	Yale (2)	10–3?	Princeton	
11	1979	Princeton (4)	10–6?	Brown	
12	1980	Brown (4)	?	?	
13	1981	Harvard (1)	?	?	
14	1982	Harvard (2)	33–12	Yale	
15	1983	Brown (5)	21–6	Harvard	
16	1984	Harvard (3)	11–3	Dartmouth	
17	1985	Brown (6)	?	Harvard	
18	1986	Brown (7)	13–4	Harvard	
19	1987	Brown (8)	?	?	
20	1988	Brown (9)	?	?	
21	1989	Harvard (4)	12–9	Brown	
22	1990	Dartmouth (3)	?	Columbia	
23	1991	Harvard (5)	?	?	
24	1992	Penn (1)	?	Dartmouth	
25	1993	Dartmouth (4)	–		
26	1994	Harvard (6)	?	?	
27	1995	Brown (10)	?	Dartmouth	
28	1996	Brown (11)	?	Dartmouth	
–	1997	(not held due to snow)			
29	1998	Dartmouth (5)	22–21	Princeton	
30	1999	Dartmouth (6)	39–17	Princeton	
31	2000	Dartmouth (7)	?	Princeton	
32	2001	Dartmouth (8)	?	Princeton	
33	2002	Dartmouth (9)	35–17	Cornell	
34	2003	Harvard (7)	22–7	Yale	
35	2004	Princeton (5)	25–5	Cornell	
36	2005	Dartmouth (10)	21–7	Cornell	
37	2006	Dartmouth (11)	52–16	Harvard	
38	2007	Harvard (8)	28–25 (a.e.t.)	Dartmouth	
39	2008	Dartmouth (12)	41–0	Harvard	
40	2009 (Spring)	Dartmouth (13)	62–13	Harvard	
41	2009 (Fall)	Dartmouth (14)	53–6	Yale	
42	2010	Dartmouth (15)	31–0	Harvard	
43	2011	Dartmouth (16)	62–0	Harvard	
44	2013*	Dartmouth (17)	32–3	Brown	
45	2014 (Spring)	Dartmouth (18)	52–3	Harvard	
46	2014 (Fall)	Dartmouth (19)	90–7	Brown	
47	2015	Dartmouth (20)	51–19	Harvard	
48	2016	Dartmouth (21)	105–0	Penn	
49	2017	Dartmouth (22)	43–22	Harvard	
50	2018	Dartmouth (23)	37–7	Brown	
51	2019	Dartmouth (24)	18–12	Brown	
–	2020	(not held due to COVID-19 pandemic)			
52	2021	Brown (12)	15–13	Dartmouth	
53	2022	Brown (13)	24–5	Dartmouth	
54	2023	Brown (14)	38–15	Dartmouth	
55	2024	Brown (15)	40–14	Dartmouth	
56	2025	Brown (16)	25–21	Dartmouth	
57	2026	Brown (17)	52–7	Dartmouth	
*2012 regular season played in the Fall and final played in Spring 2013

== 7s championship results ==
Year	Champion	Score	Runner Up	MVP	Ref.
Spring 2011	Brown	19–10	Columbia	Daniel Levine-Spound	
Fall 2011	Dartmouth	40–14	Harvard		
2012	Dartmouth	15–5	Penn		
2013	Dartmouth*			Will Chockley	
2014	Dartmouth	46–0	Yale		
2015	Dartmouth		??		
2016	Dartmouth*				
2017	Dartmouth		??		
2018	Brown	22–0	Dartmouth		
2019	Dartmouth	17–12	Harvard		
2020–2021	Not held due to COVID-19 pandemic				
2022	Brown	12–10	Dartmouth		
2023	Dartmouth	14–7	Brown		
2024	Brown	21–12	Dartmouth		
2025	Brown	19–15	Dartmouth		
2026	Brown	17–0	Dartmouth		
*Dartmouth A and B reached the final and shared title.
