= Harvard rugby =

US rugby union club, based in Cambridge, Massachusetts

(United States) Harvard
- Full name: Harvard Rugby Football Club
- Nickname: Crimson
- Founded: December 6, 1872; 153 years ago
- Location: Cambridge, Massachusetts
- Ground: Mignone Field 42.371°N 71.128°W
- League: Ivy Rugby Conference
Team kit

Official website
- www.harvardmrugby.com

The Harvard Rugby Football Club is the National Collegiate Athletic Association (NCAA) Division I rugby union program that represents Harvard University in the Ivy Rugby Conference. Having been established in December 1872, Harvard has the oldest rugby college program in the United States.

Harvard's first involvement with the sport can be traced to 1874, when Harvard played a two-game series vs Canadian McGill University. As the second game was played under the rules of rugby football, Harvard embraced the game and continued until the establishment of American football rules that introduced concepts such as line of scrimmage or the system of downs.

In past years, the team traveled to Berkeley, California, for the National Tournament (Top 16) after having taken the Ivy League title.

== History ==
Established in December 1872 for former players of defunct Oneida Football Club, "Harvard University Football Club" started to play the "Boston game", an hybrid between association and rugby football established by the Bostoners.

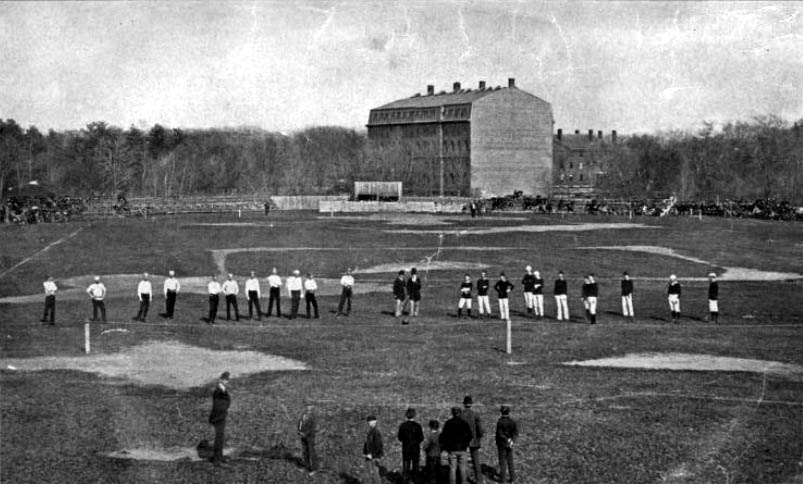
Scene from the second Harvard v McGill game played at Jarvis Field in Cambridge, Massachusetts, on May 15, 1874, under the rugby rules

In 1873 when the Harvard team received an invitation from the McGill University football club. The McGill team was then in a similar situation as Harvard, as they sought some team with which to play rugby football and no other club wanted to play that game. Harvard boys agreed to a rugby match with McGill under the condition the Canadians played the Boston Game.

As McGill accepted, a two-game series was scheduled for May 1874 in Boston. The team captains sent letters detailing their respective game's rules and it was agreed that the first game would be played under Boston rules and the second under rugby rules.

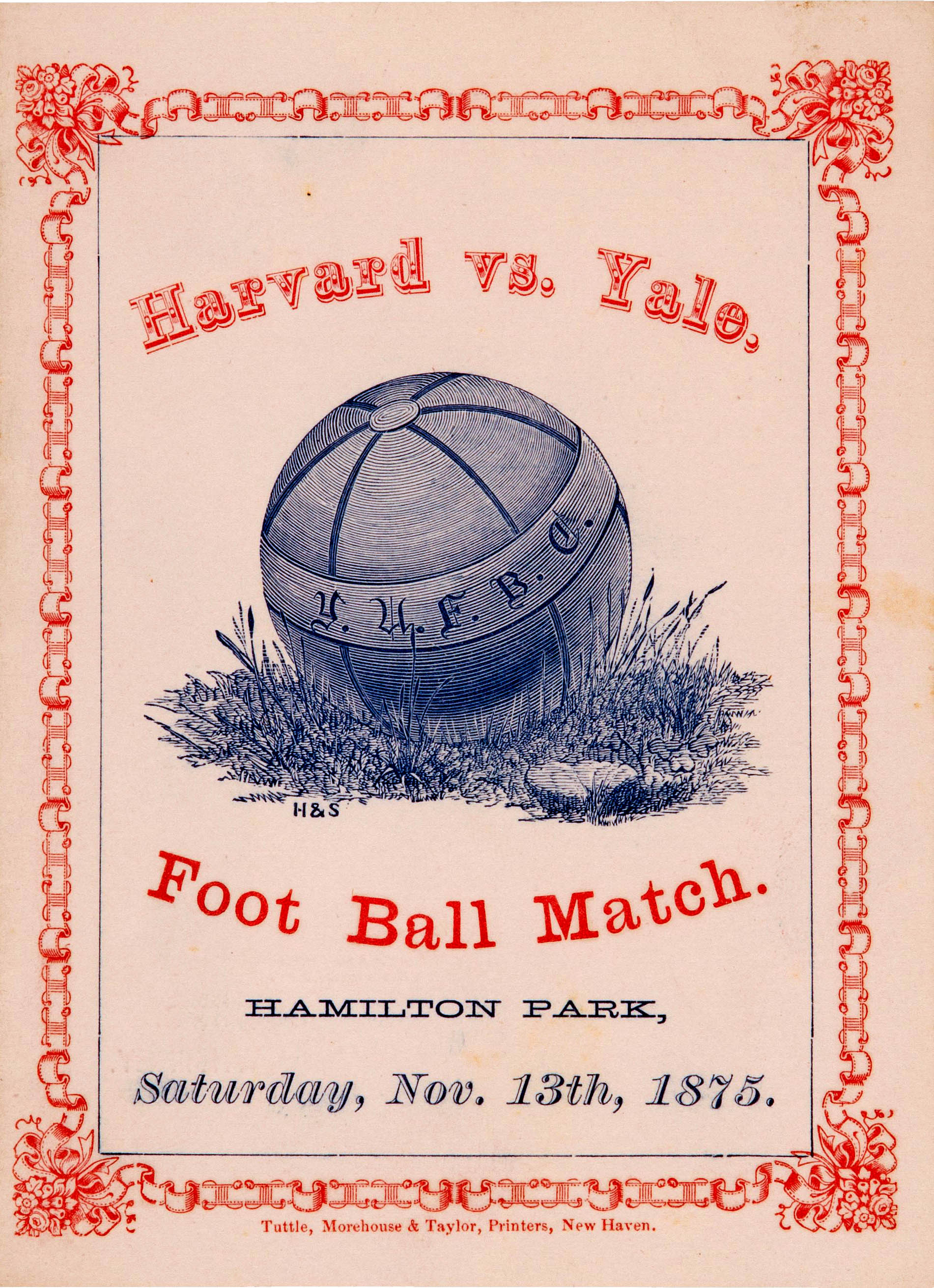
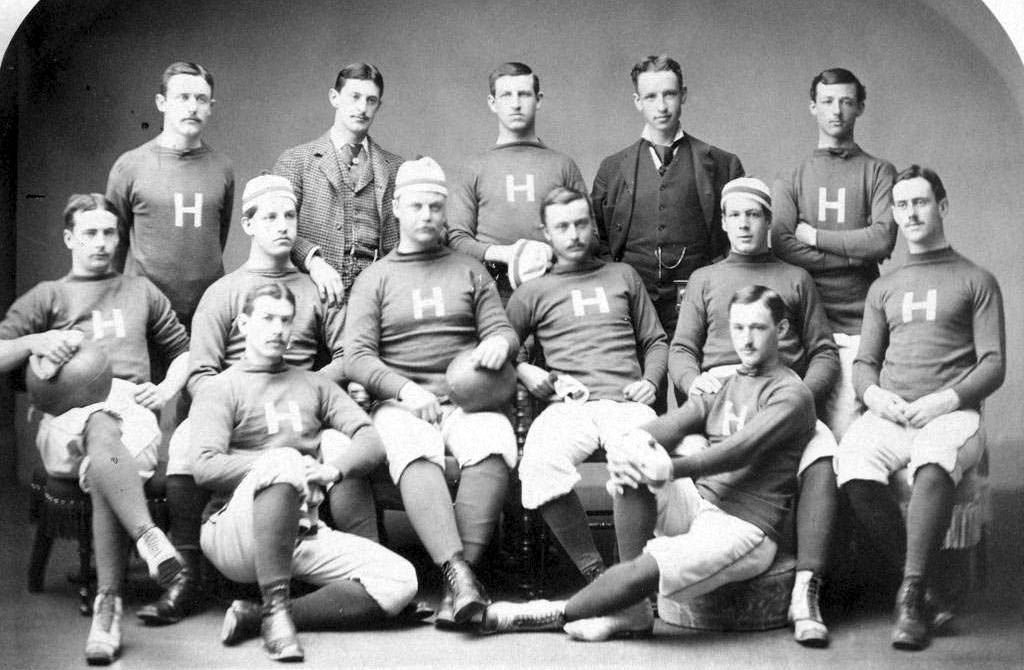
(Left): Harvard vs Yale program from 1875 "Foot Ball Match", the first intercollegiate game between the teams playing a game closer to rugby (as 15 players per side) and soccer (as ball was circular) at Hamilton Park in New Haven, Connecticut;
(right): 1877 Harvard team, which played games following the RFU rules with some variations, as adopted, by representatives from Harvard, Yale, Princeton, and Columbia

The first Harvard vs Yale contest was held in 1875, two years after the inaugural Princeton–Yale football contest. Harvard athlete Nathaniel Curtis challenged Yale's captain, William Arnold to a rugby-style game. The next season Curtis was captain. He took one look at Walter Camp, then only 156 pounds, and told Yale captain Gene Baker "You don't mean to let that child play, do you? . . . He will get hurt."

On 23 November 1876, representatives from Harvard, Yale, Princeton, and Columbia met at the Massasoit Convention in Springfield, Massachusetts, agreeing to adopt most of the Rugby Football Union rules, with some variations, so the "Intercollegiate Football Association" was established.

== Competition ==
Though Harvard NCAA athletic teams compete in the Ivy League, since 2009 Harvard Rugby team has competed in the Ivy Rugby Conference. Predating the formation of Ivy Rugby Conference (where each of the eight men's rugby teams played each other over the course of a semester), each spring, from 1969 through 2004, Brown University rugby team hosted the Ivy League Rugby Tournament Championship at their campus. Harvard has won the Ivy League Tournament Championships in 2007, 2003 and 1994 and were National Champions in 1984, as well as National Championship runner-up to Cal-Berkeley in 1981 and to Air Force in 2003.

In 2009, the men joined a newly established Ivy Rugby Conference that kicked off as a separate collegiate conference that operated as its own union (replacing the need to be part of a 'local area union' or 'territorial union' within the national rugby union organization, USA Rugby, such that Harvard no longer was required to be part of New England Rugby Union except for the use of referees certified by a group related to the New England Rugby Union. The Harvard Men's Team, along with the Princeton and Yale Rugby teams, began the tradition of U.S. college students going on Spring Break to the Caribbean. Recently, the Harvard Rugby Football Club released a film, "Just a Club".

== Harvard Business School ==
The Harvard Business School RFC is a rugby union team based at Harvard Business School in Boston, Massachusetts. Although affiliated with Harvard University, only graduate students compete on this team.

== Facilities ==
Harvard play their home matches on Roberto A. Mignone Field, located at Harvard's Soldiers Field Park.

== Titles ==
- Ivy Rugby Championship (8): 1981, 1982, 1984, 1989, 1991, 1994, 2003, 2007

== Notable alumni ==
- Ted Kennedy
- Joseph P. Kennedy Jr.
- Robert Bacon
- Lucius Littauer
- Kevin Rafferty
- Ryan Santos
- Robert Winsor

== Gallery ==
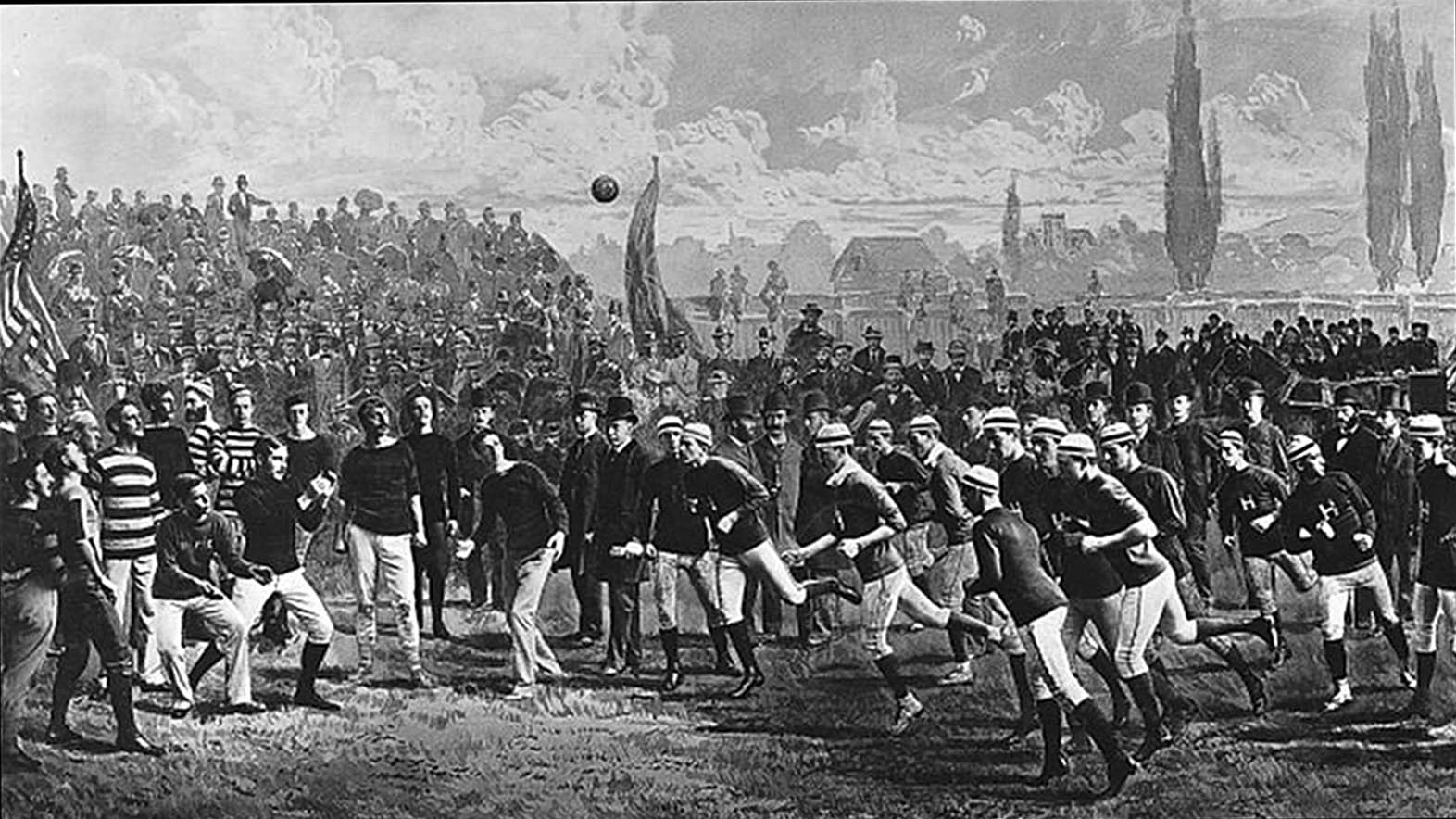
Illustration of one of the Harvard vs McGill games in 1874

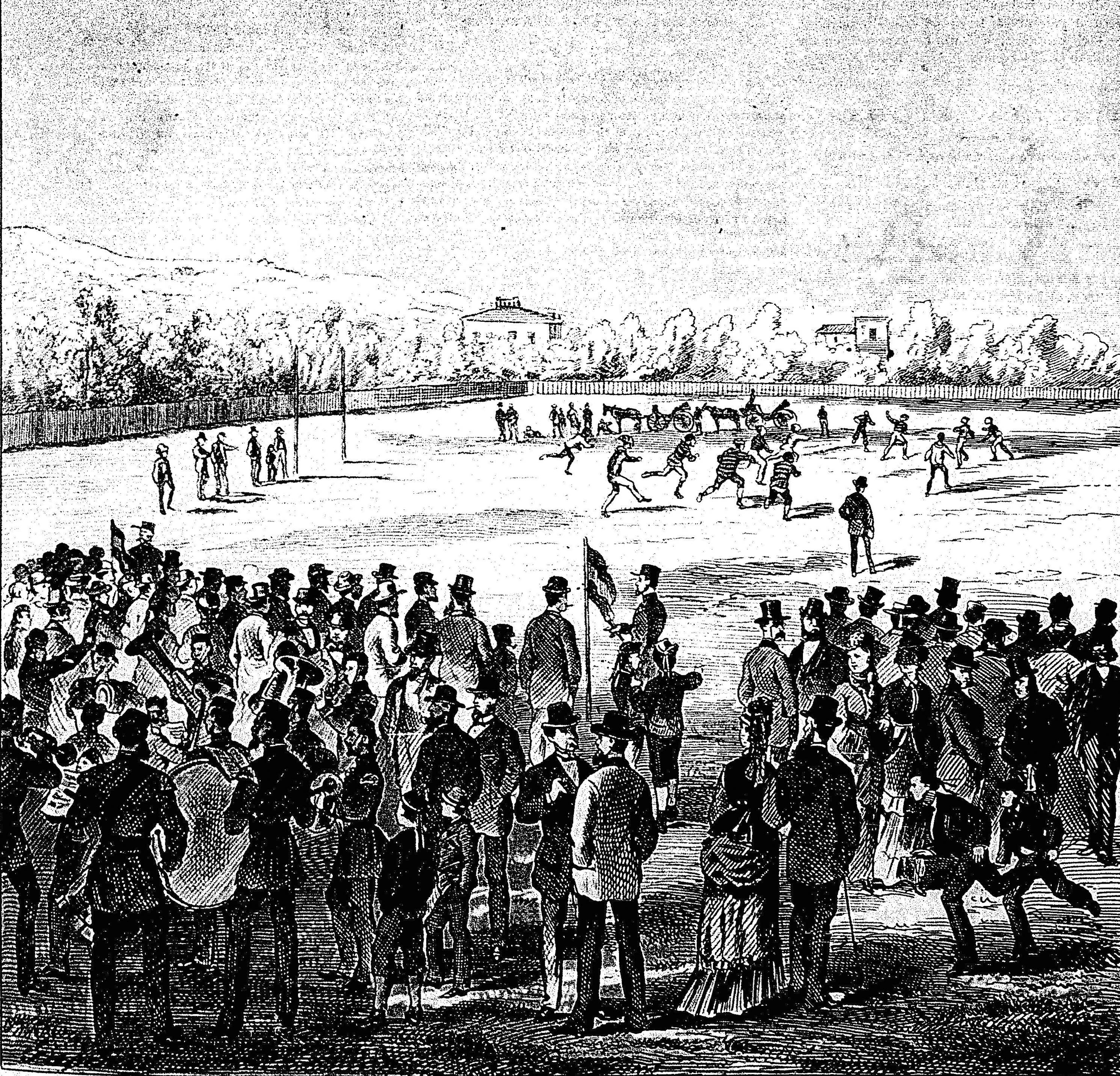
Another illustration of the games vs McGill

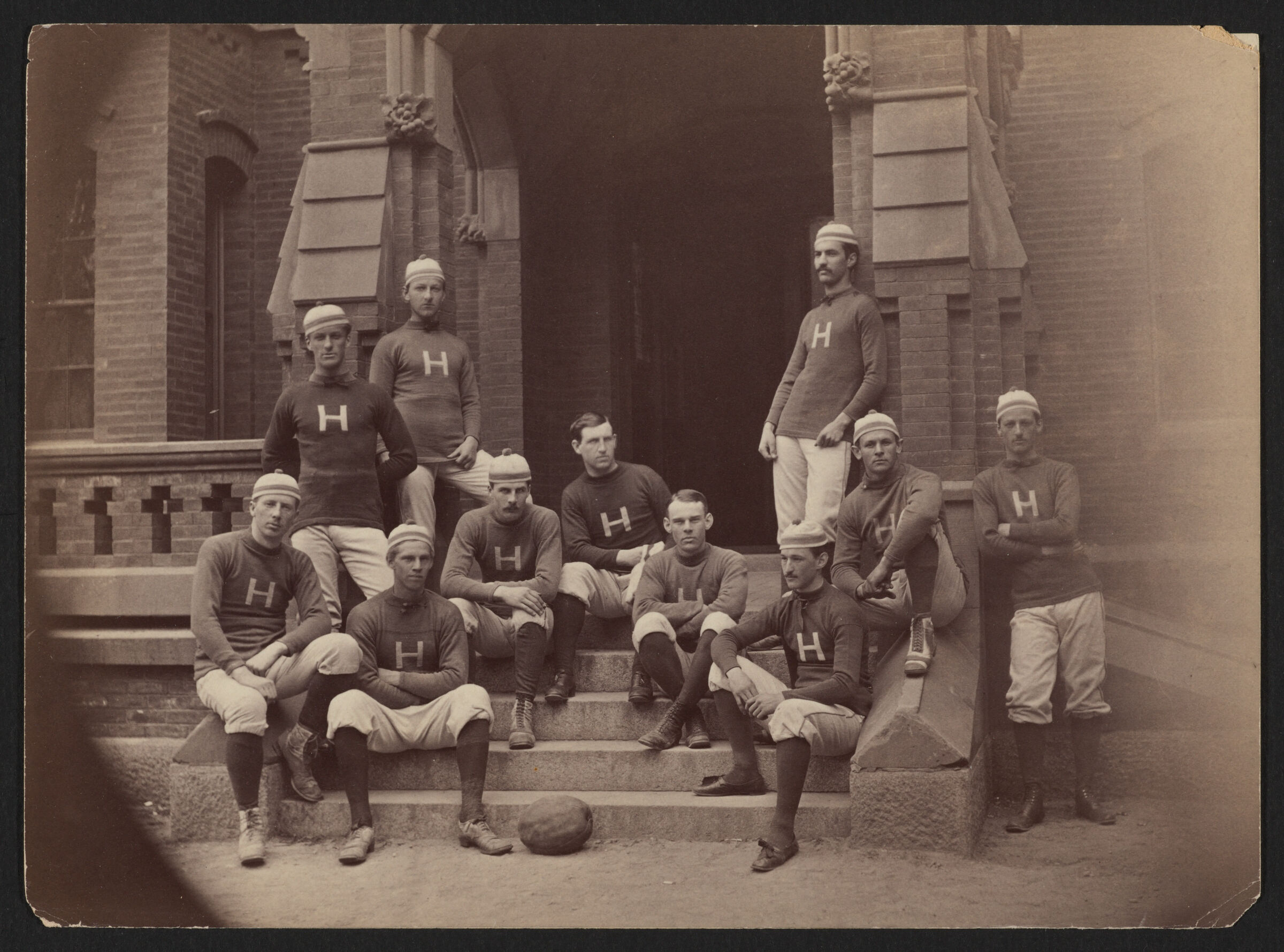
1878 Harvard Rugby Football team (which played using ellipsoidal rugby-style ball and applying rugby union rules)

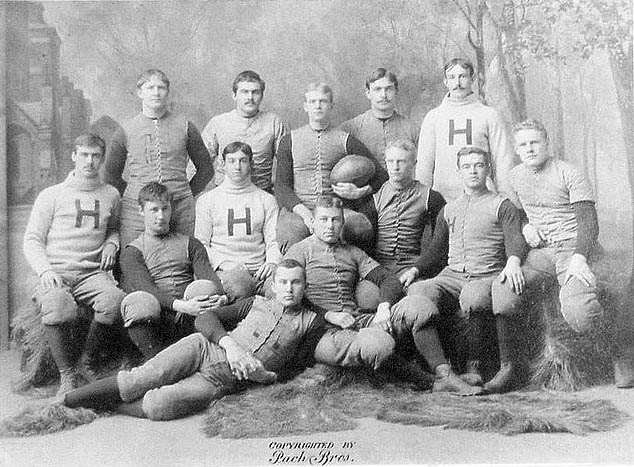
1880 Harvard Rugby Football team, which played using rugby union rules
