= Princeton Rugby =

US rugby union club, based in Princeton, NJ

(United States) Princeton
- Princeton University RFC Logo
- Full name: Princeton University Rugby Football Club
- Union: Ivy League
- Nickname: Tigers
- Founded: 1876; 150 years ago
- Location: Princeton, New Jersey
- Ground(s): Rickerson Field, Haaga House
- Coach(es): Tiffany Fa'ae'e (Varsity - Women); Bill LeClerc (Club - Men)
- League: Ivy Rugby Conference
Team kit

Official website
- www.princetonrugby.com

The Princeton University Rugby Football Club (or PURFC) is the Men's college rugby team of Princeton University. The men's team currently competes in the Ivy Rugby Conference, an annual rugby union competition played among the eight member schools of the Ivy League.

== History ==
=== Men's team ===
Princeton played Rutgers University in 1869 the first United States intercollegiate game, which, according to U.S. Soccer, used rules that resembled rugby union and association football and had little resemblance to gridiron American football as the teams were able to pick up and run with the ball but were not able to make a forward pass nor was there a line of scrimmage where a center snapped the ball but rather a scrum where players battled to gain possession.

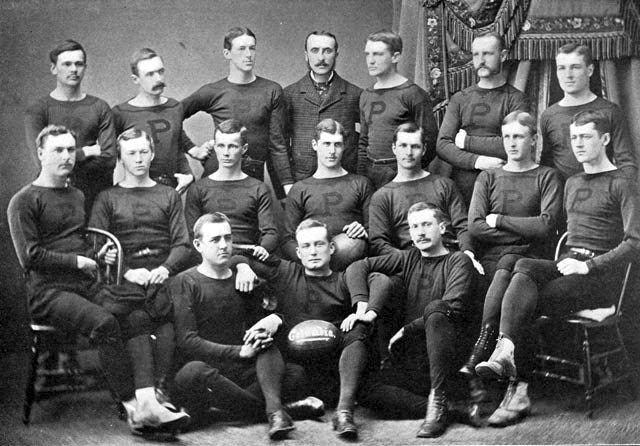
Princeton Tigers Rugby Team (photo circa 1877)

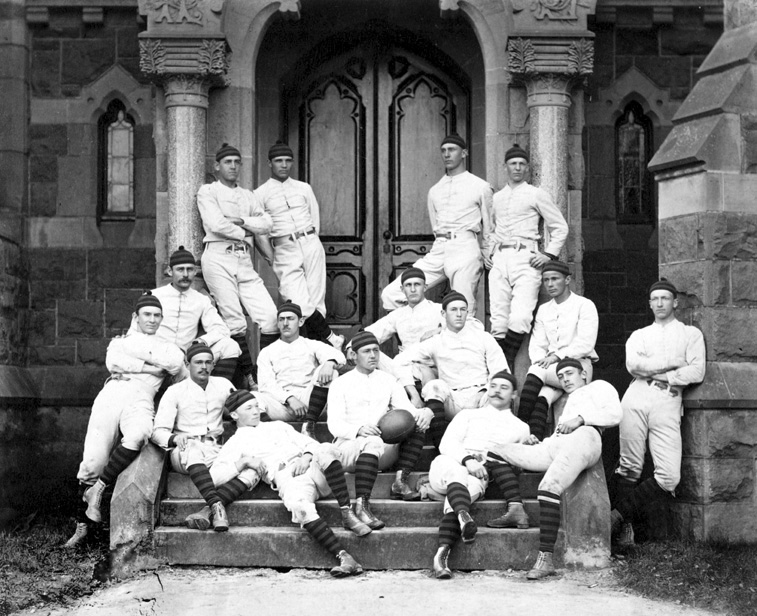
Princeton Tigers Rugby Team (photo circa 1879)

The men's team agreed to only play using rugby union code rules on November 23, 1876 when Princeton Yale, Harvard, and Columbia met at the Massasoit House in Springfield, Massachusetts and formed the Intercollegiate Football Association. Among Princeton's first games using a rugby code closer to rugby union was a game (employing rules similar to rugby union but with twenty players) less than two weeks earlier against the University of Pennsylvania rugby football team in Philadelphia on November 11, 1876. This game against Penn and other games Princeton played in 1876 make Princeton one of the oldest rugby clubs in North America. Princeton played in the very first Thanksgiving rugby football game against Yale on November 30, 1876.

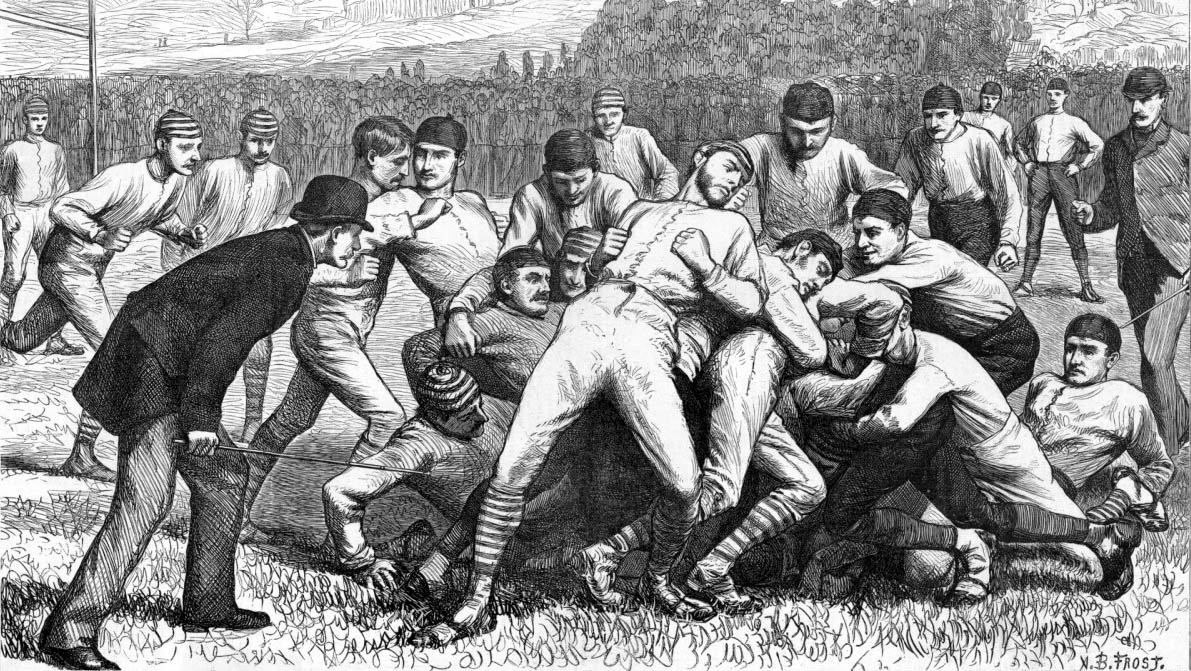
Depiction of the 1879 Princeton v Yale game by Arthur B. Frost

From 1877 until at least 1903, Princeton played football using rugby rules.

Indeed by 1893, forty thousand (40,000) spectators showed up to watch Princeton play Yale on Thanksgiving in New York’s Manhattan Field. The game they played on Thanksgiving of 1893 was much closer to rugby than American football as there were no forward passes (as such rule was not established for another dozen or so years when Walter Camp, a Yale Alumnus and rugby player, worked with University of Pennsylvania alumnus and rugby player John Heisman to change the rules of 19th century college rugby to create American football).

Princeton continued to have its alumni play rugby in first decade of 20th century as demonstrated by the experience of Donald Grant “Heff” Herring Sr., Princeton class of 1907, who as a senior, won Princeton’s first Rhodes scholarship for graduate study at Merton College, Oxford University where he became the first American to play on the Oxford University rugby team that beat arch-rival Cambridge University by the then-record score of 35 to 3.

A letter to the Varsity, a sports paper in Oxford, reviewed Herring’s stellar career at Princeton and Oxford, reported that he was caricatured in a cartoon in The Tatler, an English sporting magazine, and detailed that he created a sensation in America by stating in a 1910 letter to The Daily Princetonian that British rugby football was a better game than the American football game. In 1910 "Heff" Herring was hired by Woodrow Wilson just months before Wilson was elected Governor of New Jersey, but is better known for his military service in both world wars and acquiring one of the finest arts and crafts homes near campus, the Donald Grant Herring Estate

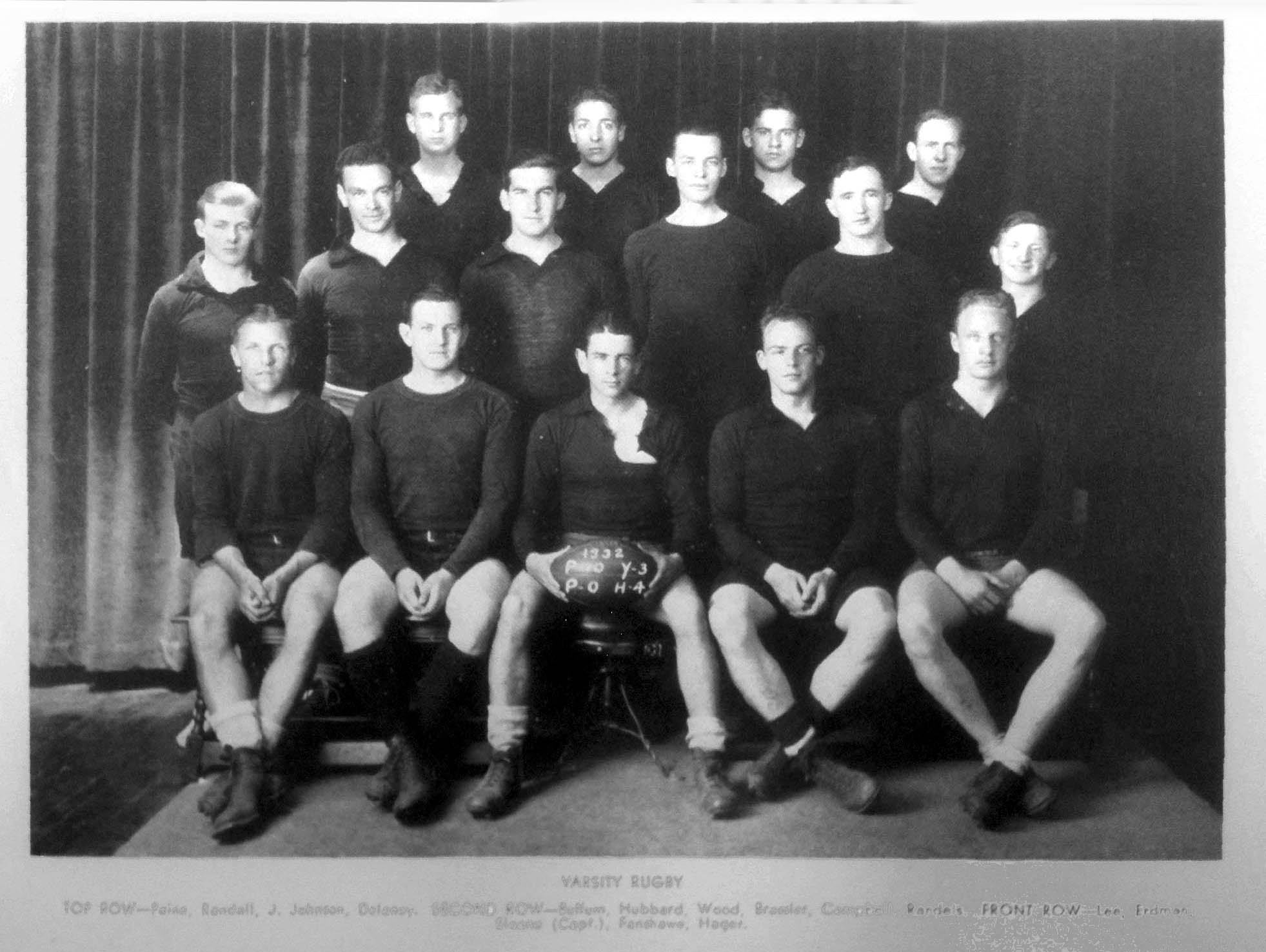
Princeton rugby team displaying 1932 record against Harvard and Yale

Princeton rugby was reorganized in 1931 under the leadership of Monte Barak, Hugh Sloan H.F. Langenberg, and coach John Boardman Whitton. It has been playing continuously ever since. Over 5,000 people attended the inaugural Harvard - Princeton game in 1931.

The club competes in the Ivy Rugby Conference. Princeton won the Ivy League Rugby Tournament (the tournament that crowned the Ivy Champion prior to the formation of Ivy Rugby Conference) in 2004, 1979, 1973, 1971, and 1969. The team also qualified for the Division I-AA Sweet 16 in 2014. The men's current coach is Bill LeClerc.

=== Women's team ===
Princeton University Women's Rugby Football Club (PUWRFC), is the women's rugby union club of Princeton. PUWRFC was established in 1979 by Catherine Chute. The new team aspired to compete in the young world of U.S. women's rugby, which was established only eight years earlier by the creation of four women's teams in 1972. Since then, the sport has grown quickly across America and PUWRFC has continually found itself at the top levels of Division I competition. Currently, the Princeton women compete in Division I of the NCAA. PUWRFC is coached by Karameli Fa'ae'e.

PUWRFC won back-to-back national championships in 1995 and 1996. Princeton women advanced to the Final Four in 1997, 1999, 2000, 2001, 2004 and 2005. Throughout the team's history, PUWRFC has often won the MARFU Championship, the Ivy League Tournament, and has secured several bids to the Sweet Sixteen. More than 35 Princeton women have been named All-Americans, many of whom have received honors for multiple years. In 2011 and 2012, the women placed 3rd in the USA Rugby Sevens Collegiate National Championships.

In the first year of regular season Ivy League play, the Princeton women won the 2013 Ivy League Championships.

The Women have also seen success with their rugby sevens squad, winning the shield final at the USA Rugby College 7s National Championship.

PUWRFC became Princeton's 19th women's varsity program in the 2022–23 academic year.

== Facilities ==
=== Rickerson Field at West Windsor Fields ===
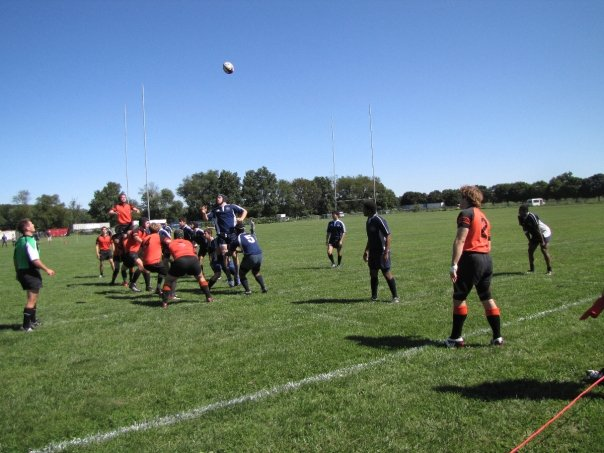
Princeton v. Yale at Rickerson Field, October 2009

Princeton Rugby has its club house, three game fields, two practice fields and a scrummage machine located at West Windsor Fields. The pitches are across Lake Carnegie and are accessible from campus by the Washington Road bridge.

Princeton University’s West Windsor fields were the site of a week-long USA Rugby Collegiate All-Star selection camp in 2009.

Princeton plays its home games on Rickerson Field located at West Windsor Fields. The field is named after Stu Rickerson, Class of 1971, and his Princeton varsity soccer playing spouse, Nancy Jones Rickerson, Class of 1987.

=== Haaga House ===
Opened in 2013, Princeton Rugby has a home in Haaga House located at West Windsor Fields. Haaga House was named after alumnus Paul G. Haaga Jr. following a donation to build the clubhouse. It includes Men's and Women's team rooms, visiting team changing rooms, bathroom facilities, storage rooms, and a large gathering space for events and spectators. Princeton is one of the few universities in America to have a dedicated rugby facility.

=== The Dickey-Larrimer Rugby Porch ===
The porch at the Princeton eating club Tiger Inn has been named "The Dickey-Larrimer Rugby Porch" in honor of Will Dickey, 68' and Terry Larrimer, 69', two former Princeton Rugby Captains. The porch also has a permanent installation called the "Rugby Wall" that lists all previous men's and women's Rugby Captains on bronze plaques. The rugby club holds gatherings on the porch, such as post-game socials and alumni events, and utilizes the Inn's boardroom for executive meetings.

== Cups and competitions ==
=== Ivy League regular season ===
The first Ivy League Rugby Championship was played in 1969 and won by Princeton. In 2009, the men joined a newly established Ivy Rugby Conference that was formed to foster better competition among rugby teams from the Ivy League schools and to raise the quality of play. Ivy Rugby formed committees to manage the league independently of the Territorial Area Unions. The Ivy Rugby Conference, and specifically its sevens tournament, has enabled the Ivy schools to tap into existing rivalries and fan bases. The women began a full season of Ivy League play in the fall of 2011.

=== Ivy Rugby 7s Championship ===
In addition to their traditional 15-a-side rugby union teams, the men and women each field a rugby sevens squad. Every year Princeton and the other Ivy Conference teams compete for the Ivy Rugby 7s Championship. The winner of the Ivy Championship qualifies for the College 7s National Championship.

=== The Koranda Cup ===
The Yale vs. Princeton rugby rivalry has strong historic roots dating back to the 1870s. The first game between the schools in the modern era occurred in 1931, which resulted in a Princeton win. In 2002, after many years of not playing Yale regularly, Princeton decided to re-establish the tradition and challenge Yale to an annual match each spring. The following year, Yale accepted Princeton's request by creating a trophy in memory of Rob Koranda. Rob died in a Chicago porch collapse in June 2003, a tragedy that claimed 12 other young lives.

=== New Jersey State Championship ===
The New Jersey State Intercollegiate Championship is hosted at West Windsor Fields every spring. The sport of rugby has been played in New Jersey for more than 135 years, yet it has only been since 2007 that the colleges of The Garden State have competed for the intercollegiate state championship. It is a knock-out tournament for the 1st and 2nd XV Men's rugby sides from every college in New Jersey. The tournament includes the selection of an All-New Jersey XV and MVP. Participants have included Drew, Fairleigh Dickinson, Montclair, NJIT, Princeton, Rowan, Rutgers, Seton Hall, TCNJ, and William Patterson.

Since the 2010 tournament, the players have helped raise awareness and call for more research funding for pancreatic cancer organizations. This intercollegiate rugby initiative has raised over $140,000 for The Pancreatic Cancer Action Network.

The winner of The New Jersey State Intercollegiate Championship is awarded "The Rickerson Cup." The trophy is named for Princeton alumnus and New Jersey native Stuart Rickerson, for his 40 plus years of support for the sport of rugby in New Jersey.

Rickerson Cup
Year	Champion	Score	Runner up
2016	Princeton		Seton Hall
2015	Princeton	80-5	Seton Hall
2014	Rowan	38-31	Rutgers
2013	Princeton	17-6	Rowan
2012	Princeton	33-0	William Patterson
2011	Princeton	36-0	William Patterson
2010	Princeton	10-3	William Patterson
2009	Princeton	63-5	Seton Hall
2008	Rutgers	22-12	Princeton
2007	Princeton	60-3	Seton Hall

=== Other competitions ===
The Doc Whitton Cup is contested annually between current undergraduate players and returning alumni during reunions. The first match was played in 1970 and has been played every year since.

Princeton competed in and won a number of times the now defunct Bermuda Intercollegiate Cup. The competition was held during Bermuda Rugby Week from the 1930s to the 1950s. The Cup was offered by the Bermuda Trade Development Board but was dropped in 1958 because of complaints about off-pitch behavior.

== Men's Awards ==
Rob Koranda MVP Award:
Princeton Men's Rugby Most Valuable Player Award, granted annually.

Phil Rogers' 79 Memorial Prize:
A winner will be recognized annually for his or her unique leadership and sportsmanship qualities, both on and off the rugby field. These qualities are well captured in Rudyard Kipling’s poem “IF”. They include courage, tenacity, composure, action and fairness. It is against these criteria that each candidate is measured.

Chris Mello Award:
Given annually to the Men's player who best demonstrates loyalty to the team on and off the field.

Harry Langenberg Award:
Awarded for outstanding dedication and service to the Princeton Rugby Football Club.

== International tours ==
Princeton Rugby goes on tour each spring. Past tours have included travel to Bermuda, England, Martinique, Trinidad and Tobago, Argentina, Ireland, Barbados, and the Cayman Islands. These tours have often resulted in wins over the local National XV.

Princeton Rugby, along with the Harvard and Yale Rugby teams, began the tradition of U.S. college students going on Spring Break to the Caribbean.

In 1940, the team traveled over spring break to Nassau and played before the Duke and Duchess of Windsor.

Alumni Tours, where former players travel abroad to compete and reconnect with their teammates, have been popular events since Princeton Rugby's early days. Recently, the "Flying Tigers" have had great success, beating the Curaçao, BVI, and USVI National Teams in 2013. In 2010, the alumni players visited Martinique with similar success.

== Titles ==
- Ivy Rugby Championship (5): 1969, 1971, 1973, 1979, 2004

== Individual accomplishments ==
More than 35 Princeton women have been named All-Americans. Below is an incomplete list.

- Jessica Lu, Class of 2018
- Dorothy Mittow, Class of 2014
- Lauren Rhode, Class of 2012

== Notable people ==
- James Baker – Chief of Staff for Ronald Reagan; Secretary of Treasury and Secretary of State for George H. W. Bush
- Robbie Bordley – Captain of the 1976 USA Eagles and Member of the US Rugby Hall of Fame
- William Clay Ford Jr. – Executive Chairman of the Ford Motor Company, Vice Chairman of the Detroit Lions
- Paul G. Haaga Jr. – Lawyer, financier, and philanthropist
- James S. Harlan – Attorney General of Puerto Rico, Chairman of the United States Interstate Commerce Commission
- Blair Lee I – United States Senator from Maryland
- Claiborne Pell – United States Senator from Rhode Island
- Richard Riordan – 39th Mayor of Los Angeles, California
- Emil Signes – Former Coach of US Men’s 7s Team, US Women’s 15s Team, US Women’s 7s Team and US U-23 Women’s 7s Team.
- Woodrow Wilson – 28th President of the United States

== In art and popular culture ==
- Elegant Violence – Photography by Amy Elkins exploring masculine identity featuring Princeton Rugby players.
- The Princeton Rugby Guy – Novella by David Kennedy Polanco.

== Sponsorship ==
Princeton Rugby's official kit provider is Akuma, Nike, Inc., and Rugby Imports.

Former kit sponsors have included KooGa and Barbarian Rugby wear, and Boathouse Sports.
