= Eugene V. Baker =

American football player and coach

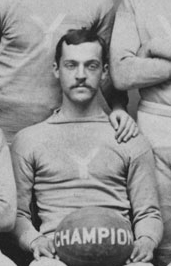

Profile
- Position: Back

Personal information
- Born: c. 1854
- Died: October 16, 1942; Los Angeles, California, U.S.

Career information
- College: Yale (1873–1877)

Awards and highlights
- 3× National champion (1874, 1876, 1877)

Eugene Vanvoy Baker (c. 1854 – October 16, 1942) was a pioneer college football player and coach for the Yale Bulldogs of Yale University. Playing alongside Walter Camp, he was captain of the 1876 and 1877 teams, which includes the first Yale team to defeat Harvard. A plaque in Yale's trophy room read "In Recognition of the Services of Eugene V. Baker, '77 The Organizer and Captain of Yale's First Victorious Football Team This Room Has been Furnished and The Tablet Placed Here By His Classmates 1893." He later became a major land developer in California, first as a bookkeeper for the San Gabriel Valley Land & Water Company. Photographs of the Baker family is in the Hargrett Library of the University of Georgia Libraries."

== Early life ==
Baker was born to Obadiah (later Orrin) S. Baker and his wife Sarah. Orrin's mother was a descendant of Stephen Hopkins of the Mayflower. Eugene's father Orrin was an attorney and Civil War veteran who defended Henry Wirz. Later in life Orrin suffered from delusions, and died from exhaustion "a hopeless, mentally deranged, prisoner."
