= 2026 MLR Draft =

General information
- Date: August 27, 2026
- Time: 6:00 PM EST

Overview
- League: Major League Rugby
- Teams: 5
- First selection: Logan Ballinger, Old Glory DC

The 2026 Major League Rugby Collegiate Draft was the seventh annual college draft for rugby union in North America, held on August 27, 2026.

== Format ==
The 2026 MLR Collegiate Draft was held on August 27, 2026, and broadcast on Major League Rugby's YouTube channel. The draft consisted of three rounds, with five teams participating following the dissolution of Anthem Rugby Carolina after World Rugby pulled its funding for the team. Draft order is set by final standings from the 2026 Major League Rugby season. For the first time, teams had the ability to trade draft picks for this draft or future drafts.

The New England Free Jacks forfeited their first-round pick due to an Anti-Tampering Policy violation.

== Player selection ==
Round	Pick #	Team	Player	Position	College
1	1	Old Glory DC	Logan Ballinger	Flanker	Life University
1	2	Seattle Seawolves	Solomon Williams	Scrum-half	California
1	3	California Legion	Coby Baker	Center	Cal Poly
1	4	Chicago Hounds	Hayden McKay	Hooker/Flanker	Mount St. Mary's University
2	5	New England Free Jacks	Owen Clarke	Flanker	Brown
2	6	Old Glory DC	Mario Storti	Fullback	St. Mary's College of California
2	7	Seattle Seawolves	David Cathcart	Winger	Lindenwood
2	8	California Legion	Aaron van Dyk	Flanker	Arkansas State
2	9	Chicago Hounds	Tyler White	Lock	St. Bonaventure
3	10	New England Free Jacks	Cormac Saint	Scrum-half	California
3	11	Old Glory DC	Nathaniel Deegan	Hooker	St. Mary's College of California
3	12	Seattle Seawolves	Tristan Hubsch	Lock	Life University
3	13	New England Free Jacks	Will Lindsay	Fullback	University of Mary Washington
3	14	Chicago Hounds	Fraser Leslie	Flanker	Walsh University

Fourteen players were selected across three rounds, representing eleven universities. Life University, the University of California, Berkeley, and Saint Mary's College of California led all universities with two selections each.
