= Lindenwood Lions men's rugby =

US rugby union club, based in Missouri

- Founded: 2011; 15 years ago
- Ground(s): Lindenwood Track; Harlen C. Hunter Stadium (Capacity: 7,250)
- Coach: Josh Macy
- League: Division I-A
1st kit	2nd kit

Official website
- lindenwoodlions.com/sports/mens-rugby

The Lindenwood Lions men's rugby team represents Lindenwood University in college rugby. Lindenwood plays in Division I-A in the Mid-South conference. The team is coached by Josh Macy. The Lindenwood men's rugby team won the 2012 USA Rugby Division II national championship in its inaugural season, and finished second in Division I-AA for the 2012–13 season. Following the 2012–13 season, Lindenwood moved up to Division I-A for the 2013–14 season. Lindenwood has also had success in Sevens. The Lions won the D1 7s National Championship in 2015 & the Red Bull University 7s Championship.

== Conference affiliations ==
- 2011–2012: Division II – Missouri Rugby Football Union
- 2012–2013: Division I-AA – Heart of America conference
- 2013–present : Division I-A – Mid-South conference

== History ==
=== 2011 launch ===
Lindenwood rugby began with the announcement in January 2011 the additions of men's and women's rugby to begin competition in the 2011–12 academic year. Lindenwood rugby was launched as one of the few varsity college rugby programs in the United States, and the program also provided scholarship funding for its student athletes. The university launched its rugby program, in part due to the growth of high school rugby throughout the country, Lindenwood's recognition of rugby's potential, and Lindenwood's realization that a strong rugby program could increase admissions. Ron Laszewski was selected as the first head coach of the Lions rugby team. Laszewski is a former head coach of the Saint Louis Bombers in the Rugby Super League, and was the first American coach to complete the International Rugby Board's Level 3 certification program. Lindenwood began play in USA Rugby Division II level in the Missouri Rugby Football Union (Missouri RFU), and in its first season Lindenwood played a mixed schedule of both Division I and II college programs. Lindenwood began with high expectations, intending from the outset to advance to higher levels of college rugby competition as the program matures. Despite the fact that the Lions had just begun competitive play, Rugby Mag ranked the Lions 2nd in their preseason poll behind defending Division II champions, University of Wisconsin–Whitewater.

=== Inaugural 2011–12 season ===
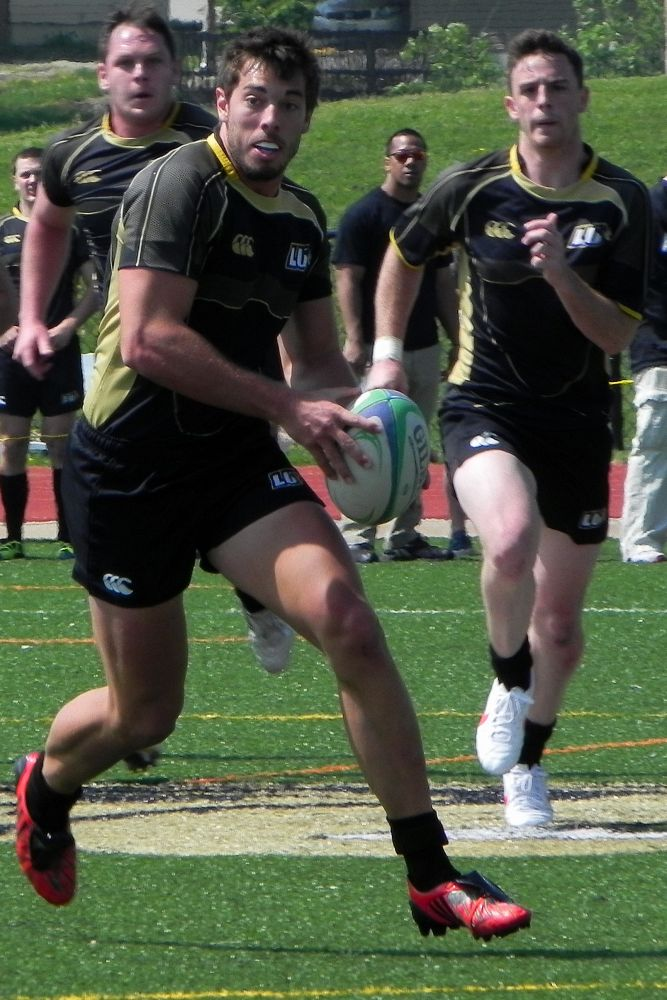
Lindenwood vs. N. Colorado.

The team played its first game in program history on September 4, 2011, in an exhibition match against coach Laszewski's former team, the St. Louis Bombers RFC, and won by a score of 21–12. The program earned its first official win against Kansas 47–10 on September 10, 2011. The team finished the fall 2011 regular season 11-0 and won the Missouri RFU Championship. Lindenwood outscored opponents 1077–43, with six overall 100-point games, six shutouts, and held opponents under 10 points in nine games.

Lindenwood's performance during the fall 2011 regular season qualified the Lions for the March 2012 Division II West Region playoffs. In the west semifinals, the Lions posted a 53–5 win over #5 ranked Northern Colorado. That win qualified the Lions for a place in the USA Rugby Division II National Sweet 16. In the West final, Lindenwood defeated Texas Tech 74–8 to clinch the West Region. The west region playoff victories, combined with Lindenwood's second side victory over D1-AA program Indiana, resulted in Lindewnood reaching first place in the D2 rankings for the first time in the program's short history.

In the national DII playoffs, Lindenwood defeated Wisconsin–Milwaukee 43–5 in the Sweet 16 round. In the quarterfinals, Lindenwood faced its toughest match of the playoffs against #2 ranked Wisconsin–Whitewater, the reigning Division II National Champions. Lindenwood prevailed 27–15, led by fullback Morgan Findlay's 3 tries, to advance to the USA Rugby DII Final Four and cement its #1 ranking in Division II. In the semifinals, Lindenwood defeated #4 ranked Utah Valley 57–10. In the championship game, Lindenwood defeated #3 ranked Salisbury 50–12 to win the USA Rugby DII National Championship.

Lindenwood's achieved significant results in its inaugural 2011–12 season—undefeated in conference play, winner of the Missouri RFU Championship, wins against opponents from the Big 12 (Kansas, Missouri, Texas Tech) and the Big Ten (Indiana), with both Missouri and Indiana ranked in the top 20 in D1, and a 6-0 playoff run culminating in a DII national championship. Lindenwood accounted for one third of all players named to the All D2 team, most notably Morgan Findlay, considered one of the best fullbacks in North American rugby, and flanker Trevor Locke, the championship MVP.

=== 2012–13 season ===
The Lions were promoted to Division 1-AA for the 2012–13 season to play in the Heart of America conference against regional rivals such as Missouri and Kansas. Lindenwood began the season ranked 6th in Division 1-AA (all five teams ahead of them were teams that had dropped down from D1-A). Lindenwood was also ranked 16th among all Division 1 schools at the beginning of the 2012–13 season, the only school that had been in Division 2 the prior season to be ranked in the Top 25. Any doubt as to whether Lindenwood could play at a Division I level was quickly erased in their first conference matchup, as Lindenwood defeated Kansas State University 98–5. Lindenwood finished the 2012–13 regular season first in the Heart of America conference with a 7–0 record. All seven conference wins were lopsided victories, with the closest match a 79–14 win against Truman State University. Lindenwood also scheduled several matches against non-conference D1A opponents Davenport (L 10–14), University of Wisconsin (W 54–10), Life University (L 10–31), and Arkansas State (L 15–26). Lindenwood's match against Davenport, featuring the reigning Division 2 champion against the reigning Division 1-AA champion, was Lindenwood's first ever loss against a college team. Sophomores Morgan Findlay and Tyler Black were named by Rugby Mag to the college All-Americans team for the 2012–13.

In sevens competition, the Lions clinched the Fall 2012 Heart of America 7s tournament, defeating Missouri in the semifinals, and defeating University of Arkansas in the final 21–5. The HOA 7s tournament win moved the Lions up into their first ever national top 25 ranking in rugby sevens, ahead of D1-A powerhouses such as Penn State, Ohio State and Colorado. The win in the HOA 7s tournament also earned the Lions automatic qualification to the 2012 USA Rugby Sevens Collegiate National Championships. In the national sevens championships, Lindenwood went 2–2 to finish tied for 13th. Morgan Findlay was named to both the USA Rugby and the Rugby Mag all tournament team.

=== 2013–14 season ===
For the 2013–14 season, Lindenwood left the Division I-AA Heart of America conference and was promoted to Division I-A to compete in the Mid-South conference. During the summer of 2013, Lindenwood hired as assistant coach the Fijian international Seru Rabeni who had played in two Rugby World Cups. During the 2013-14 winter break, the program announced that Ron Laszewski was stepping down as head coach, and that JD Stephenson was taking the reins. Lindenwood's first win in D1-A conference play came on March 15, 2014, with a 27–16 win against the #13 ranked Davenport Panthers.

== Current coaching staff ==
- (United States) Josh Macy (head coach)
- (United States) Jimmy Harrison (assistant coach)
- (United States) Nic Tyson (assistant coach)
- (United States) Aaron Browne (assistant coach)
- (United States) Trevor Locke (assistant coach)
- (United States) Dan Ward (manager)
- (United States) Michael Cullen (S&C coach)

== National results ==
=== National playoffs (15s) ===
Lindenwood won the 2012 USA Rugby Division II National Championship with a 50–12 win against Salisbury at Rio Tinto Stadium in Salt Lake City, Utah. The Lions went undefeated in the regular season, won the Western Division II Rugby Football Union Championship and the USA Rugby Midwest Regional Championship and advanced to the USA Rugby semifinals in Salt Lake City, Utah. In the semifinals, Lindenwood beat Utah Valley 57–10 before advancing to the championship game. With the win over Salisbury, Lindenwood became the first men's rugby program to win a collegiate national championship in its first year of existence.

=== USA Rugby Sevens National Championships ===
Lindenwood won the men's USA Rugby Sevens Division I national championship in 2015, 2017, 2018, and 2019.

==== Format & Results ====
The men's tournament features 24 teams, divided into six pools of four teams each. Eight teams qualify for the quarterfinals - the winners from each of the six groups, plus the two best second-placed teams from among the six pools.

Year	Location	Champion	Score	Runner up	Third	Fourth	Other Quarterfinalists
2011	College Station, TX	Life University	22–17	Central Washington	Arkansas State	Kutztown	St. Mary's, Colorado, Tennessee, Cal Poly
2012	College Station, TX	Arkansas State	21–7	Life University	Delaware	Saint Mary's	Navy, Central Washington, Texas A&M, Kutztown
2013	Greensboro, NC	Arkansas State	32–12	Saint Mary's	Dartmouth, Central Washington		Life University (5th), Davenport (6th), Air Force, Lindenwood
2014	Tournament moved from fall 2014 to spring 2015						
2015	Denver, CO	Lindenwood	28–10	Davenport	Central Washington	Utah	Saint Mary's (5th), Arizona St. (6th), American International College, San Diego St.

Note: There was no distinction between 3rd and 4th places in 2013.

== Conference results ==
=== Conference results (XVs) ===
Season	Division	Conference	W/L Record	Finish
2011–12	Division II	Missouri Rugby Football Union	8–0	Champion
2012–13	Division I-AA	Heart of America	7–0	Champion
2013–14	Division I-A	Mid-South	2–4	Third
2014–15	Division I-A	Mid-South	1–3	Third
2014–16	Division 1-A	Mid-South	2-2	Second
Total conference championships			2

=== 7's tournament ===
Year	Championship	Conference / Tournament	Record	Finish
2012	Division I-AA	Heart of America	4-0-1	Champion
2013	Division I	Notre Dame 7s	5-0	Champion
2013	DI National Championship	Allied 7s (Norman, OK)	3-1	3rd
2015	DI National Championship	Denver, CO	6-0	National champions
2016	DI National Championship	Cary, NC	5-1	Plate champions (5th)
2016	Red Bull Uni 7s	Denver, CO	6-0	Championships
2016	Red Bull Uni World Championship	Bath, London	4-2	3rd
Total 7's championships			4

== Season-by-season records ==
Year	Played	Win	Draw	Loss	PF	PA	Diff	Ranking	Playoffs
2011–12	20	20	0	0	1,469	113	+1,356	1st	Division II National Champions
2012–13	15	11	0	4	-	-	-	2nd	Division 1-AA Runner Up
2013–14	9	4	0	5	-	-	-	15th	Lost in 1-A National Semi-Finals
2014–15	22	15	1	6	-	-	-	7th	Lost in 1-A National Semi-Finals
2015-16	14	10	0	4				4th	Lost D1A National Semi-Finals

== Head coaches ==
1. Ron Laszewski (2011–2013)
2. JD Stephenson (2014–2016)
3. Josh Macy (2016–Present)

== See also ==
- College Premier Division
- USA Rugby Sevens Collegiate National Championships
