= Lindenwood Lions =

Athletic teams of Lindenwood University

Lindenwood Lions and Lady Lions
- University: Lindenwood University
- Nickname: Lions/Lady Lions
- NCAA: Division I
- Conference: OVC (primary); OVC–Big South (football); ASUN (lacrosse); Summit (swimming & diving); Horizon (men's tennis); MIVA (men's volleyball); Independent (men's ice hockey); Atlantic Hockey America (women's ice hockey)
- Athletic director: Jason Coomer
- Location: St. Charles, Missouri
- Varsity teams: 30 (14 men's and 16 women's)
- Football stadium: Hunter Stadium
- Basketball arena: Hyland Arena
- Ice hockey arena: Centene Community Center
- Baseball stadium: Lou Brock Sports Complex
- Soccer stadium: Hunter Stadium
- Lacrosse stadium: Hunter Stadium
- Colors: Black and gold
- Mascot: Leo the Lion
- Website: lindenwoodlions.com

The Lindenwood Lions and Lady Lions are the intercollegiate athletic teams that represent Lindenwood University, located in St. Charles, Missouri, in intercollegiate sports as a member of the NCAA Division I ranks, primarily competing in the Ohio Valley Conference for most of its sports since the 2022–23 academic year.

Prior joining to NCAA Division I, the Lions previously competed in the Great Lakes Valley Conference (GLVC) from 2019–20 to 2021–22; in the D-II Mid-America Intercollegiate Athletics Association (MIAA) from 2013–14 to 2018–19; and as an NCAA D-II Independent during its provisional season in the 2011–12 school year.

Prior joining to NCAA Division II, Lindenwood was a member of the National Association of Intercollegiate Athletics (NAIA) and competed within the Heart of America Conference (HAAC) as its primary conference from 1996–97 to 2010–11, in addition to other athletic organizations for sports not sponsored by the HAAC; as well as in the American Midwest Conference from 1993–94 to 1995–96.

In 2023, the university discontinued 10 athletic teams.

== History ==
=== Early history ===
Modern intercollegiate athletics at Lindenwood trace roots back to intracollegiate sports, gym classes, and recreational activities associated with the development of modern sports during the late 1800s and early 1900s in the United States. Lindenwood added obligatory physical education classes to its curriculum in the 1890s. In 1905, the school's first athletic association was created to oversee sport and recreational activities on campus. The athletic association sponsored popular sports and activities of the time period such as tennis, bowling, fencing, basketball, and walking clubs. In the late 1940s Lindenwood's athletic teams began regular intercollegiate competition, sponsoring women's basketball, field hockey, and equestrian.

=== NAIA era ===
After becoming a coeducational college in 1969, Lindenwood's modern athletic department formed. Baseball, basketball, and soccer became the college's first three men's sports in 1970; and Lindenwood became a member of the National Association of Intercollegiate Athletics (NAIA). After the athletic programs became established Lindenwood's first athletic accomplishments came after more than a decade in the NAIA when the women's soccer team reached the 1986 NAIA Women's Soccer Championship. The program made 13 NAIA tournament appearances during the late 1980s through the 1990s; the run included three third-place finishes and second-place finishes. The 2000 national championship saw Lindenwood lose 1–0 to Simon Fraser in five overtimes, after 162 minutes of play in one of the longest college soccer championship matches. The university continued to expand athletics in the 1980s and by 1989 Lindenwood sponsored all 21 NAIA championship-sponsored sports.

In the 1990s the university expanded athletic programs and added and upgraded facilities. Lindenwood joined its first conference in 1993 when the university became a member of the American Midwest Conference (AMC). Three years later, Lindenwood joined the Heart of America Conference (HAAC). From 1999 to 2010 the university continued to expanded athletic offerings and added 25 new sports that grew the athletic department to over 45 varsity sports teams, making LU one of the largest athletic departments in the United States in terms of sports offered. Lindenwood University has been competing in NAIA athletics for nearly 40 years but has begun the application process for NCAA Division II membership. Lindenwood officially concluded its NAIA and HAAC membership at the conclusion of the 2010–11 academic year. During the university's 15 seasons a member of the HAAC the Lions set a conference record, winning 128 HAAC titles. Lindenwood averaged 8.5 conference titles a year and won at least one conference championship in sport sponsored by the conference.

=== Move to NCAA ===
As Lindenwood continued to upgrade and/or replace many of its sports facilities and add new programs, and have teams consistently ranked in the top of the NAIA and other respective sport organizations for non-NAIA sports, the interest in Lindenwood transitioning to the NCAA grew. In the early 2000s, the university explored options for at least a partial transition for several non-NAIA sports. On February 12, 2009, the Lindenwood University board of directors authorized the administration to begin the application process for NCAA Division II membership. For two years, Lindenwood would remain a member of the NAIA and Heart of America Athletic Conference. In 2012–2013, the school would be a provisional member of the NCAA. The fourth year, 2013–2014, the NCAA would vote to make Lindenwood an active member.

Ohio Valley Conference logo in Lindenwood's colors

On July 12, 2010, Lindenwood was accepted into NCAA Division II. Plans included moving all 21 sports that competed in NAIA to move to NCAA Division II along with the non-NAIA sports of field hockey, men's lacrosse, and women's lacrosse. Women's ice hockey and men's volleyball were selected by the university to compete in NCAA Division I, and all other sports would remain in their non-NCAA and non-NAIA sport organizations. With expectation of NCAA approval in June 2010 LU applied to join the Mid-America Intercollegiate Athletics Association (MIAA). Lindenwood was approved for membership into the MIAA on September 24, 2010, with the affiliation taking place in 2012–2013 school year for all 17 MIAA-sponsored sports. In addition men's volleyball joined the Midwestern Intercollegiate Volleyball Association (MIVA). In June 2011, the Western Intercollegiate Lacrosse Association (WILA) announced the addition of Lindenwood for men's and women's lacrosse. Lindenwood was admitted into the conference on November 11, 2011, and began conference play starting in the 2012–13 season. In July 2011, the university announced the addition of women's gymnastics as the 27th NCAA athletic program. The university successfully completed the transition process in 2013 and begins active membership status in the NCAA in the 2013–14 academic year.

Effective July 1, 2019, Lindenwood became a member of the Great Lakes Valley Conference after seven years with the MIAA. On February 23, 2022, at a press conference at Robert F. Hyland Performance Arena, it was announced that Lindenwood University would move to NCAA Division I Athletics and join the Ohio Valley Conference. In early December 2023, the school announced that it would be cutting nine of its NCAA programs: men's lacrosse, men's and women's swimming and diving, men's tennis, men's indoor and outdoor track and field, men's wrestling, women's field hockey and women's gymnastics.

== Sports sponsored ==
Men's sports	Women's sports
Baseball	Basketball
Basketball	Beach volleyball
Cross country	Cross country
Football	Golf
Golf	Ice hockey
Ice hockey	Lacrosse
Rugby	Rugby^{2}
Soccer	Soccer
Volleyball	Softball
	Tennis
	Track and field^{1}
	Volleyball
	Wrestling^{2}
^{1} – Track and field includes both indoor and outdoor^{2} – NCAA emerging sports for women

Lindenwood University sponsors 14 men's and 16 women's intercollegiate athletic programs in NCAA-sanctioned sports. Most sports compete in the Ohio Valley Conference. The men's and women's lacrosse teams play in the Atlantic Sun Conference, while both swimming & diving teams compete in the Summit League. Men's soccer also competed in the Summit League before the OVC launched a men's soccer league in the 2023 season. Shortly after Lindenwood joined the OVC, that conference announced it was merging its men's tennis league into the Horizon League effective with the 2022–23 season, with all OVC men's tennis schools, including Lindenwood, becoming Horizon associate members. None of the teams that compete in these conferences, except for the beach volleyball team, will be eligible for NCAA championship events until Lindenwood completes its Division I transition in 2026–27. The field hockey and men's wrestling teams, which compete as D-I independents for the time being, are also subject to this restriction.

Teams in sports that do not have separate Division II championships remain eligible for NCAA championships during the transition. Beach volleyball and women's gymnastics each have a single NCAA championship event open to members of all three divisions. Beach volleyball, newly added for 2022–23, competes in the OVC and gymnastics in the Midwest Independent Conference. Men's and women's ice hockey and men's volleyball all have championship events open to both D-I and D-II members. Men's ice hockey, added as a varsity sport in 2022–23, competes as an independent; women's ice hockey is a member of Atlantic Hockey America, and men's volleyball competes in the Midwestern Intercollegiate Volleyball Association. Women's wrestling, currently recognized by the NCAA as part of its Emerging Sports for Women program but without an NCAA championship event, competes as an independent.

In December 2023, the university discontinued nine NCAA athletic teams and 10 in all.

=== Basketball ===
==== Men's basketball ====
Lindenwood hired Lance Randall in the summer of the 2015 to lead the men's basketball program. Randall previously coached at St. Leo. In his first season at the helm of the Lions, the team went 16–14 which included the program's first MIAA tournament win at Pittsburg State.

The previous head coach of the men's basketball program was Brad Soderberg, former Division I head coach at Saint Louis and Wisconsin, who left after the 2014–15 season to become an assistant at Virginia. He was hired in 2009 and joined the Lions for the 2009–10 season. Under Soderberg, the Lions compiled an overall record of 23–10, going 13–7 in the HAAC. The season was the most wins since the 2005–06 season when the Lions won the HAAC Tournament. Soderberg's 2009–10 team set a new school record for most home wins with a home record of 13–1. On January 6, 2011, the Lions set a new school record for most straight wins after defeating Missouri Valley 77–66 for the team's 12th straight win. The Lions finished the regular season 26–4 and earned an automatic bid to the 2011 NAIA Division I men's basketball tournament as well as won the 2011 HAAC Regular Season Title. The 26 wins set a new best record in school history. The team played an independent schedule of NCAA DII and NAIA teams during the 2011–12 season and finished the regular season with a record of 26–3, tying the school record for wins set the season prior. The season was highlighted by a 13-game win streak from November 19, 2011, until it was broken in overtime by Central State on January 14, 2012. The season saw the Lions set a new team scoring record on December 14, 2012, in a 136–57 win over Concordia (MO). Lindenwood averaged 85.97 points during the season and was held below the 80 point mark nine times, while scoring over 100 points three times. Lindenwood ended the 2011–12 season winning the 2012 NCAA Transitional Tournament championship, which involved teams transitioning to the NCAA Division II that were ineligible for mainstream NCAA postseason play. In the opening game, LU defeated Minot State 65–54, before they defeated the University of Sioux Falls 85–75. On May 11, 2015, it was announced that Lance Randall of St. Leo University had been hired to replace Soderberg.

==== Women's basketball ====
The current head coach of the women's basketball program is Tony Francis, formerly assistant coach and recruiting coordinator at Saint Louis for eight seasons. He was hired in April 2010, in his first season with the Lady Lions he led the team to a 21–10 overall record, 15–5 in the HAAC. The Lady Lions finished the season with a 72–81 loss to Avila in the HAAC Tournament semifinal round.

=== Women's field hockey ===
Lindenwood field hockey competes as an NCAA Division II independent program against mostly Division II and Division III opponents, as well as Division I competition, including in-state programs at Missouri State and Saint Louis. The Lions have posted a record of 30–31 over the past five seasons. After dismal seasons in 2004 and 2006, the team has recorded plus .500 records 2007–2009. In 2010 the LU athletics department identified field hockey as one of the sports moving to NCAA Division II, placing field hockey in the same division as rival Bellarmine University. LU field hockey was first eligible for NCAA postseason play in 2013, making it the first season in program history that LU could compete for a championship due to the NAIA not sponsoring a championship for field hockey.

=== Football ===
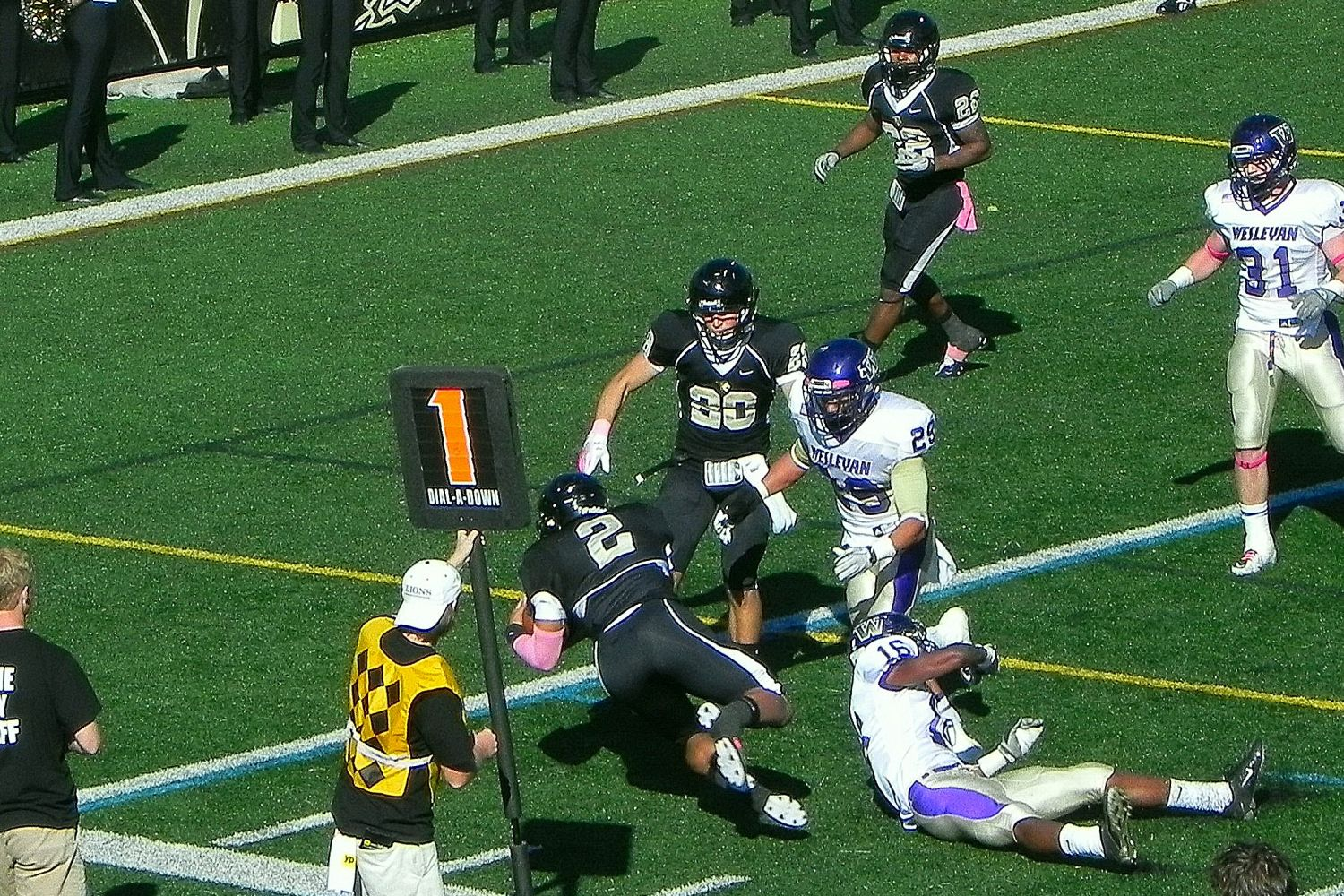
Quarterback, David Ortega, dives toward the goal line in a game against Kansas Wesleyan

The current head football coach at Lindenwood is Patrick Ross, who has held the position since 2004. The program began in 1990 under David Schroeder and has accumulated an overall record of 134 wins, 121 losses, and 2 ties.(as of conclusion of the 2012 season). Lions Football has had recent success, winning the HAAC Championship three seasons in a row from 2007 to 2009. In the 2009 season the Lions went 12–0 and advanced to the NAIA Football Championship Series in Rome, Georgia before losing to the 2009 NAIA Champions Sioux Falls by the final score 22–25 and finishing with a record of 13–1. Lions football entered the 2010 season ranked 2nd in the 2010 NAIA Football Coaches' Preseason Top 25 Poll. The team finished ranked second in the HAAC in 2010, only losing one game in the regular season to first placed MidAmerica Nazarene University 20–26 on September 25, 2010. Lindenwood suffered a 38–46 loss at home in the first round of the NAIA Football Championship Series to the University of Saint Francis and finished the 2010 season 9–2 overall, ranked 1st in the NAIA in scoring with an average of 52.5 points per game and 1st in total offensive yards with an average of 551.5 yards per game. As part of the transition to NCAA Division II, the 2010 schedule would be the last full NAIA schedule played by Lindenwood; the Lions played an independent schedule of NCAA Division I FCS, Division II, and NAIA schools for the 2011 season and finished the season 8–3. The 2011 season included the school's first win over a Division I program when Lindenwood upset Northern Colorado 22–20. The program will begin a full Division II and MIAA conference schedule starting in 2012. The team completed its first full Division II schedule as a member of the MIAA in 2012. In the team's first season in the new conference, the Lions recorded an 8–3 regular season and finished fourth in the conference. Lindenwood accepted a bid to play in the 2012 Mineral Water Bowl against Winona State where the Lions fell to the Warriors 21–41 in their first postseason NCAA bowl appearance.

Lindenwood University took a significant step in its athletics program's evolution as it announced its acceptance of an invitation to join the Ohio Valley Conference (OVC) in the fall of 2022.

During the 2022–2023 academic year, Lindenwood underwent reclassification to Division 1, signifying a notable milestone for its athletics program. This transition allowed the Lions to participate in the OVC's regular season schedules and compete for OVC championships across all 18 sponsored sports during the 2022–2023 seasons.

The Ohio Valley Conference, which includes Division 1-AA (FCS) level football, offered a new platform for Lindenwood's sports teams. Lindenwood President Dr. John Porter expressed the university's enthusiasm, stating, "Lindenwood is pleased to join the Ohio Valley Conference as we pursue our transition to NCAA Division I. This opportunity will have a positive impact on our university as a whole and provide our student athletes with high-level competitive experiences. Our move to NCAA Division I athletics and membership in the OVC aligns with our strategic plan, supporting enrollment growth, enhancing university visibility, and generating revenue. We are eager to begin competition at this elevated level and extend a warm welcome to OVC member schools visiting our campus."

The Lions finished the 2022 season with a record of 7–3, 2–3 Ohio Valley Conference play to finish in a 3-way tie for third place in the OVC. They played as provisional members of the NCAA Division I FBS for the 2022 season. They became active members during the 2023–2024 academic year, the first for the Big South–OVC Football Association, a football-only alliance between the OVC and the Big South Conference.

=== Women's gymnastics ===
The Lady Lions have won consecutive USAG National Championships under head coach Jen Llewellyn.

Women's gymnastics was added as Lindenwood's 27th NCAA athletic program in July 2011. Lady Lions Gymnastics began competition in the 2012–2013 academic year with Gretchen Goerlitz serving as LU's first gymnastics coach. After an exhibition meet versus Mizzou, The Lady Lions began the inaugural season of competition against No. 16 Penn State Denver at a meet hosted by the Denver Pioneers. The team finished fifth, out of six teams, in the Midwest Independent Conference, setting a program records of 193.050. Despite finishing eighth in the final USAG rankings, the team had to relinquish its spot in the team competition for host Centenary, instead sending six gymnasts for the USAG individual competition. Freshman gymnast Rachel Zabawa Won the beam competition to conclude the inaugural season for the Lions and earning the first individual national championship for the LU gymnastics program. Following the 2013 season, the university named Jen Kesler the second head coach in the program's history. The former Oregon State All-American began the inaugural season as a graduate assistant but served as interim head coach after Goerlitz resigned in January.

=== Ice hockey ===
==== Men's ice hockey ====
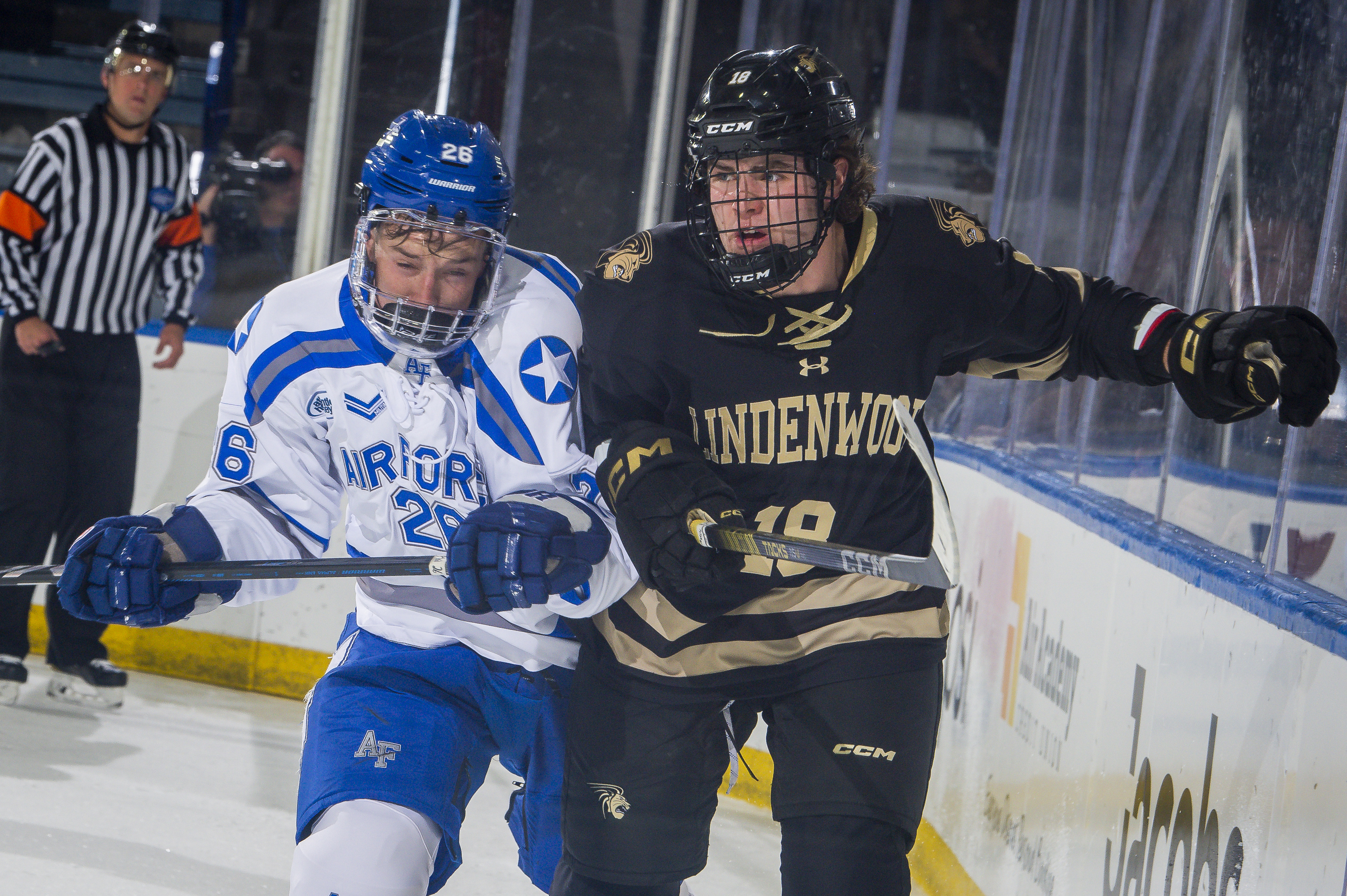
Lindenwood plays against Air Force in its first NCAA hockey game on October 7, 2023

Lindenwood University added ice hockey in 2003. The men's team currently competes in the varsity club ACHA Division I, and a JV men's team competes at the ACHA Division II level in the Mid-American Collegiate Hockey Association. The women's team played at ACHA Division I level through 2010–11, after which it moved to NCAA Division I, first as in independent for 2011–12 and then in College Hockey America starting with the 2012–13 season. The Lions men's and Lady Lions women's teams won back-to-back ACHA DI National Champions for 2009 and 2010 and LU men's hockey is the 2011 runner-up. The team is a member of the Central States Collegiate Hockey League and has had recent success on the ice, as national runner-up to the University of Illinois in 2008 and winning their first national championship in 2009 in a rematch of the 2009 game, this time defeating Illinois. 2009 marked the first year a school has won national championships at men's and women's hockey in the same season.

The Lions continued in the 2009–10 season and recorded a regular season record of 42–3–0–2 (42 wins, 3 losses, and 2 shootout losses). The Lions came in second in the CSCHL standings to Ohio University but won the league playoff championship. LU advanced to the ACHA DI National Tournament ranked #1 in the nation and repeated as National Champions, defeating Iowa State 2–0 in the championship game.

Following the 2009–2010 season, Lindenwood's first and only men's ice hockey coach, Derek Schaub, announced he would step down as head coach of the team. Under Schaub, who stepped down to coach the LU men's lacrosse team, the Lions amassed a record of 217–57–3. Schaub was replaced by assistant coach and former NHL player with the St. Louis Blues, Rick Zombo. Under Zombo the Lions won their third consecutive CSCHL Regular Season Championship and finished the regular season with a 29–3–0 record and qualified for the 2011 national championship tournament. The team finished the 2010–11 season with an overall record of 32–4–0 and 13–1–0 in the CSCHL. The season concluded on March 9, 2011, when the Lions were defeated by Davenport University 2–3 in overtime of the championship game.

For the 2011–12 season, the Lions added 11 freshmen and three transfers to the roster. After starting the season with a record of 11–4–0, the team recorded a 16-game win streak to end the regular season with a record of 27–4. In January 2012, the university announced that former NHL and international head coach, Ted Sator, was hired as an assistant coach. LU finished the regular season going undefeated in CSCHL conference play for the first time in the history of the program. The team also received an autobid with the CSCHL title to the 2012 ACHA DI National Tournament. The Lions defeated Central Oklahoma 5–2 in the second round, after the team was seeded second and received a first round bye; followed by the Minot State 7–4 in the quarterfinals. In the semifinal round, the Lions lost 3–6 to Delaware. The loss to the Blue Hens ended LU's four season streak of reaching the championship game. The team finished the season with an overall record of 31–5.

Lindenwood will field its first varsity team in 2022–23, the same time it starts its transition to Division I.

=== Women's ice hockey ===
The Lady Lions started NCAA Division I competition in the 2011–12 season with no conference affiliation, making the program one of two Independent NCAA women's programs at the time. In September 2011, it was announced that Lindenwood officially submitted an application to join College Hockey America (CHA) for the 2012–2013 season. On November 11, 2011, Lindenwood was notified by CHA officials that the program was accepted, becoming a member and starting conference competition starting with the 2012–13 season. Lindenwood continued to play in CHA through the 2023–24 season, after which that conference merged with the men-only Atlantic Hockey Association to form Atlantic Hockey America.

The program previously competed at the ACHA Division I level as members of the Central Collegiate Women's Hockey Association (CCWHA). Lindenwood women's hockey has reached the championship game five seasons in a row and won four National Championships in 2006, 2008, 2009, and 2010; and runner-up in 2007. The first four appearances from 2006 to 2009 were against Robert Morris University (Chicago). The Lady Lions concluded the 2010–10 season with a program-best 43 wins, including CCWHA regular season and conference tournament championships. The Lady Lions advanced to the ACHA Women's Division I National Championship Tournament. After pool play the lady Lions beat University of Rhode Island in the semi-finals before a 2–0 shutout of Michigan State for the national championship. The Lady Lions concluded the 2010–11 regular season with a 29–2–2 record and overall record of 33–3–2. The team won a fourth consecutive CCWHA title in a 3–0 win over Grand Valley State University, The Lady Lions advanced through pool play before falling 1–3 to rival Michigan State in the semifinal round, taking third place.

The 2011–12 season marked the program's first in NCAA competition. The Lady Lions struggled early including back-to-back shutouts by the defending NCAA champions, Wisconsin Badgers. The team didn't win their first game until 11 games into the season, against Saint Benedict; it was the team's only win in the first half of the season. LU finished the season on a six-game win streak from January 14 to February 11, 2012. The team also swept former NAIA rival, Robert Morris (IL) in a three-game exhibition series, ending the season with a record of 8–21–0.

=== Lacrosse ===
==== Men's lacrosse ====
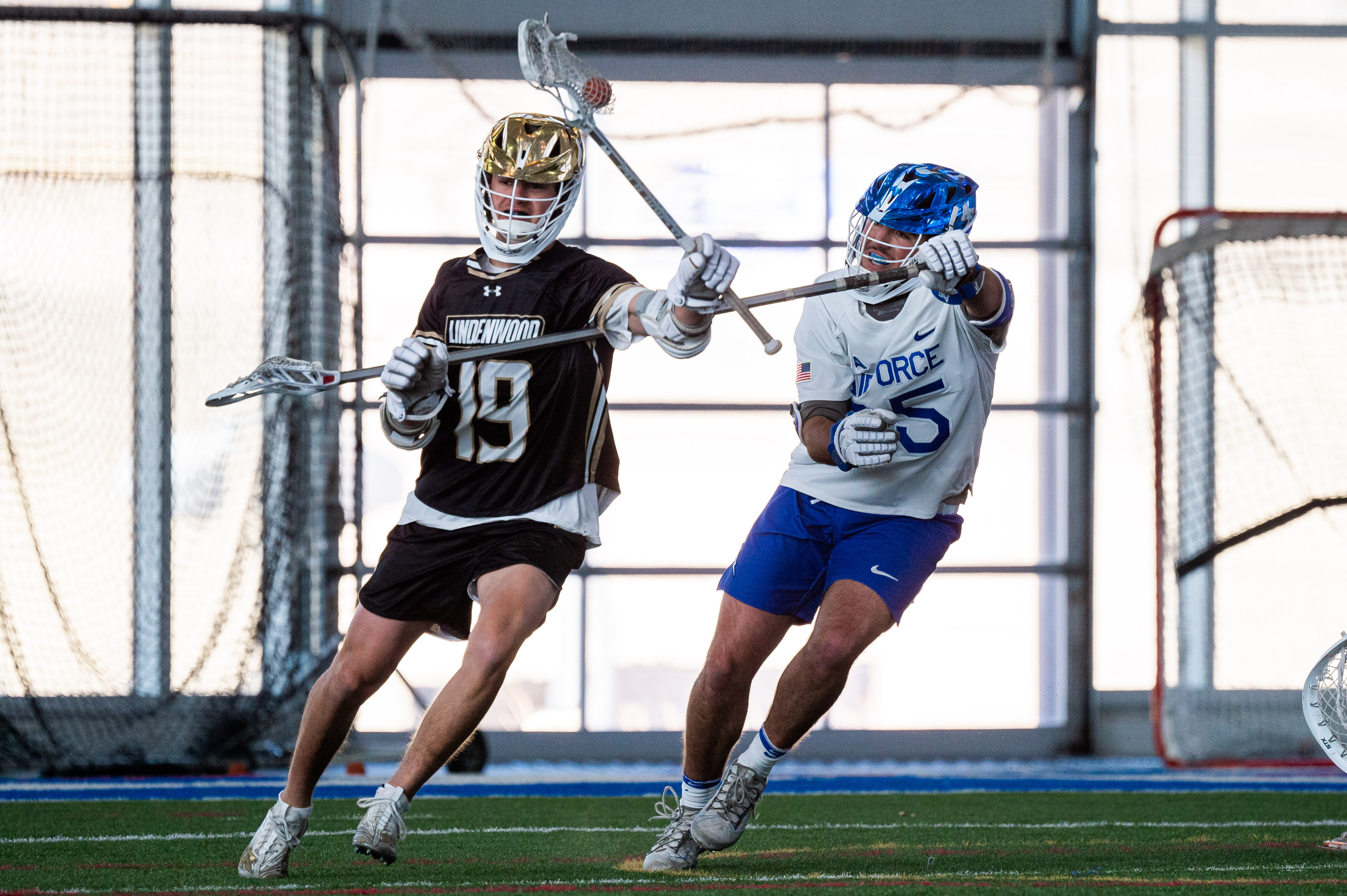
A men's lacrosse game between Lindenwood and Air Force in 2023

Men's lacrosse is coached by Jim Lange. The team competes in the ASUN Conference, which it joined for men's and women's lacrosse when it joined the OVC.

Upon establishing its varsity program in the 2012 season, Lindenwood competed an NCAA Division II independent before joining the GLVC along with the bulk of the school's other sports in the 2019–20 school year (2020 lacrosse season). Prior to the 2012 season, the program competed at the Division I MCLA level in the Great Rivers Lacrosse Conference (GRLC) since the program began in 2003 through the 2011 season because the NAIA does not sponsor lacrosse. Lindenwood won six GRLC championships, including five straight titles from 2005 to 2009. Lions Lacrosse made a total of six MCLA National Tournament appearances, with the last to the 2011 MCLA National Tournament in Denver, Colorado before losing in the first round 8–16 to #1 ranked University of Michigan. Since Lindenwood compiled a 119–46 record from 2003 to 2011 in the MCLA DI level. Derek Schaub, the first coach in the program's history who returned to the program in 2011 during the team's transition to the NCAA. The Lions joined the Western Intercollegiate Lacrosse Association (WILA) in the 2011–12 academic year. In March 2012, Lindenwood announced that after a single season as a member of the WILA, the men's lacrosse program joined the new ECAC Division II Lacrosse League starting in the 2013 season and posted an 8–5 record in the team's second season of NCAA competition. The Lions remained a member of the ECAC until the league's demise after the 2016 season, which followed the announcement that the Great Midwest Athletic Conference would begin sponsoring men's lacrosse in the 2017 season.

==== Women's lacrosse ====
The women's lacrosse program is coming off three consecutive Final Four appearances in the NCAA tournament.

The program began in 2003 and along with men's lacrosse, joined the Western Intercollegiate Lacrosse Association (WILA) in June 2011 for the 2011–12 academic year and 2012 lacrosse season. Prior to transitioning to the NCAA the program was a member in the Women's Collegiate Lacrosse Associates (WCLA) level at the WCLA Division I level because the NAIA does not sponsor championships in lacrosse. The team competed in the WCLA as a member of the Central Plains Women's Lacrosse League (CPWLL) from 2006 to 2008 and a member Women's Collegiate Lacrosse League (WCLL) from 2009 to 2010. Lindenwood won four straight league titles in 2007, 2008, 2009, and 2010. LU women's lacrosse lost 5–7 the program's first appearance in the national semifinals to Colorado State, with LU finishing 4th in nation. The Lady Lions Lacrosse team made the WCLA National Tournament again in 2011 and finished ranked 12th in the nation. The 2011 tournament was the last in the WCLA before the team moved to the NCAA level. In the team's first season as a member of the WILA, Lindenwood women's lacrosse recorded an 8–0 conference record to win the 2012 Western Intercollegiate Lacrosse Association Championship; the university's first NCAA Division II conference championship. In addition to the conference record the team recorded a 15–2 overall record and finished the season on an eleven-game win streak. The team repeated as WILA champions, with a 10–0 undefeated conference record and a 15–2 overall record in the 2013 season that saw the Lady Lions finished No. 15 in the final rankings.

Lindenwood women's lacrosse joined the ASUN Conference alongside men's lacrosse in July 2022.

=== Swimming and diving ===
In 2015–16, the men's team placed second at nationals, while the women finished ninth.

Lindenwood men's and women's swimming and diving teams have consistently been ranked as one of the top swimming and diving programs in the NAIA. LU Swimming and Diving finished top-10 in the NAIA Championships for six straight seasons from 2006 to 2011, ranking 4th in 2006 and 2007, 7th in 2008 and 2011, 8th in 2009, 10th in 2010. Men's swimming and diving won three-strait Liberal Arts Swimming and Diving Conference championships in 2010, 2011, and 2012; while the women's team won in 2006. In addition Lindenwood has hosted the NAIA Championships from 2009 to 2011. In April 2012, the Northern Sun Intercollegiate Conference (NSIC) announced it would add women's swimming and diving as the 18th sport offered by the conference beginning with the 2012–13 academic year. Lindenwood and fellow MIAA member Nebraska-Kearney join the conference as associate members and combine with four current NSIC members that field women's swimming and diving teams.

Upon moving to Division I in July 2022, the swimming & diving program joined the Summit League.

=== Men's volleyball ===
Lindenwood men's volleyball team competes as a Division I program at the NCAA National Collegiate level. Lindenwood competes primarily against Division II and Division I schools in the Midwestern Intercollegiate Volleyball Association (MIVA), which LU fully joined upon completing its NCAA transition.

Lindenwood began its men's volleyball team in 2000 and it competed in the NAIA as a member of the Mid-America Men's Volleyball Intercollegiate Conference (MAMVIC) During the program's tenure in the NAIA, LU reached the NAIA National Tournament every season and won nine MAMVIC conference championships in 11 seasons, including eight straight conference championships from 2002 to 2009. Lindenwood won the 2009 NAIA Men's Volleyball National Invitational Tournament with a 3–0 sweep of California Baptist. Although the program had played in previous championships matches, coming out as the runner-up, it was LU's first and only NAIA men's volleyball title. The Lions finished its final NAIA season ranked second in the NAIA coaches poll and lost in the 2011 national championship semifinals in Davenport, Iowa by a score of 2–3 over five sets against Saint Ambrose.

=== Men's wrestling ===
Men's wrestling was one of Lindenwood's most successful sports at the NAIA level having won five NAIA National Championships since 2000, including three-straight from 2007 to 2009. The 2010 season ended with a 7th-place finish at the NAIA National Championships. LU wrestling returned to the national championship in 2011, finishing as the runner-up to defending champion, Notre Dame (OH).

== Student life sports ==
The Lindenwood University Student Life Sports Department was created in 2010 in response to the university's move to the NCAA and oversees athletics programs that do not compete at the NCAA level. Most of these programs compete at the highest national club level for their respective sport. Women's wrestling had been part of the SLS program until being elevated to varsity status when that sport was added to the NCAA Emerging Sports for Women program in 2020. In women's ice hockey, Lindenwood continues to field a club-level team alongside its varsity team. Before launching its varsity men's ice hockey team, the school fielded two club-level teams, and its club-level program continues alongside its varsity program.

- Billiards (coed)
- Bowling (men's)
- Bowling (women's)
- Cheerleading (coed)
- Chess (coed)
- Cycling
- Dance
- Debate (coed)
- Esports (coed)
- Ice hockey (men's)
- Ice hockey (women's)
- Olympic weightlifting
- Roller hockey
- Rugby (men's)
- Rugby (women's)
- Shotgun sports (coed)
- Synchronized skating
- Synchronised swimming
- Table tennis (coed)
- Water polo (men's)
- Water polo (women's)

=== Roller hockey ===
The LU Roller Hockey team competes in National Collegiate Roller Hockey Association at the NCRHA Division I level. The team is a Division I member of the Great Plains Collegiate Inline Hockey League (GPCIHL). Lindenwood also fields a team in the B Division of the NCRHA and GPCIHL. Roller Hockey has been one of the most successful sports at Lindenwood, winning more national championships than any of the other sports. The DI team has won the NCRHA Division I National Championship in 2002, 2003, 2004, 2005, 2006, 2007, 2008, 2010, 2013, and 2014; while the B Division team has won the NCRHA B Division Championship in 2004, 2005, 2006, 2007, 2008, 2009, 2011, 2012, 2013, and 2014.

=== Men's rugby ===
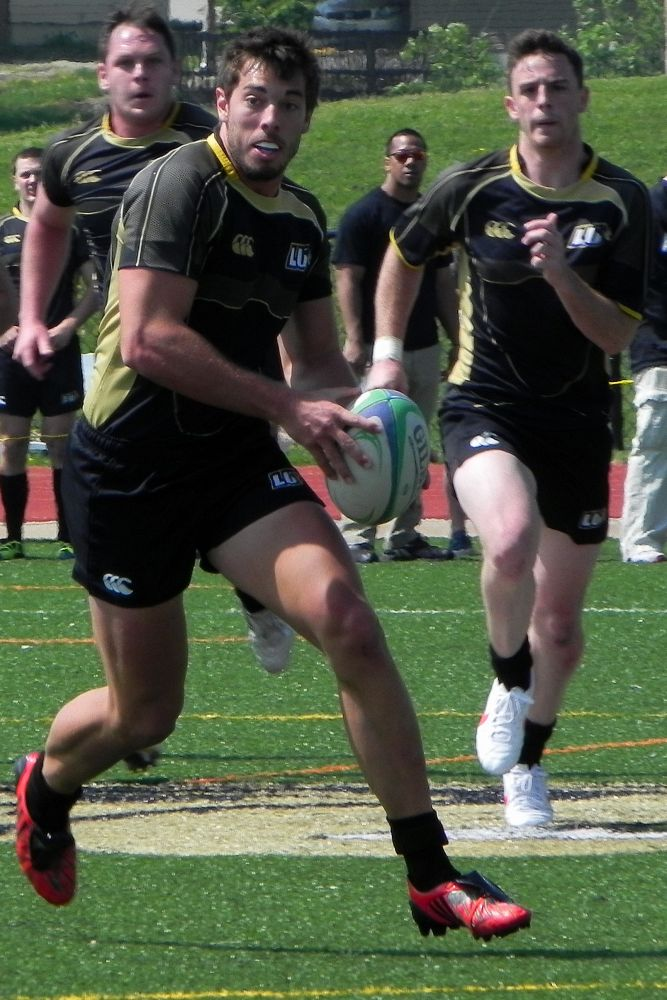
Lindenwood vs. Northern Colorado (March 2012).

Lindenwood announced in January 2011 the additions of men's and women's rugby to begin competition in the 2011–12 academic year. Lindenwood rugby was launched as one of the few varsity college rugby programs in the United States, and the program also provided scholarship funding for its student athletes. The team is coached by former USA Eagle player Ron Laszewski. The Lindenwood men's team won the 2012 USA Rugby Division II national championship. The team moved up to the Division I-AA level following the 2011–12 season, and competes in the Heart of America Rugby Conference.

Lindenwood began play in USA Rugby Division II level in the Missouri Rugby Football Union (Missouri RFU), and in its first season Lindenwood played a mixed schedule of both Division II conference games and some non-conference games against Division I schools. The team played its first game in program history on September 4, 2011, in an exhibition match against the St. Louis Bombers RFC, and won by a score of 21–12. The program earned its first official win against a college opponent by defeating Kansas 47–10 on September 10, 2011. The team finished the fall 2011 regular season 11–0 and won the Missouri RFU Championship. The team then went on a 4–0 run in the postseason to win the 2012 Division II West Region playoffs, the USA Rugby Midwest Regional Championship The Lions advanced to the USA Rugby DII Final Four and defeated #4 ranked Utah Valley 57–10 in the semifinals and #3 ranked Salisbury 50–12 to win the USA Rugby DII National Championship. Lindenwood became the first men's rugby program to win a collegiate national championship in its first year of existence.

The Lions were promoted to Division I-AA for the 2012–13 season. Lindenwood defeated Kansas State 98–5 in their first conference match as a member of the Heart of America. Lindenwood then clinched the 2012 Heart of America 7s tournament, defeating Missouri in the semifinals and Arkansas in the final 21–5, and earning automatic qualification to the 2012 USA Rugby Sevens Collegiate National Championships. Lindenwood finished the 2012–13 season as champions of the Heart of America conference, going undefeated in conference play. Lindenwood reached the finals of the USA Rugby Division I-AA national playoffs, losing to Central Florida. Lindenwood made headlines in 2018 when they defeated #1 ranked Saint Mary's 43–22 in the D1A quarterfinals to reach the semifinals.

=== Synchronized skating ===
Lindenwood's synchronized skating began in 2008 and is one of the newer sports at LU. The team began a competition season in 2010–11. It is Missouri's first and only collegiate synchronized skating team and one of the few varsity programs in the United States and is governed by the United States Figure Skating Association. In its first season in open college competition the Lady Lions Synchronized Skating Team won the first at the 37th annual Gateway Invitational, held in nearby Brentwood, Missouri.

== NCAA Division II championships ==
=== National championships ===
Lacrosse (W)	2021

=== MIAA conference championships ===
Mid-America Intercollegiate Athletics Association (MIAA) conference championships

Soccer (M)	2012 (Regular Season and MIAA Tournament), 2013 (Regular Season and MIAA Tournament)

=== Rocky Mountain Athletic Conference (RMAC) ===
Lacrosse (W)	2014

=== Lacrosse (WILA) conference championships ===
Western Intercollegiate Lacrosse Association (WILA) conference championships

Lacrosse (W)	2012, 2013

== NAIA championships ==
=== NAIA national championships ===
Soccer (M)	2004
Track and Field (Indoor, M)	1998, 2005, 2006
Track and Field (Outdoor, M)	2003
Volleyball (M)*	2009
Wrestling (M)	2002, 2005, 2007, 2008, 2009

*Men's Volleyball was a NAIA emerging sport

=== Heart of America Athletic Conference (HAAC) championships ===
Baseball	1999, 2008
Basketball (M)	2006, 2011
Basketball (W)	2000
Cross Country (M)	1997, 1998, 1999, 2005, 2007, 2008
Cross Country (W)	1996, 1997, 1998, 1999, 2004, 2008
Football	2004, 2007, 2009
Golf (M)	1997, 1999, 2001, 2002, 2003, 2004, 2005, 2006, 2007, 2008, 2009, 2010, 2011
Golf (W)	2000, 2001, 2002, 2003, 2004, 2005, 2006, 2007, 2008, 2009, 2010, 2011
Soccer (M)	1998, 1999, 2001, 2003
Soccer (W)	1996, 1997, 1999, 2000, 2002
Softball	1998, 2000, 2002
Spirit Squad	2002, 2004, 2005, 2006, 2007, 2009, 2010, 2011
Tennis (M)	2005
Tennis (W)	1999, 2007
Track and Field (Indoor, M)	1998, 1999, 2000, 2001, 2004, 2005, 2007, 2008, 2009
Track and Field (Indoor, W)	1997, 1998, 1999, 2000, 2001, 2002, 2003, 2004, 2005, 2007, 2009
Track and Field (Outdoor, M)	1998, 1999, 2000, 2001, 2004, 2005, 2006, 2007, 2008
Track and Field (Outdoor, W)	1997, 1998, 1999, 2001, 2002, 2003, 2005, 2008, 2011
Volleyball (W)	1999, 2002, 2003, 2005, 2006, 2007, 2008, 2010

=== American Midwest Conference (AMC) championships ===
Basketball (W)	1994, 1995, 1996
Soccer (M)	1995
Soccer (W)	1995
Softball	1995

=== Liberal Arts Conference championships ===
Swimming and Diving (M)	2010, 2011, 2012
Swimming and Diving (W)	2006

=== Volleyball MAMVIC championships ===
Mid-American Men's Volleyball Intercollegiate Conference (MAMVIC) championships

Volleyball (M)	2002, 2003, 2004, 2005, 2006, 2007, 2008, 2009, 2011

== Other sport championships ==
=== Other sport national championships ===
Bowling (M)	2005, 2014
Bowling (W)	2006
Cheer	Advanced Small Coed Open Division: 2021, Advanced Small Coed Division II: 2022; Advanced Coed Division II: 2015, 2017, 2018, 2019, 2022, 2023; Intermediate Small Coed Division II: 2016, 2018, 2021, 2022; NAIA Small Coed: 2011
Dance (Lion Line)	Hip Hop: 2008, 2009, 2010, 2012, 2013, 2021, 2023; Jazz: 2015, 2017, 2021
Dance (Lionettes)	Hip Hop: 2019, 2021, 2023; Jazz: 2017, 2018, 2021, 2022, 2023
Ice Hockey (M)	2009, 2010, 2016
Ice Hockey (W)	2006, 2008, 2009, 2010
Roller Hockey	2002, 2003, 2004, 2005, 2006, 2007, 2008, 2010, 2013, 2014
Shooting (Intercollegiate Clay Targets)	2004, 2005, 2006, 2007, 2008, 2009, 2010, 2011, 2012, 2013, 2014, 2015, 2016, 2017, 2018, 2020, 2024
Synchronized Swimming	2014
Table Tennis (W)	2010, 2012
Water Polo (M)	2006, 2007, 2008, 2014, 2015, 2016, 2018, 2019
Rugby (M)	15s: 2012 (DII); 7s: 2015, 2017, 2018, 2019 (USA Rugby), 2021 (NCR; no USAR 7s conducted)
Rugby (W)	15s: 2018, 2019, 2021, 2022 (spring), 2022 (fall), 2025; 7s: 2017, 2018, 2019, 2022 (USA Rugby/CRAA); 2021 (NCR; no USAR 7s conducted), 2022 (NCR)

=== Other sport conference championships ===
i. Collegiate Water Polo Association (CWPA) Division Championships:

Water Polo (M)	2005, 2006, 2008, 2009, 2010, 2012, 2013, 2014, 2015, 2016, 2017, 2018, 2019
Water Polo (W)	2007, 2008, 2011, 2012, 2013, 2014, 2018, 2019

ii. Central States Collegiate Hockey League (CSCHL) - 2009, 2010, 2011, 2012

iii. Great Plains Collegiate Inline Hockey League (GPCIHL) - 2004, 2005, 2006, 2007, 2008, 2009, 2010, 2011, 2012, 2013, 2014

ix. Central Collegiate Women's Hockey Association (CCWHA) - 2008, 2009, 2010, 2011

x. Central Plains Women's Lacrosse League (CPWLL) - 2005, 2007, 2008

xi. Great Rivers Lacrosse Conference (GRLC) - 2003, 2005, 2006, 2007, 2008, 2009, 2011

xiii. Heart of America Rugby Football Union (HOARFU) - 2013

xiv. Missouri Rugby Football Union (MRFU) - 2012

xv. Women's Collegiate Lacrosse League (WCLL) - 2009, 2010

== Directors' Cup results ==
Year	National rank	Level
2010–2011	4th Place	NAIA
2009–2010	2nd Place	NAIA
2008–2009	5th Place	NAIA
2007–2008	8th Place	NAIA
2006–2007	2nd Place	NAIA
2005–2006	2nd Place	NAIA
2004–2005	2nd Place	NAIA
2003–2004	3rd Place	NAIA
2002–2003	1st Place	NAIA
2001–2002	1st Place	NAIA
2000–2001	4th Place	NAIA
1999–2000	2nd Place	NAIA
1998–1999	4th Place	NAIA

== Facilities ==
=== Harlen C. Hunter Stadium ===
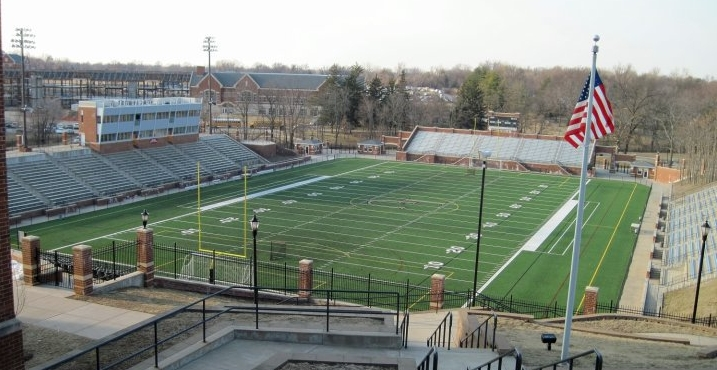
Hunter Stadium on the campus of Lindenwood University.

Harlen C. Hunter Stadium is an outdoor 7,450-seat stadium that serves as the home for Lindenwood football, men's and women's soccer, field hockey and both men's and women's lacrosse programs. Hunter Stadium was built in 1976 by the St. Louis Cardinals NFL Football Team as a training camp location. The stadium opened in 1979 and was renovated in 1988. The stadium is named after Dr. Harlen C. Hunter who founded the St. Louis Orthopedic Sports Medicine Clinic in Chesterfield in 1979, and made key monetary contributions for the upgrades of the playing surface in 1988.

After the 2004 season, the stadium was completely renovated including: end zone seating, a brand new two story press box with luxury boxes and a new concession area. In 2009, the playing surface at the facility was replaced with Enviroturf. The facility has hosted NAIA football playoff games in 2004, 2008 and 2009 and the NAIA Women's Soccer National Championships in 2001 and 2002.

=== Lindenwood Ice Arena ===
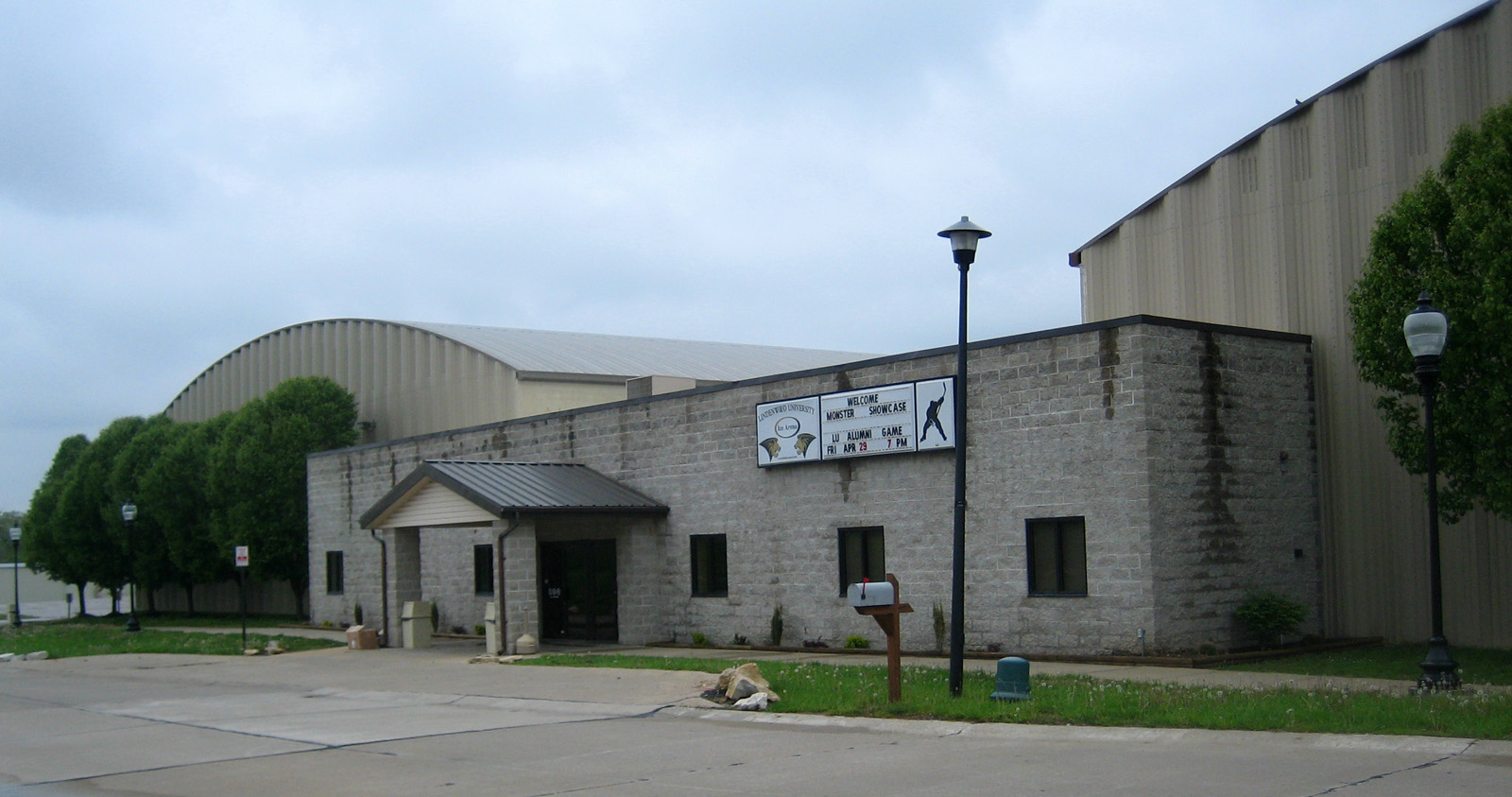
Lindenwood University Ice Arena

Before relocating to the newly built Centene Community Ice Center, Lindenwood was the only university in the state of Missouri that owned its own ice arena. The ice arena is located in nearby Wentzville, Missouri and was the home of both men's and women's ice hockey programs along with the synchronized skating team. The arena has been host to such events as the ACHA Women's Division I National Championships, and has also hosted the State Games of America's figure skating. The facility features two NHL-size (85' × 200') rinks, each with a capacity of 750 spectators. The ice arena is open year-round for public skating sessions, birthday parties, group outings and local high school hockey programs.

=== Lou Brock Sports Complex ===
The Lou Brock Sports Complex is the home for the Lindenwood baseball and softball programs. The complex was built in 2005 and has hosted NAIA regional tournaments along with the 2009 NAIA National Championship Opening Round. The complex is named former St. Louis Cardinals player, Lou Brock, who played for the Cardinals from 1964 to 1979.

=== Robert F. Hyland Performance Arena ===
The Arena was built in 1997 and is home to both men's and women's basketball, gymnastics, men's and women's volleyball, wrestling, table tennis, dance, and cheerleading. Tennis Courts are also attached to the Performance Arena for use by the men's and women's tennis programs. Hyland Arena seats 3,000 spectators plus and additional 270 in luxury box seating.

The facility also includes the athletic department offices. It was named after Robert Hyland who was the chairman of the Lindenwood board for many years and was also the CBS regional vice president and general manager of radio station KMOX in St. Louis, Missouri for four decades.

=== St. Peters Rec-Plex ===
The Rec-Plex is located in St. Peters, Missouri and is the home for the Lindenwood men's and women's swimming and diving teams, men's and women's water polo and diving and synchronized swimming. Built in 1994, the Rec-Plex opened to the U.S. Olympic Festival's aquatic events. In addition to hosting the Olympic Festival, the 2004 U.S. Olympic Diving Trials and the 2005, 2006 and 2009 NAIA Swimming and Diving Championships have been held at the Rec-Plex.

== See also ==
- List of NCAA Division I institutions
