= Arkansas State Red Wolves =

- University: Arkansas State University
- Nickname: Red Wolves
- NCAA: Division I (FBS)
- Conference: Sun Belt (primary); CUSA (bowling)
- Athletic director: Chris Pezman
- Location: Jonesboro, Arkansas
- Varsity teams: 16 (7 Men's, 9 Women's)
- Football stadium: Centennial Bank Stadium
- Basketball arena: First National Bank Arena
- Baseball stadium: Tomlinson Stadium–Kell Field
- Colors: Scarlet and black
- Mascot: Howl and Scarlet
- Website: astateredwolves.com

The Arkansas State Red Wolves are the athletic teams of Arkansas State University, competing at the National Collegiate Athletic Association (NCAA) Division I level. They are a member of the Sun Belt Conference in all sports except women's bowling, a sport not sponsored by that league. As of the 2023-24 NCAA bowling season, the bowling team competed in Conference USA, which absorbed the single-sport Southland Bowling League after the 2022–23 season.

== Sports sponsored ==
Men's sports	Women's sports
Baseball	Basketball
Basketball	Bowling
Cross country	Cross country
Football	Golf
Golf	Soccer
Track & field^{†}	Tennis
	Track & field^{1}
	Volleyball
^{1} – includes both indoor and outdoor

=== Baseball ===
Under head coach Keith Kessinger, ASU's baseball team usually finished in the middle of the pack in the SBC. ASU has claimed several victories over major teams in the last few years, including wins over the University of Mississippi, University of Kentucky, and Michigan State University. Arkansas State University director of athletics Dr. Dean Lee announced on July 1, 2008, that Tommy Raffo had been named head coach of the Red Wolves baseball team. Raffo was hired from Mississippi State after the controversial retirement of Ron Polk at MSU.

=== Basketball ===
Sun Belt Conference logo in Arkansas State's colors

In 1987 Arkansas State University received a bid to play in the National Invitation Tournament. The first game was against the University of Arkansas and was played in Barnhill Arena in Fayetteville, Arkansas. While the Indians led for the majority of the game, the Razorbacks eventually won in overtime. The game is the only meeting between the two universities in Men's Basketball.

In 1999 ASU went to the NCAA Tournament for the first time, losing to Utah in the first round.

On March 19, 2008, Arkansas State named John Brady as the university's 15th head basketball coach. Brady had previously coached at Louisiana State University, taking the Tigers to the Final Four of the NCAA Tournament in 2006. Brady is the only head basketball coach in the Sun Belt Conference with Final Four experience. Brady resigned following the 2015–2016 season.

=== Football ===
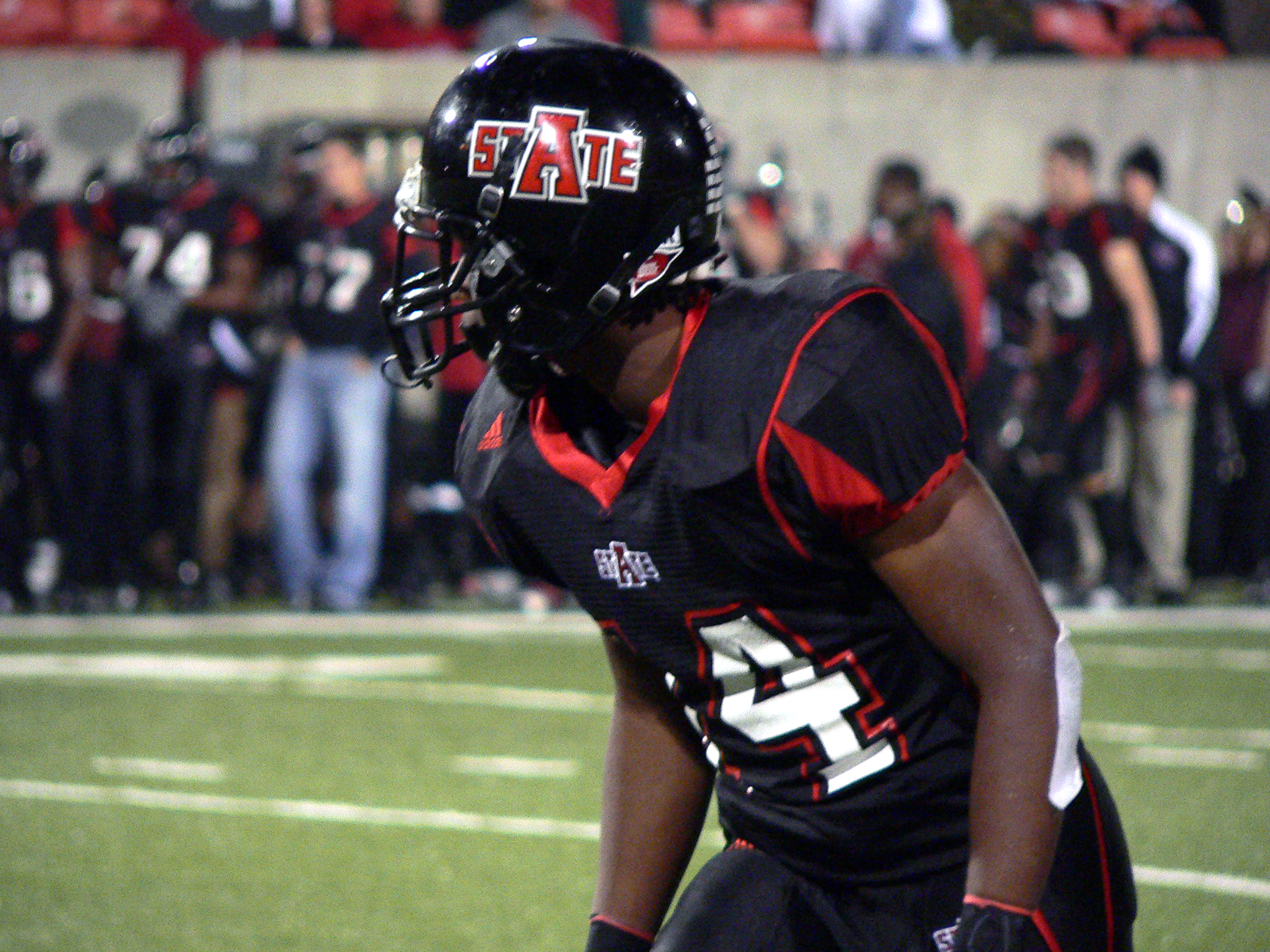
An Arkansas State football player wearing his home uniform

Arkansas State first fielded a football team in 1911. Since then the team has compiled six conference championships and one College Division (now NCAA Division II) football championship. The football program was briefly discontinued during the First and Second World Wars. In 1953, the Indians moved from the National Junior College Athletic Association (NJCAA) to the National Collegiate Athletic Association (NCAA), where they competed in the College Division. In 1975 they were promoted to NCAA Division I, and briefly played at the I-A level from 1978 to 1981. From 1982 to 1991, the Indians competed at the Division I-AA level before, again, being promoted to I-A, which is now known as Division I Football Bowl Subdivision (FBS).

In 1970, as a member of the Southland Conference, Arkansas State was crowned the NCAA College Division national champion after they defeated Central Missouri State (now known as University of Central Missouri) to complete an 11–0 season. It was the Indians' third consecutive bowl appearance. In 1975 the team's first year at the Division I level, Arkansas State recorded an 11–0 season as one of only two undefeated teams. As a member of the Southland Conference, Arkansas State did not receive an automatic bowl game bid and was not selected for post-season play. The Independence Bowl in Shreveport, Louisiana, was created as a direct result of the snub. In the 1980s, Arkansas State made four appearances in the Division I-AA (now Division I FCS) playoffs, including a 48–21 loss to Georgia Southern in the 1986 championship final.

During the 2005 football season, Arkansas State finished the regular season as Sun Belt Conference champions with a 6–5 record and played in the New Orleans Bowl, which they lost to Southern Mississippi. In 2011 the Red Wolves again finished as Sun Belt Conference champions with a 10–2 record and played in the GoDaddy.com Bowl, losing to Northern Illinois. In 2012 the Red Wolves finished as Sun Belt Conference champions for the 2nd year in a row with a 9–3 record and played in the GoDaddy.com Bowl against #25 Kent State, winning the game 17–13. In 2013 the Red Wolves again finished as Sun Belt Conference champions for the third straight year with a 7–5 regular season record and again played in the renamed GoDaddy Bowl, defeating Ball State 23–20.

The Red Wolves achieved football success in the 2010s despite frequent coaching turnover. Arkansas State has won three of the last five Sun Belt conference titles outright and are co-champions of another.

=== Notable non-varsity sports ===
==== Rugby ====
Arkansas State plays college rugby in the Mid-South conference of Division 1-A. The Red Wolves hired former ASU player Shaun Potgieter in 2015. Prior to that, they were led by head coach NeMani Delaibatiki between 2013 and 2014. From 2000 to 2007, Arkansas State reached the Division II finals three times under head coach Curt Huckaby.

Arkansas State was promoted to Division 1 and made the commitment to dedicate resources to its rugby program, offering the in-state tuition rate to qualifying out-of-state players. Consequently, Arkansas State has become one of the most successful college rugby programs in the country. The Red Wolves won the Mid-South Conference in 2011 and defeated St. Mary's in the national quarterfinals to reach the semifinals of the 2011 college rugby national championship, finishing the season ranked third in the nation. The Red Wolves defeated Army and St. Mary's in the 2012 national playoffs to reach the finals of the 2012 college rugby championship, losing to BYU 49–42 before 8,700 fans at Rio Tinto Stadium in Sandy, Utah. The Red Wolves won the Mid-South conference in 2013 and finished 3rd in the nation.

The Red Wolves have also been successful in rugby sevens. Arkansas State finished third at the 2011 USA Rugby Sevens Collegiate National Championships. Led by tournament MVP Zac Mizell, Arkansas State won the 2012 USA Rugby Sevens Collegiate National Championships, winning its pool by defeating rugby powerhouse Cal, and defeating Life University 21–7 in the finals. Arkansas State repeated in 2013, going 6–0 to once again win the USA Rugby Sevens Collegiate National Championships, this time behind tournament MVP Dylan Carrion. Arkansas State won the 2015 Las Vegas Invitational and, as of May 2015, Arkansas State carried a three-year unbeaten record in rugby sevens.

In February 2014 Arkansas State Rugby announced a partnership with the International Rugby Academy of New Zealand (IRANZ) allowing Arkansas State to promote itself as an international rugby academy and gain preferential access to IRANZ coaches, clinics, and mentors.

In July 2014 Arkansas State was invited to join University of Texas, University of Oklahoma, Notre Dame, BYU, Clemson, UCLA, Cal, Central Washington, Dartmouth, Air Force, Utah, and Navy at the top of college rugby as the 13th member of the now defunct Varsity Cup Championship.

== History ==
Early nicknames were "Aggies" in 1911 (sometimes called "Farmers"), "Gorillas" in 1925, and then "Warriors" in 1930.

=== Indians (1931–2008) ===
The name "Indians" officially became the school's athletic nickname in 1931. Arkansas State officially retired the Indian mascot on February 28, 2008, during the last home basketball game of the season. The school retained the Indians nickname for the remainder of the 2007–08 school year.

==== ASU Indian Family ====
The ASU Indian Family was a trio of mascots for Arkansas State University. The family consists of Chief Big Track (named for a prominent Osage chief), an unnamed brave and an unnamed princess. It was one of the few trios of athletics mascots for a university. The choice was in honor of the Osage Nation that inhabited the area until the 1800s.

The tradition, which had been dormant for years, was revived in 1996 by new athletic director Barry Dowd. During the process of reviving the tradition, Dowd sought permission and advice from the Cherokee and other local tribes on attire, dance and appearance. The various groups which restarted the tradition, including a former "Brave" and "Princess," were responsible for the creation of all outfits. The beadwork was done by the Cherokee as well as tribes from Texas.

"The Indian Family maintains a stately and dignified persona, befitting the Indian tribes which once lived in this area, as the official mascot of Arkansas State athletics and they will still have a major presence at our game day events," said Lee.

On June 18, 2007, Arkansas State's Mascot Review Committee unanimously approved a recommendation for Arkansas State to retire the "Indians" nickname and all Native American mascots and imagery. Chancellor Robert L. Potts promised a broad-based search to be guided by a Mascot Selection Steering Committee. The move for the name change comes in response to the NCAA's 2005 ban on ethnically or racially derogatory mascots at championship events.

The Family served their last performance as mascots of Arkansas State University during the last game of the 2008 men's basketball season, during a mascot retirement ceremony at halftime.

==== Red ====
In 2003, Arkansas State University decided to make a new mascot, named Red, created by ASU's director of athletic marketing, Andrea Scott. "The spirit character began as a project to design a character that looks friendly, is unique, and is not an animal," Andrea said. "I was looking for something out of the ordinary that's presence could elevate spirit at ball games." "Red absolutely will not replace Arkansas State's official mascot, the Indian Family," said Dr. Dean Lee, ASU director of athletics. "Red was named because that was how he was perceived by the marketing analysis and research groups, which were children and youth," said Dr. Dean Lee, ASU's athletic director.

He won many awards, such as:

- 2004 – Universal Cheerleader Association – won 3rd place as "best mascot"
- 2005 – Universal Cheerleader Association – won "best mascot"
- 2005 – University Cheerleading and Dance Team National Championship – won 6th place
- 2006 – Universal Cheerleader Association – won "best mascot"
- 2006 – College National Mascot Championship – won 2nd place

Lost only to Auburns "Aubie", and beat Michigan State University's "Sparty", University of Delaware's "YoUDee", University of Minnesota's "Goldy Gopher", University of Kentucky's "Wildcat", University of Tennessee's "Smoky", University of Iowa's "Herky the Hawk", University of Alabama's "Big Al", University of Wisconsin's "Bucky Badger".

- 2006 – Southern Living magazine – All-South football section
- 2007 – College National Mascot Championship – won 4th place
- He won over Tennessee's "Smokey", Colorado's "Chip", Delaware's "YoUDee", Alabama's "Big AL", Louisiana State's "Mike the Tiger", and Northern Iowa's "TC".

=== Red Wolves ===
On January 31, 2008, Arkansas State University's Mascot Selection Steering Committee decided to use the "Wolves" as a mascot. The Red Wolves was officially approved by the NCAA on March 7, 2008. The unveiling ceremony for the new Red Wolves logo was held March 13, 2008. The university planned on doing a slow phase out of the Indian imagery on the Arkansas State University campus. Dr. Dean Lee, the university's athletic director at the time, announced the Indian imagery would be phased out by importance, meaning the most visible sports would have the Red Wolves imagery first. Also, as part of the phaseout of the "Indians" nickname, the school immediately changed the name of its football stadium from Indian Stadium to ASU Stadium. In September 2012 the stadium's name was changed to Liberty Bank Stadium (now, as of 2015, known as Centennial Bank Stadium).

==== Red Wolves (Howl) ====
A panel selecting the new nickname first narrowed the list down to twelve finalists: A's, Black Wolves, Red Wolves, Diamonds, Express, Mallards, Mustangs, Red Dragons, Red Storm, Ridge Runners, Ridge Riders and Thunderbirds. A meeting was held on December 3, 2007, to review the list, which was narrowed in January 2008 to Red Wolves, Ridge Riders or Express Train.

On January 31, 2008, Arkansas State University's Mascot Selection Steering Committee decided to use the Red Wolves as a mascot. Arkansas State officially retired the Indian mascot on February 28, 2008, during the last home basketball game of the season. The roll-out ceremony for the new Red Wolves logo was held on March 13.

== Athletic bands ==
- Sound of the Natural State – perform during football games and events.
- The Howlers – perform during basketball games and various collegiate events.

== Notable sports figures ==
- Adrian Banks – American-Israeli professional basketball player
- Fred Barnett – former NFL wide receiver for the Philadelphia Eagles and Miami Dolphins
- Earl Bell – Olympic bronze medal pole vaulter and former world record holder
- Bill Bergey – NFL linebacker
- Ray Brown - retired NFL offensive lineman
- Maurice Carthon – NFL/USFL player and NFL coach
- Carlos Emmons- NFL linebacker who played for the Pittsburgh Steelers, Philadelphia Eagles and the New York Giants
- Brad Franchione – college football coach
- Bryan Hall – Defensive Tackle #95 for Baltimore Ravens
- Jeff Hartwig – US record holding pole vaulter
- Thomas Hill – Olympic silver medalist in 110-meter hurdles in 1972
- James Johnson – Most Valuable Player of 2007 CFL Grey Cup
- Tyrell Johnson – drafted with 43rd pick by the Minnesota Vikings in 2008 NFL Draft
- Ken Jones – 12-year NFL offensive lineman, primarily with the Buffalo Bills
- Al Joyner – Olympic gold medalist in the triple jump
- George Kell – broadcaster and Hall of Fame baseball player Detroit Tigers
- Larry Lacewell – former head coach of Arkansas State; former director of scouting for the Dallas Cowboys of the National Football League
- Cleo Lemon – quarterback for Toronto Argonauts
- Jerry Muckensturm – former linebacker for Chicago Bears
- Dan A. Sullivan – basketball player in early 1970s; member of the Arkansas House of Representatives for Craighead and Greene counties since 2015
- Kellie Suttle – two time Olympic pole vaulter and silver medalist at 2001 World Indoor Championships and 1999 Pan American Games
- Charley Thornton – sports figure
- Corey Williams – defensive tackle for Green Bay Packers and Cleveland Browns
- J.J. Montgomery - former ASU Basketball 2003–2005, International Basketball Player.
- Lennard Lopez - sports figure
- Demario Davis- ASU football LB 2007-2011, Linebacker for New York Jets, Cleveland Browns, and currently New Orleans Saints
