= USA Rugby Sevens Collegiate National Championships =

Annual rugby competition

USA Rugby Sevens Men's Collegiate National Championships
- Sport: Rugby sevens
- Founded: 2011
- First season: 2011
- No. of teams: 36
- Country: United States
- Most recent champion: Life University (3 titles)
- Most titles: Lindenwood (4 titles)
- Website: www.usarugby.org r7cc.rugby

The USA Rugby Sevens Collegiate National Championships is an annual competition among the top men's college rugby teams in the country to decide a national champion in rugby sevens. USA Rugby organized the championship to capitalize on the surge in popularity of rugby sevens following the 2009 announcement of the addition of rugby to the Summer Olympics. USA Rugby recognized that rugby sevens is growing in popularity, participation and interest. At the time of the foundation of the tournament, rugby was one of the fastest growing sports across college campuses. This tournament is a major contributor to the selection process for USA Rugby Olympic athletes.

== History ==
USA Rugby announced in September 2011 the creation of a new sevens tournament. The launch by USA Rugby had a few hiccups. USA Rugby did not officially announce the December 16–17, 2011 tournament and its dates until September 2011, and at that time USA Rugby had still not determined the location. Those mid-December dates were in the middle of exams for some schools. College Station, Texas, was ultimately announced as the venue in November. College Station lacks direct flight to many major cities, and this problem was compounded by the decision to hold the tournament over a Friday and Saturday, requiring students to miss both a Thursday and Friday. For these reasons, many colleges that qualified or were invited to the tournament—such as Penn State, UCLA, Utah, BYU, Boston College, Navy, LSU, Iowa, Dartmouth, Delaware, Cal, and Bowling Green—declined to participate.

The inaugural 2011 tournament was contested by 24 teams that qualified based on performance in qualifying tournaments throughout the fall of 2011. The 2011 tournament was won by Life University, defeating Central Washington 22–17 in overtime. Tim Stanfill of Central Washington was the tournament MVP, and Derek Patrick of Miami was the tournament's leading try scorer.

The 2012 tournament was more organized, with only one team - UCLA - declining to participate in the tournament. The 2012 tournament also saw increased airtime, with the entire tournament available live via webstream and some of the knockout rounds broadcast on ESPN3.

For the 2013 tournament, three teams—Cal, BYU, and UCLA—won bids but declined to participate.

The 2015 tournament was held in May — unlike previous tournaments which had been held in December. The tournament took place in Denver over the weekend of May 23–24, less than one week before the 2015 Collegiate Rugby Championship in Philadelphia. Once again, several top teams did not play: BYU, California, Life University, and UCLA.

== Men's results ==
Year	Location	Champion	Score	Runner up	Third	Fourth	Quarter-finalists	Reference
2011	College Station, TX	Life University	22–17	Central Washington	Arkansas State	Kutztown	Saint Mary's, Colorado, Tennessee, Cal Poly	
2012	College Station, TX	Arkansas State	21–7	Life University	Delaware	Saint Mary's	Navy, Central Washington, Texas A&M, Kutztown	
2013	Greensboro, NC	Arkansas State	32–12	Saint Mary's	Dartmouth	Central Washington	Life University (5th), Davenport (6th), Air Force, Lindenwood	
2014	Tournament moved from fall 2014 to spring 2015							
2015	Denver, CO	Lindenwood	28–10	Davenport	Central Washington	Utah	Saint Mary's (5th), Arizona St. (6th), American International College, San Diego State	
2016	Cary, NC	Saint Mary's	7–5	American International College	Davenport	Arizona St.	Central Washington, Notre Dame, Lindenwood, West Virginia	
2017	Glendale, CO	Lindenwood	26–5	Saint Mary's	Davenport	Utah	Ohio State, Bowling Green, Florida International, Grand Canyon	
2018	Glendale, CO	Lindenwood	26–12	Cal	Kutztown	Grand Canyon	Arizona, Arkansas, Wisconsin, Indiana	
2019	Tucson, AZ	Lindenwood	36–0	American International College	Davenport	Grand Canyon	Notre Dame, Arizona; Ohio State	
2020–21	Not held due to Covid-19 pandemic							
2022	Kennesaw, GA	Life University	24–19	Lindenwood	Davenport; Saint Mary's		Arizona, Central Washington, Cal Poly, UCLA	
2023	Houston, TX	Life University	28–17	Lindenwood	Army; Davenport		Penn State, Arizona, Grand Canyon, Central Washington	

== Championships ==
Collegiate National Championships by school
– 4 championships – 3 championships – 2 championships – 1 championship

Team	#	Years
Lindenwood	4	2015, 2017, 2018, 2019
Life	3	2011, 2022, 2023
Arkansas State	2	2012, 2013
Saint Mary's	1	2016

== Television Ratings ==
Year	TV Viewership	Ratings	Channel
2022	519,000	–	NBC*
*TV broadcast was taped.

== Players ==
Year	Tournament MVP	Leading Try Scorer		Leading Points Scorer		Ref.
2011	Tim Stanfill (Central Washington)	Derek Patrick (Miami, Ohio)	8			
2012	Zac Mizell (Arkansas State)					
2013	Dylan Carrion (Arkansas State)	Matthew Beeman (Miami, Ohio)	7			
2014	Tournament moved from fall 2014 to spring 2015					
2015	Mickey Batemen (Lindenwood)					
2016	Dylan Audsley (St Mary's)					
2017						
2018		Deion Mikesell (Lindenwood)	7	Nicholas Feakes	47	
2019						
2020						
2021						
2022						
2023	Orrin Bizer (Life)					

== Qualifying tournaments ==
The following rugby sevens tournaments, played throughout the fall season preceding the national championships, serve as the qualifying events for the national championships. The winner of each qualifying tournament earns an automatic berth in the national championships. The rest of the places in the national championships are awarded to at large bids chosen by a selection panel.

Legend

- 1st — Champions
- — Champions
- 2nd — Runners-up
- 3rd — Third place
- 4th — Fourth place

Tournament	2011	2012	2013
Allied 7s	Texas A&M	Texas A&M	Oklahoma
Atlantic Coast 7s	N.C. State	Virginia Tech	Navy
Battle in the Bay 7s	*	*	St. Mary's
Big 10 7s	Wisconsin	Wisconsin	Wisconsin
California 7s	St. Mary's	San Diego State	Cal Poly
East Coast 7s	Boston College	Northeastern	
Empire 7s	Navy	*	
Halloween 7s	Kutztown	*	
Heart of America 7s	*	Lindenwood	Arkansas
Ivy Rugby 7s	Dartmouth	Dartmouth	Dartmouth
MAC 7s	*	Davenport	
Midwest 7s	Miami, Ohio	*	
Northwest 7s	Central Washington	Central Washington	Central Washington
PAC 7s	Colorado	Cal	Cal
Pacific Western 7s	*	*	San Jose St.
South Independent 7s	Life University	Life University	Arkansas St.
Southwest 7s	*	Texas	Texas
Southeastern 7s	Tennessee	Texas A&M	Auburn
Cougar Invitational	Brigham Young	Air Force	Air Force

Notes:

- Team in italics declined to participate in the championship tournament or were not invited for team-specific issues.
- An asterisk indicates that the tournament was not held or was not an automatic qualifier that year.
- The Cougar Invitational was called the Rocky Mountain 7s in 2012 and the Mountain 7s in 2011.
- The Allied 7s was known as the Oklahoma 7s in 2011 prior to the formation of the Allied Rugby Conference.

== See also ==
- College rugby
- Collegiate Rugby Championship
- Intercollegiate sports team champions
- USA Rugby
