= Mid-America Geographical Union =

Mid-America Rugby Football Union Geographical Union
- Abbreviation: Mid-America GU
- Formation: 2013
- Region served: Arkansas; Illinois; Kansas; Missouri; Nebraska; Oklahoma, United States of America

The Mid-America Geographical Union (MAGU) is the Geographical Union (GU) for rugby union teams playing in Arkansas, Kansas, Missouri, Nebraska, Oklahoma, and parts of Illinois as a member of USA Rugby.

It was originally established in 1975 as the Western Rugby Football Union until becoming the Mid-America Geographical Union in 2013. It is a founding member of USA Rugby.

== Division 1 ==
- Kansas City Blues
- St. Louis Bombers

== Division 2 ==
=== Men's Clubs ===
- Arkansas Gryphons
- Kansas City Blues D2
- Kansas City Rugby Football Club (City)
- Omaha Goats
- St. Louis Bombers D2
- Tulsa Rugby
- Wichita Barbarians

=== Women's Clubs ===
- Columbia Black Sheep
- Kansas Bison
- Kansas City Jazz
- Omaha Goats
- Queen City Chaos
- St. Louis Sabres
- Wichita Valkyries

== Division 3 ==
- Belleville Rowdies
- Columbia Outlaws
- Mercenaries Rugby
- St. Louis Hornets
- St. Louis Royal Ramblers
- Springfield RFC
- Sunday Morning Rugby

== Division 4 ==
=== Heart of America Conference ===
- Kansas Jayhawks
- Lincoln
- Nodaway County
- Northland
- Topeka

=== Missouri Conference ===
- Belleville Rowdies
- Franklin County Crimson
- Kohlfeld Scorpions
- St. Louis Crusaders

== See also ==
- Missouri Rugby Football Union
- Heart of America (college rugby conference)
- USA Rugby
- Rugby union in the United States
