= Ron Laszewski =

American rugby union coach

Ron Laszewski is an American rugby union coach. Laszewski has been the head coach of the Lindenwood men's rugby team since it was formed 2011. Under Laszewski's leadership, Lindenwood won the Division 2 national championship in 2011 in the program's first year in existence, finished runner-up in the Division 1-AA national championship in 2012, and now plays in Division 1-A in the Mid/South conference. At Lindenwood, Laszewski has recruited players locally, nationally, and abroad, but Laszewski is adamant that his team will be “predominantly an American squad which is vital to the University’s long-term goals as we aim to do our part to help raise the level of rugby in this country.”

== Youth and playing career ==
Laszewski was Captain of the Western USA All-Star team for several seasons, and captained the Western USA representative team to its first ever National Championship. In 1985, Laszewski was one of several individuals who created the bylaws for the St. Louis Bombers. Laszewski was selected to the USA Eagles national rugby team, but he did not earn a cap for the national team. Laszewski also played Premier grade rugby in Auckland, New Zealand.

Laszewski holds a marketing degree from Southeast Missouri State University.

== Coaching ==
Laszewski has 20 years of rugby coaching experience, and possesses USA Rugby’s Advanced Coaching IRB Level 3 Certification. Laszewski has been on the staffs of the USA Rugby Under-19 National Team and USA Rugby Men's Select XV. He coached the Western USA Senior Men's All-Star Team. Laszewski was also head coach of the Missouri Rugby Union Under-19 squad for three seasons.

In club rugby, Laszewski coached the St. Louis Bombers to four Western USA championships and multiple national Sweet 16 and Elite 8 appearances in Division 1, plus three seasons as a head coach in the USA Rugby Super League. Under Laszewski's leadership, the Bombers were judged to be the best rugby club in St. Louis.

== See also ==
- Lindenwood Lions men's rugby
