= Sound of the Natural State =

Marching band of Arkansas State University

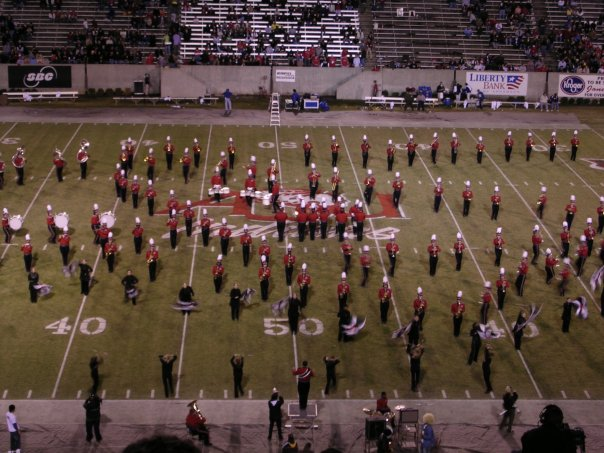
- School: Arkansas State University
- Location: Jonesboro, Arkansas
- Conference: Sun Belt
- Founded: 1909
- Director: Dr. Allegra Fisher
- Members: 200
- Fight song: "ASU Loyalty"

The Sound of the Natural State is the marching band of Arkansas State University, located in Jonesboro, Arkansas. The band is directed by Dr. Allegra Fisher.

== About ==
Described as "one of Arkansas State's greatest assets" by Arkansas State's former chancellor, Robert Potts, The SOUND is built on the long tradition of outstanding bands at Arkansas State. 'The Sound' is a premiere college marching band utilizing a corps style performance to produce a high energy precision show. Never to disappoint a crowd, the 'Sound of the Natural State' is well respected by colleges and high schools all across the country. Past Directors have included Mr. Donald Minx, Dr. Tom O'Connor, Ms. Pat Brumbaugh, Dr. Tom O'Neal, Mr. Ed Alexander, Dr. Sarah Labovitz, Dr. Polly Middleton, Dr. Steven Riley, Mr. Hal Cooper, and Mr. Bob Casey. The Director of Bands and Coordinator of Instrumental Activities, Arkansas State, is Dr. Nick Balla.

Throughout the past decade, under the talented leadership of those listed above, the band has enjoyed continued growth; both in numbers of artists participating and numbers of performances. Currently the SOUND performance schedule includes all home football games, several away games each season, as well as three exhibitions performances for area marching contests. The busy schedule fosters outstanding time management among the college students, representing every major in the STATE Course Catalog. The group rehearses Monday, Wednesday and Friday from 3:00 PM until 5:00 PM at the Marching Band Practice Facility on the Jonesboro campus. Enjoying outstanding support from the institution, a large number of SOUND musicians receive Band Performance Scholarships regardless of major.

== Organization ==
=== Winds and percussion ===
Currently, the instrumentation of Sound of the Natural State includes:

- Piccolos
- Flutes
- Clarinets
- Trumpets
- Alto Saxophones
- Tenor Saxophones
- Mellophones
- Trombones
- Euphonium (Baritones)
- Tubas (Sousaphones)
- Drumline
- Color guard (flag spinning)
- Majorette

== Traditions ==
=== Order of the Pack ===
Formerly known as "The Order of the Tribe", The Order of the Pack is an important gathering of current students, alumni, athletes, faculty, and administration to carry forward the history of the institution and teach the crowd the music, cheers and chants used to cheer on the ASU football team at the first home game of the season. The Sound of the Natural State is one of the most noticeable groups participating in The Order of the Pack, performing for the crowd the ASU Fight Song "ASU Loyalty", the ASU Alma Mater "Hail to ASU", and various pep tunes of the season.

=== Pregame ===
The football pregame performance at Arkansas State University is led by the Sound of the Natural State. The band performs a traditional pregame show that includes "Patriots on Parade", "The Star Spangled Banner", "Hail to ASU", and "ASU Loyalty".
