= Heart of America (college rugby) =

Sports league

Heart of America Conference
- Association: USA Rugby
- Sport: Rugby union
- Founded: 1975; 51 years ago
- Commissioner: Bill Sexton
- Organising body: College Rugby Association of America
- Division: Division I-AA
- No. of teams: 12
- Country: USA
- Region: Central USA
- Most recent champion: Iowa State (2024)
- Most titles: Iowa State (3 titles)

The Heart of America Rugby Football Union is a college rugby conference playing in Division I-AA, with membership composed mostly of Big 12, Big Ten and SEC schools (and many of these schools enjoying longstanding rivalries from the former Big Eight Conference). HOA organizes a league competition with the winner qualifying for the national playoffs, and every fall hosts a rugby sevens tournament with the winner qualifying for the national sevens championships.

Heart of America was a Division 2 conference until 2011, with Arkansas and Missouri ranked among the top teams in Division 2. In summer 2011, however, with the creation of the Premier College Division (Division I-A), several conferences including HOA decided to move up to Division I-AA.

The HOA conference is led by Conference Commissioner Bill Sexton of Truman State University.

The Conference is separated in a North - South Division split with each division having 6 schools.

== Current members ==
The current member schools (and the date they joined the conference) are:

Institution	Nickname	City	State	Founded	Affiliation	Enrollment	Joined HOA
Iowa State University	Cyclones	Ames	IA	1858	Big 12	29,887	2012
University of Arkansas	Razorbacks	Fayetteville	AR	1871	SEC	27,549	1980, 2021
University of Kansas	Jayhawks	Lawrence	KS	1865	Big 12	30,004	1980
University of Iowa	Hawkeyes	Iowa City	IA	1847	Big Ten	32,948	2019
Kansas State University	Wildcats	Manhattan	KS	1863	Big 12	23,588	1980
University of Missouri	Tigers	Columbia	MO	1839	SEC	34,255	1980
Oklahoma State University	Cowboys	Stillwater	OK	1890	Big 12	23,307	1980
University of Minnesota	Golden Gophers	Minneapolis	MN	1851	Big Ten	49,148	2021
University of Nebraska–Lincoln	Cornhuskers	Lincoln	NE	1869	Big Ten	25,820	2015
University Of Oklahoma							
Wayne State College							
University of Health Sciences and Pharmacy in St. Louis							

Member notes:

- University Of Oklahoma, Wayne State College and University of Health Sciences and Pharmacy in St. Louis (UHSP) all joined in the summer before the 2025-26 season
- Truman State Rugby Now Defunct
- University of Minnesota joined during the summer of 2021 after leaving the Big Ten Rugby Conference.
- University of Arkansas left the summer of 2016 for the Red River Rugby Conference, and then rejoined in the summer of 2021.
- Washington University in St. Louis joined briefly in 2016 from the Division 2 Gateway Conference, then went back to the Gateway following year.
- University of Nebraska–Lincoln joined 2015 after leaving the Big Ten Rugby Conference.
- Former member Lindenwood left the HOA conference during the summer of 2013 to play in the Division I-A Mid/South conference.
- Lindenwood joined HOA summer of 2012. Lindenwood was the Division 2 champion in 2011–12, and was promoted to Division I-AA for the 2012-13 year.
- Iowa State joined HOA summer of 2012. Iowa State played in the D1-AA Midwest conference until summer 2012, and joined HOA when the majority of the Midwest conference teams joined the newly formed Big Ten rugby conference.
- Former member Central Missouri left the conference in summer 2012 to play in the Division 2 Gateway Collegiate Rugby Conference.

== League results ==
Year	Champion	Runner up
2009-10	Arkansas	Central Missouri
2010-11	Arkansas	Central Missouri
2011-12	Missouri	Arkansas
2012-13	Lindenwood	Arkansas
2013-14	Missouri	Iowa State
2014-15	Missouri	Arkansas
2015-16	Arkansas	Missouri
2016-17	Arkansas	Missouri
2017-18	Missouri	Kansas
2018-19	Iowa State	Kansas
2021-22	Kansas	Minnesota
2022-23	Iowa State	Minnesota
2023-24	Iowa State	Kansas
2024-25	Iowa State	Iowa

== Heart of America Sevens ==
The HOA sevens tournament is played every fall among the eight members of the HOA conference and a limited number of additional Division 1 schools. The winner of the HOA sevens tournament qualifies for the annual USA Rugby sevens national championship.

The HOA sevens tournament is one of a number of college rugby tournaments that are tapping into the increased interest of rugby sevens while also targeting traditional collegiate conference rivalries. The HOA developed this competition due to the increasing popularity of rugby sevens throughout the United States, particularly since the 2009 announcement adding rugby sevens to the Summer Olympics, and in the wake of the success of the Collegiate Rugby Championship rugby sevens tournament broadcast live on NBC every year.

Date	Location	Champion	Score	Runner up	Third
Sep 24, 2011	Lawrence, KS	Oklahoma	???	Kansas State	Arkansas
Sep 22, 2012	Lawrence, KS	Lindenwood	21-5	Arkansas	Missouri
Spring 2019	Series	Iowa State	NA	Nebraska	Kansas
April 16, 2022	Iowa City, IA	Iowa State	21-19	Nebraska	Missouri
April 22, 2023	Columbia, MO	Iowa State	27-20	Nebraska	Minnesota
April 20, 2024	Iowa City, IA	Nebraska	41-0	Iowa State	Minnesota
April 19th, 2025	Colombia, MO	Iowa State	24-5	Minnesota	Nebraska
