= University of Northern Colorado rugby football club =

Northern Colorado
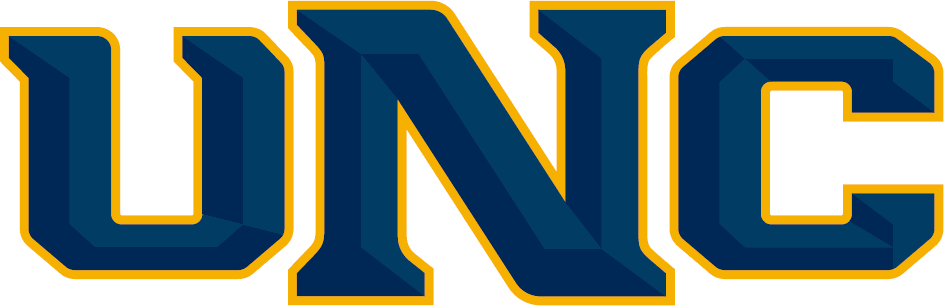
- Full name: University of Northern Colorado Rugby Football Club
- Nickname: Bears
- Founded: 1969; 56 years ago
- Location: Greeley, Colorado, U.S.
- Ground: Butler Hancock
- Coach: Mark Smith
- League: Eastern Rockies Rugby Football Union
Team kit

Official website
- www.unco.edu/campus-recreation/club-sports/mens_rugby.aspx

UNC Rugby is the rugby union team representing the University of Northern Colorado. It was established in 1969, and hosted the national championship in 1982. UNCRFC belongs to the Eastern Rockies Rugby Football Union, the West Rugby Football Union and USA Rugby, Division II.

== Honors ==
=== Season synopsis ===
- 1982: Hosted National Championships
- 1999: 3rd place in Division II
- 2000: 3rd place in Division II
- 2002–03: Division II Runner up
- 2003–04: 5th place in Division II
- 2004–05: Division II champions
- 2006: Division II runner up
- 2007: Fifth in Division II
- 2008: Fifth in Division II
- 2009: Eighth in Division II
- 2010: Third at Division II Western Rugby Championships

The spring of 2004, UNC competed in the national Elite Eights for the second straight year.

Due to UNC's finish in the previous year the winner of the WRFU received the 2nd seed at Elite Eights, this year being held on the campus of Vanderbilt University in Nashville, Tennessee. The quarterfinal put UNC up against perennial Division II power and winner of USA Rugby South, Arkansas State University. The Indians from Jonesboro were the better team on the day and handed UNC a 50–15 loss, putting UNC in the 5th place game the following day. Coming back from a 17–0 deficit UNC defeated the University of Pittsburgh 27–24 for 5th place in the nation. Rich Cortez from the University of Wyoming once again accompanied UNC and volunteered his time and money to help the club which was greatly appreciated.

=== 2004–05: Division II champions ===
The fall season began with the Jackalope tournament in Laramie, Wyoming. UNC opened up their season with a victory over Division 1 University of Colorado 17–14. They then lost to eventual Division 1 finalist University of Utah 32–6 and ended the weekend beating another Division 1 opponent University of New Mexico, 17–18. UNC waded through their ERRFU league play with little trouble. The highlight of the fall was when UNC hosted Division I University of Arizona who were on a mini-tour to play UNC and then the United States Air Force Academy. UNC put up a dominant performance and beat the Wildcats 22–8. With a 4th straight ERRFU title and 3 Division I defeats under their belts, the table had been set for the spring.

The spring kicked off with a home win against Division I University of Wyoming 14–12. UNC then hosted a small round robin tournament featuring the University of Colorado, Colorado State University and the University of Wyoming. UNC went 2–0 beating the University of Colorado 18–10 and Colorado State University 26–10. The next couple weeks saw UNC play some local men's clubs in order to stay fit for the WRFU collegiate championships. UNC was granted the hosting responsibilities for the 2005 WRFU collegiate championships including Division I Men, Division II Men and Division I Women. UNC's first opponent were Baylor University, whom UNC defeated the previous year and would so again 23–10. The semi-final put UNC against Texas Tech University which UNC ran away with 59–7. The final put UNC against ERRFU league rival Regis University. A tight match saw UNC come away with a 35–16 victory and a 3rd straight WRFU championship and 3rd straight appearance at the national Elite Eight tournament.

USA Rugby's Elite Eight tournament brings together the winners of the 7 territorial unions, plus the runner up of the host union. In 2005 the tournament was hosted by the University of California, Santa Cruz at a beautiful venue. The winner of the WRFU was given the 5th seed based on the performance of UNC the previous year. The quarter final put UNC against Southern California Rugby Football Union Champion, Point Loma University. A high scoring game saw UNC prevail 54–31. The semi-final was UNC versus Mid-Atlantic Rugby Football Union Champions, Georgetown University. In a very close, well played game, UNC earned a berth in the National Championship game with a 23–10 victory. Two weeks later UNC traveled to Stanford University's Stueber Rugby Field to take on Pacific Coast Rugby Football Union Champions, Humboldt State University for the 2005 National Championship. The game was played in front of 5,000 people and was televised on CSTV. After squandering a 19–0 lead, UNC came back to win 24–22 and take home the 2005 National Championship.
