= 2012 USA Rugby Men's College 7s National Championship =

- Host nation: United States
- Date: 30 November 2012 – 1 December 2012

Cup
- Champion: Arkansas State
- Runner-up: Life

Plate
- Winner: Kutztown
- Runner-up: Navy

Bowl
- Winner: Dartmouth
- Runner-up: San Diego State

Shield
- Winner: Davenport
- Runner-up: Western Washington

Tournament details
- Matches played: 64

The 2012 USA Rugby Men's College 7s National Championship was a seven-a-side rugby union tournament. The competition was held from 30 November – 1 December at Texas A&M University in College Station, Texas and featured 24 college/university teams from across the United States.

== Teams ==
The following teams participated:

- Air Force
- Arkansas State
- Bowling Green
- California
- Cal Poly SLO
- Central Washington
- Colorado State
- Dartmouth
- Davenport
- Delaware
- Kutztown
- Life
- Lindenwood
- Middlebury
- Navy
- North Carolina State
- Northeastern
- St. Mary’s
- San Diego State
- Texas
- Texas &M
- Virginia
- Western Washington
- Wisconsin

== Pool stage ==
Key to colours in group tables
Teams that advanced to the Cup Quarter Final

=== Pool A ===
Team	GP	W	L	T	PF	PA	PD	PTS
Life	3	3	0	0	103	17	+86	9
Northeastern	3	2	1	0	59	48	+11	7
Wisconsin	3	1	2	0	48	58	-10	5
Colorado State	3	0	3	0	17	104	−-87	3

Match	Time	Field	Team 1	Score	Team 2
1	9:20 AM	1	Life	31 – 7	Northeastern
3	9:40 AM	1	Wisconsin	26 – 12	Colorado State
14	1:00 PM	2	Life	50 – 0	Colorado State
16	1:20 PM	2	Wisconsin	12 – 24	Northeastern
25	4:40 PM	1	Life	22 – 10	Wisconsin
26	4:40 PM	2	Colorado State	5 – 28	Northeastern

=== Pool B ===
Team	GP	W	L	T	PF	PA	PD	PTS
Arkansas State	3	3	0	0	79	12	+67	9
California	3	2	1	0	62	22	+40	7
Middlebury	3	1	2	0	19	74	-55	5
North Carolina State	3	0	3	0	24	76	-52	3

Match	Time	Field	Team 1	Score	Team 2
2	9:20 AM	2	California	29 – 0	Middlebury
4	9:40 AM	2	Arkansas State	31 – 5	NC State
13	1:00 PM	1	California	26 – 12	NC State
15	1:00 PM	1	Arkansas State	38 – 0	Middlebury
27	5:00 PM	1	California	7 – 10	Arkansas State
28	5:00 PM	2	NC State	7 – 19	Middlebury

=== Pool C ===
Team	GP	W	L	T	PF	PA	PD	PTS
Central Washington	3	3	0	0	81	17	+64	9
Kutztown	3	2	1	0	95	36	+59	7
Texas	3	1	2	0	34	52	-18	5
Virginia	3	0	3	0	5	110	-105	3

Match	Time	Field	Team 1	Score	Team 2
5	10:00 AM	1	Central Washington	19 – 0	Texas
7	10:20 AM	1	Kutztown	50 – 0	Virginia
18	1:40 PM	2	Central Washington	36 – 0	Virginia
20	2:00 PM	2	Kutztown	28 – 10	Texas
29	5:20 PM	1	Central Washington	26 – 17	Kutztown
30	5:20 PM	2	Virginia	5 – 24	Texas

=== Pool D ===
Team	GP	W	L	T	PF	PA	PD	PTS
Navy	3	3	0	0	59	36	+23	9
Dartmouth	3	2	1	0	62	43	+19	7
Cal Poly SLO	3	1	2	0	48	43	+5	5
Air Force	3	0	3	0	24	71	-47	3

Match	Time	Field	Team 1	Score	Team 2
6	10:00 AM	2	Dartmouth	10 – 21	Navy
8	10:20 AM	2	Cal Poly SLO	19 – 5	Air Force
17	1:40 PM	1	Dartmouth	40 – 12	Air Force
19	2:00 PM	1	Cal Poly SLO	19 – 26	Navy
31	5:40 PM	1	Dartmouth	12 – 10	Cal Poly SLO
32	5:40 PM	2	Air Force	7 – 12	Navy

=== Pool E ===
Team	GP	W	L	T	PF	PA	PD	PTS
St. Mary's	3	3	0	0	55	34	+21	9
Texas A&M	3	2	1	0	74	24	+50	7
Western Washington	3	1	2	0	36	71	-35	5
Bowling Green	3	0	3	0	33	69	-36	3

Match	Time	Field	Team 1	Score	Team 2
9	10:40 AM	1	Texas A&M	31 – 7	Bowling Green
11	11:00 PM	1	St. Mary's	19 – 7	Western Wash.
22	2:20 PM	2	Texas A&M	38 – 0	Western Wash.
24	2:40 PM	2	St. Mary's	19 – 12	Bowling Green
33	6:00 PM	1	Texas A&M	5 – 17	St. Mary's
34	6:00 PM	2	Western Wash.	19 – 14	Bowling Green

=== Pool F ===
Team	GP	W	L	T	PF	PA	PD	PTS
Delaware	3	2	1	0	44	12	+32	7
San Diego State	3	2	1	0	43	40	+3	7
Lindenwood	3	2	1	0	35	46	-11	7
Davenport	3	0	3	0	26	50	-24	3

Match	Time	Field	Team 1	Score	Team 2
10	10:40 AM	2	San Diego State	12 – 21	Lindenwood
12	11:00 AM	2	Davenport	0 – 17	Delaware
21	2:20 PM	1	San Diego State	12 – 5	Delaware
23	2:40 PM	1	Davenport	12 – 14	Lindenwood
35	6:20 PM	1	San Diego State	19 – 14	Davenport
36	6:20 PM	2	Delaware	22 – 0	Lindenwood

== Knockout stage ==
=== Shield ===
Quarter-finals
Match 37 – 8:00 AM – Field 2 (USAR TV)
Western Washington	15
Virginia	5
Match 38 – 8:20 AM – Field 2 (USAR TV)
Bowling Green	21
Air Force	14
Match 39 – 8:40 AM – Field 2 (USAR TV)
Middlebury	19
Colorado State	7
Match 40 – 9:00 AM – Field 2 (USAR TV)
Davenport	21
North Carolina State	0

Semi-finals
Match 49 – 12:00 PM – Field 2 (USAR TV)
Western Washington	27
Bowling Green	5
Match 51 – 12:20 PM – Field 2 (USAR TV)
Middlebury	7
Davenport	14

Final
Match 57 – 3:00 PM – Field 1 (ESPN3)
Western Washington	17
Davenport	27

=== Bowl ===
Quarter-finals
Match 42 – 9:20 AM – Field 2 (USAR TV)
California	19
Texas	7
Match 44 – 9:40 AM – Field 2 (USAR TV)
San Diego State	33
Lindenwood	7
Match 46 – 10:00 AM – Field 2 (USAR TV)
Dartmouth	14
Wisconsin	5
Match 48 – 10:20 AM – Field 2 (USAR TV)
Northeastern	0
Cal Poly SLO	12

Semi-finals
Match 53 – 12:40 PM – Field 2 (USAR TV)
California	0
San Diego State	7
Match 55 – 1:00 PM – Field 2 (USAR TV)
Dartmouth	24
Cal Poly SLO	0

Final
Match 59 – 3:20 PM – Field 1 (ESPN3)
San Diego State	15
Dartmouth	21

=== Plate ===
Quarter-finals
Match 41 – 9:20 AM – Field 1 (USAR TV)
Life	31
Texas A&M	5
Match 43 – 9:40 AM – Field 1 (USAR TV)
Navy	10
St. Mary’s	20
Match 45 – 10:00 AM – Field 1 (USAR TV)
Arkansas State	31
Kutztown	12
Match 47 – 10:20 AM – Field 1 (USAR TV)
Central Washington	12
Delaware	21

Semi-finals
Match 50 – 12:20 PM – Field 1 (ESPN3)
Texas A&M	17
Navy	21
Match 52 – 12:40 PM – Field 1 (ESPN3)
Kutztown	14
Central Washington	10

Final
Match 61 – 3:40 PM – Field 1 (ESPN3)
Navy	12
Kutztown	38

=== Cup ===
Quarter-finals
Match 41 – 9:20 AM – Field 1 (USAR TV)
Life	31
Texas A&M	5
Match 43 – 9:40 AM – Field 1 (USAR TV)
Navy	10
St. Mary’s	20
Match 45 – 10:00 AM – Field 1 (USAR TV)
Arkansas State	31
Kutztown	12
Match 47 – 10:20 AM – Field 1 (USAR TV)
Central Washington	12
Delaware	21

Semi-finals
Match 54 – 1:00 PM – Field 1 (ESPN3)
Life	33
St. Mary’s	0
Match 56 – 1:20 PM – Field 1 (ESPN3)
Arkansas State	45
Delaware	0

Final
Match 64 – 5:30 PM – Field 1 (ESPN3)
Life	7
Arkansas State	21

== Awards ==
The Tournament MVP was Zac Mizell from Arkansas State University.

The USA Rugby All-Tournament Team consisted of:

- Pat Blair (Central Washington)
- Garrett Brewer (St. Mary's)
- Colton Cariaga (Life)
- JP Eloff (Davenport)
- Morgan Findlay (Lindenwood)
- Dean Gericke (Arkansas State)
- Kelly Harris (St. Mary's)
- Madison Hughes (Dartmouth)
- Jimmy Kowalski (Delaware)
- Dominic Mauer (Bowling Green)
- Zac Mizell (Arkansas State)
- Shaun Potgieter (Arkansas State)
