= Saint Mary's Gaels =

Collegiate sports club in the United States

- University: Saint Mary's College of California
- Nickname: Gaels
- NCAA: Division I
- Conference: West Coast Conference; Mountain Pacific Sports Federation (swimming & diving); Golden Coast Conference (women's water polo)
- Athletic director: Mike Matoso
- Location: Moraga, California
- Varsity teams: 18
- Football stadium: Saint Mary's Stadium
- Basketball arena: University Credit Union Pavilion
- Baseball stadium: Louis Guisto Field
- Softball stadium: Cottrell Field
- Volleyball arena: University Credit Union Pavilion
- Colors: Navy, red, and silver
- Mascot: Gideon
- Fight song: "On To Victory"
- Website: www.smcgaels.com

The Saint Mary's Gaels are the athletic teams that compete at Saint Mary's College of California in Moraga, California. The nickname applies to the college's intercollegiate NCAA Division I teams and to the school's club sports teams. Most varsity teams compete in the West Coast Conference. On September 11, 2025, SF Gate announced the school would add water polo and swimming and diving for both men and women effective for the 2026-27 school year.

== The Gaels name ==
From the Gaels website: "The Gaels are an ethno-linguistic group which spread from Ireland to Scotland and the Isle of Man. Their language is of the Gaelic (Goidelic) family, a division of Insular Celtic languages. The word in English was adopted in 1810 from Scottish Gaelic Gaidheal (compare Irish Gaedhealg and Old Irish Goídeleg) to designate a Highlander (OED). Gael or Goídeleg was first used as a collective term to describe people from Ireland; it is thought to have come from Welsh Gwyddel (Old Welsh Goídel), originally "raider", now "Irish person". Many people who do not speak Gaelic consider themselves to be 'Gaels' in a broader sense because of their ancestry and heritage."

The nickname was given to the school's football team (now discontinued) in 1926 by Pat Frayne, a writer for the now defunct San Francisco Call-Bulletin. The school's previous nickname was the Saints, although the baseball team was known as the Phoenix until the 1940s.

== Sports sponsored ==
Men's sports	Women's sports
Baseball	Basketball
Basketball	Beach volleyball
Cross country	Cross country
Golf	Rowing
Soccer	Soccer
Swimming and Diving (adding in 2026-27)	Softball
Tennis	Swimming and Diving (adding in 2026-27)
Track and field^{†}	Tennis
Water Polo (adding in 2026-27)	Track and field^{†}
	Volleyball
	Water Polo (adding in 2026-27)
† – Track and field includes both indoor and outdoor

=== Men's basketball ===
The men's basketball team has become recognized nationally as one of the top mid-major programs in the country, appearing in eight NCAA tournaments since 2005 and making appearances in both the Associated Press and ESPN Top 25 polls. The team received at-large bids to the NCAA tournament in 2005 and 2008 but lost in the first round. In 2008–2009, the team got off to a strong start and at one time had the longest active winning streak in the nation before an injury to star guard Patty Mills, who was their leading scorer at the time. Mills came back in time for the West Coast Conference tournament, but after a loss to Gonzaga in the WCC tournament finals, the team was not selected for the NCAA tournament.

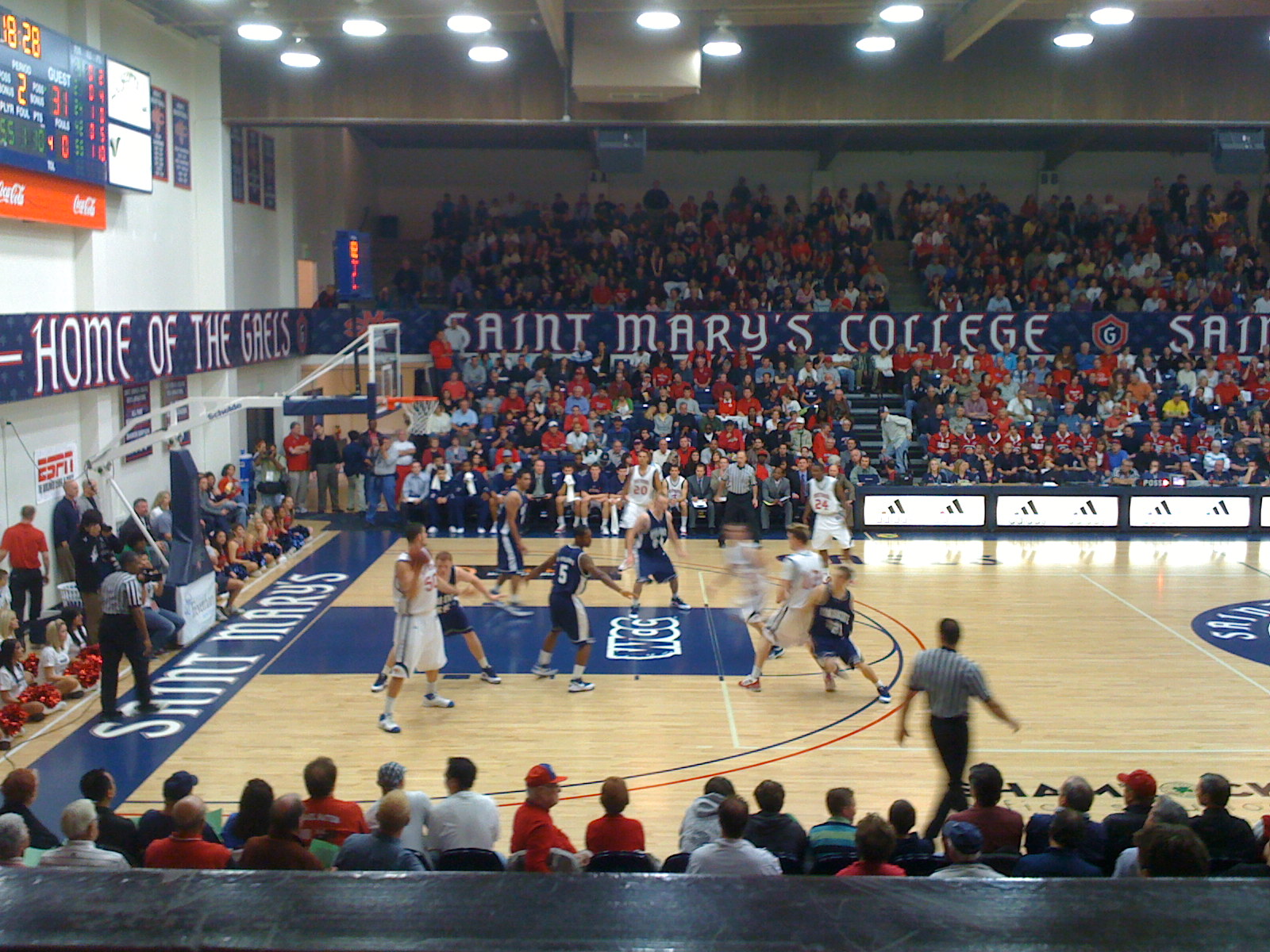
The Saint Mary's men's basketball team playing in McKeon Pavilion in 2009

In March 2010, the Gaels received an automatic bid to the 2010 NCAA tournament, after defeating Gonzaga in the championship game of the WCC Tournament, the Gaels' second WCC tournament title since 1987. They then won their first NCAA Tournament game since 1959, defeating the Richmond Spiders. On March 20, 2010, the Gaels, led by Omar Samhan's 32 points, defeated #2 seed Villanova 75–68 to advance to the Sweet Sixteen, where they would fall to three seed and AP #19 Baylor to end their season 28–6.

The Gaels shared the regular season WCC title with Gonzaga in 2011, but lost to Gonzaga in the WCC tournament and were not invited to the NCAA tournament. In 2012, Saint Mary's claimed both the regular season WCC title and the tournament title and received a seven seed in the NCAA tournament but lost to #10 seed Purdue in the first round. The Gaels finished second in the WCC in the 2012–13 season and received an at-large bid to the NCAA tournament, defeating Middle Tennessee in a "First Four" matchup before losing in the second round to Memphis.

During the 2012–13 season, the NCAA sanctioned the men's basketball program for recruiting violations stemming primarily from a former assistant coach and his attempts to recruit players from France. Penalties included a reduction in scholarships, four years probation and a five-game suspension for head coach Randy Bennett.

Past alumni from Saint Mary's who currently or recently played in the NBA include Jock Landale, Patty Mills and Matthew Dellavedova.

A Gaels basketball alumnus who became more notable outside the sport is two-time Oscar-winning actor Mahershala Ali, who played under his original name of Mahershalalhashbaz Gilmore.

=== Football ===
The Saint Mary's Gaels football team competed in the NCAA as a Division II Independent football program. The school's first football team was fielded in 1892, finishing in 2004.

== National championships ==
=== Team ===
Sport	Association	Division	Year	Opponent/Runner-up	Score
Women's soccer (2)	NAIA	Single	1984	Cardinal Newman (MO)	4–0
Women's soccer (2)	NAIA	Single	1986	Berry	3–0

== Club sports ==
SMC also sponsors more than a dozen club sports.

=== Men's rugby ===
The men's rugby team, the oldest athletic club at the school, plays college rugby in Division 1-A in the California conference. The team has enjoyed a rise in the past few years, revitalized with a new coaching staff and increasing alumni support. The Gaels finished the season ranked among the top ten college rugby teams in the country for three consecutive years. Head coach Tim O'Brien was named coach of the year by American Rugby News following the 2006–07 season.

The Gaels had a strong season in 2007-08, reaching the semifinals of the USA Rugby National Championship losing to Cal 41–31, and finished the 2007–08 season ranked #2 in the nation for Division 1. The Gaels were led that season by Kevin Swiryn, who went on enjoy a rugby career with the U.S. national team.

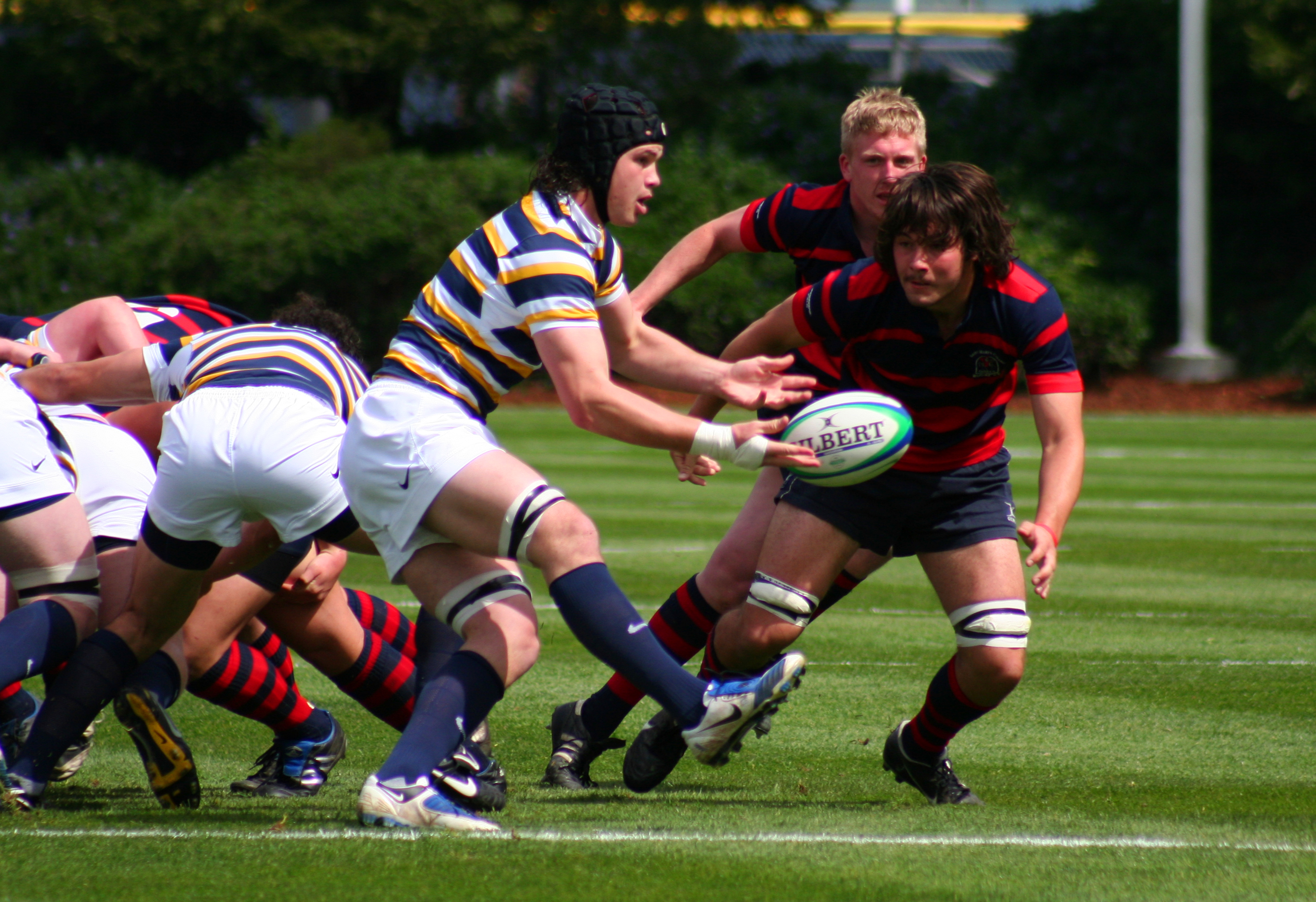
Scene from a St. Mary's (red and blue jersey) v Cal match in March 2010

The Gaels finished the 2010–11 season ranked fifth in the nation following a trip to the national semifinals. The 2011-12 season saw St. Mary's achieve a perfect record en route to winning the Pacific Coast Conference championship, a non-conference 20–18 victory over defending national champion Cal, and defeating Utah 24–15 in the national quarterfinals to advance to the national semifinals before losing to Arkansas State.

The Gaels were successful in the 2012–13 season, again posting an undefeated conference record to win the California Conference. In the 2013 spring playoffs, St. Mary's defeated Colorado in the quarterfinals and Cal Poly in the semifinals, before losing 16–14 in the national championship match to Life University. In 2014, St. Mary's defeated powerhouses BYU and Cal during the regular season. In the 2014 D1A final, the Gaels defeated Life University 21–6 to win the Division 1-A college rugby championship, led by finals MVP Cooper Maloney, for the first national title in the program's history, and finished the season ranked as the #1 team in college rugby. In 2015, St. Mary's repeated as Division 1-A champion, again defeating Life University in the final 30–24 behind the efforts of MVP center Dylan Audesley.

The Gaels have also been successful in rugby sevens. The Gaels reached the quarterfinals of the 2011 USA Rugby Sevens Collegiate National Championships. St. Mary's won the 2012 West Coast 7s tournament, with a semifinal 17–12 win over favored Cal, and a win in the final over Cal Poly 35–19. The Gaels finished third at the 2012 California 7s. The Gaels participated at the 2012 USA Rugby Sevens Collegiate National Championships, defeating Texas A&M and Navy to reach the semifinals. The Gaels also participated at the 2013 USA Rugby Sevens Collegiate National Championships, finishing second.
