= Missouri Rugby Football Union =

Mid-America Geographical Union (MAGU)

The Missouri Rugby Union (MRFU) is the Local Area Union (LAU) for rugby union teams in Missouri and parts of Illinois. MRFU is part of the Mid-America Geographical Union (MAGU), which is of several Geographical Unions (GU's) that comprise USA Rugby.

== History ==
Early History. The honor of creating the Missouri Rugby Football Union belongs largely to Harry Langenberg. In 1933, Harry arrived back in St. Louis after attending Princeton University, where he was introduced to rugby. Harry not only played rugby, but also served as an assistant coach for a school club. In St. Louis, Harry joined forces with Edmond St. John Hoogewerf and Hugo Walther to form the Missouri Rugby Football Union.

Shortly after the formation of the Missouri Rugby Football Union, Harry founded the first club to become a member, the Ramblers. The Missouri Rugby Football Union is now one of the oldest of the 39 territorial unions operating within the USA Rugby Union, and one of the oldest sports organizations in the St. Louis area. The Ramblers Rugby Club is the second oldest surviving independent rugby club in the United States. The Ramblers were Missouri Rugby Football Union champions in 1947.

Grand Rec. Grand Rec was the first team allowed to keep the Missouri Rugby Football Union trophy for winning the championship three years in a row, in 1950. During its last years a younger team, the Grand Rec Juniors, was formed and also played. After winning permanent possession of the championship trophy, Grand Rec disbanded, and the juniors became just Grand Rec. Paul Birchfield from Grand Rec became coach of the juniors, now Grand Rec, and coached them to a championship. Bill "Terrible" Turk was the only Grand Rec player who played on as a member of the juniors, now just Grand Rec. Among Grand Rec's original team was Rudy Bukich (see Wikipedia entry). All the Missouri Rugby Football Union games during this time were played on the pitch in Forest Park, St Louis, Missouri. During the original Grand Rec's reign, the champion of the Missouri Rugby Football Union played Princeton for the Missouri Challenge Cup. This series was discontinued when Princeton returned the cup, after having won the game the previous year, saying the scheduled date interfered with studying for exams.

== Gateway Ruggerfest ==
The MRFU has hosted the Gateway Ruggerfest Tournament annually since 1948. The tournament was traditionally scheduled on Easter weekend in Forest Park and was known as the Easter Ruggerfest. In recent years, the tournament has been scheduled the week after Easter and has outgrown the capacity of Forest Park. The 62nd annual Ruggerfest was held on April 10–11, 2010 at Creve Coeur Lake Memorial Park in St. Louis County.

== Senior Clubs ==
=== Men's ===
Men's Division II

- St. Louis Bombers

Men's Division III

- Kohlfeld Scorpions
- St. Louis Hornets Rugby Club
- Sunday Morning
- St. Louis Royal Ramblers
- St. Louis Bombers Rugby
- Franklin County Crimson Rugby
- Belleville Rowdies Rugby

=== Women's ===
Women's Division I

- St. Louis Sabres

== College Clubs ==
=== Men ===
Collegiate Division I-A

- Lindenwood University

Collegiate Division I-AA

- University of Missouri

Collegiate Division II

- Missouri University of Science and Technology
- Principia College
- Saint Louis University
- Southeast Missouri State University
- Washington University in St. Louis
- Northwest Missouri State University

=== Women's ===
St. Louis Sabres Women's Rugby

== High School clubs ==
Single School Programs

- Christian Brothers College High School (CBC)
- Saint Louis University High School
- Liberty North High school
- Liberty High school
- Eureka High School

Multi-School Programs

- Kansas City Junior Blues
- Winnetonka Rugby
- Park Hill United
- Columbia Bandits
- Nodaway County R.F.C Maryville

High School Girls

St. Louis Sirens

Nodaway County High School Rugby Club
