= Life University =

Private university in Marietta, Georgia, U.S.

- Former names: Life Chiropractic College (1976–1989); Life College (1989–1996)
- Type: Private university
- Established: 1974; 52 years ago
- President: Brian McAulay
- Academic staff: 183
- Students: 2,692
- Undergraduates: 718
- Postgraduates: 1,974
- Location: Marietta, Georgia, United States; 33.9325°N 84.5145°W
- Colors: Green, light green & yellow
- Nickname: Running Eagles
- Sporting affiliations: NAIA – SSAC
- Website: life.edu
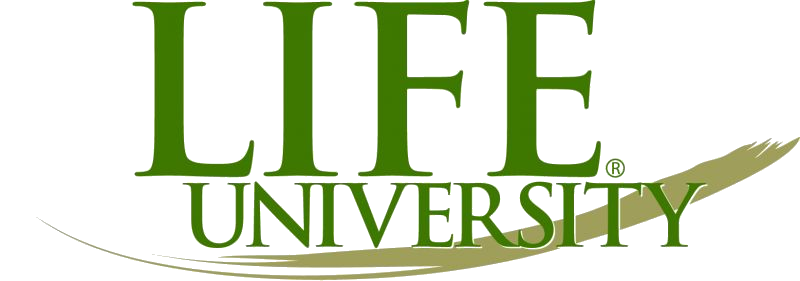

Life University is a private university in Marietta, Georgia that trains chiropractors. It was established in 1974 by chiropractor Sid E. Williams.

== History ==
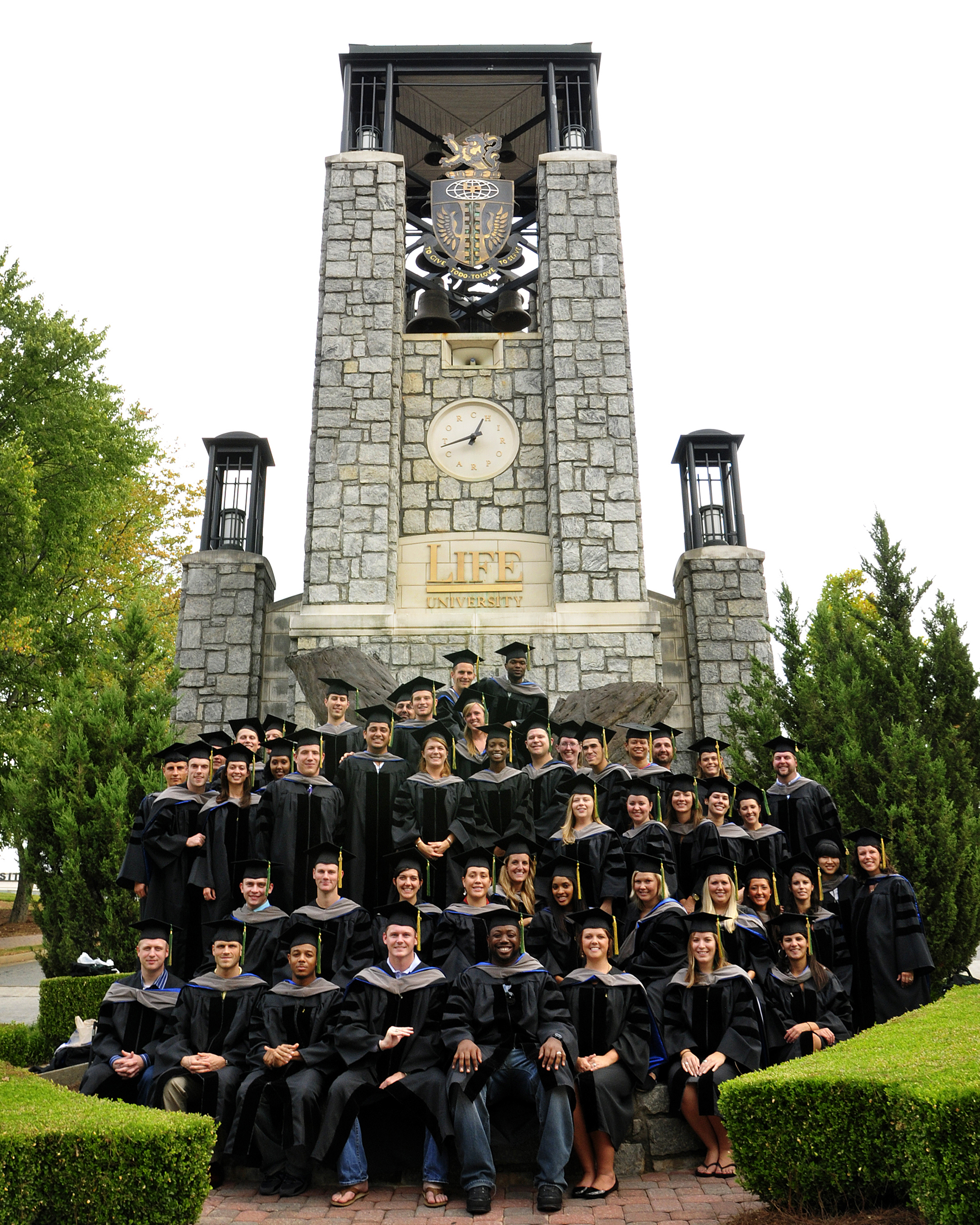
Life University summer 2011 graduation

The university was founded in 1974 by Williams as "Life Chiropractic College" on the site of a placer gold mine, next to Southern Technical Institute (later Southern Polytechnic State University and now Kennesaw State University – Marietta Campus). Twenty-two students attended the first classes in January 1975.

In 1989, the name was shortened to "Life College", as it had recently opened an undergraduate program and was no longer purely chiropractic. This undergraduate program allowed Life to establish an intercollegiate athletic program. By 1990, it had grown to become the largest college of chiropractic in the world. In 1996, Life College became Life University.

In March 2004, Guy Riekeman, the former chancellor of the Palmer Chiropractic University System, was appointed as the president of Life University. In 2017, Rob Scott took over as president of the university and Riekeman became chancellor.

In 2024, a report by the U.S. Department of Education highlighted that students enrolled in Life University’s Doctor of Chiropractic program had a debt-to-income ratio of 490%. This placed the program as the 12th highest among all graduate programs in the United States. The median student loan debt for the program was reported as $245,218, while the median annual income for graduates was $50,040.

An analysis of Health Education Assistance Loan defaults, conducted by Quackwatch at four intervals between 1999 and 2012, consistently showed that Life University had the highest number of defaulted loans among health professionals. During this period, the proportion of loan defaults by Life students accounted for between 8% and 12% of all health professional defaults.

=== Anti-vaccine sentiment ===
Life University has been associated with discouraging vaccinations, a position that contrasts with the recommendations of mainstream medical and public health experts. In 2017, anti-vaccine activists Andrew Wakefield and Del Bigtree were invited to speak at Life University’s “flagship seminar.”

In 2023, Life University president Rob Scott invited Robert F. Kennedy Jr., a well-known figure in the COVID-19 anti-vaccine movement, to be the closing speaker at the university’s “Life Vision Extravaganza,” a convention with space for up to 2,000 attendees.

=== Accreditation ===
The university is accredited by the Southern Association of Colleges and Schools to award associate, bachelor, master's and doctoral degrees. The doctoral degree program is also accredited by the Council on Chiropractic Education. Two programs in dietetics are accredited by the American Dietetic Association.

On June 7, 2002, the Commission on Accreditation of the Council on Chiropractic Education (CCE), which is the national organization that accredits chiropractic schools in the US, revoked the accreditation status of Life University. A federal judge retroactively restored the accreditation in February 2003 and placed the chiropractic program on a probationary status. This was due to CCE's investigators apparently concluding that Life students were not being taught how to detect and deal with problems that require medical attention. CCE's investigative report noted that "all patient charts reviewed revealed primary diagnoses of subluxation." The Georgia Board of Chiropractic Examiners issued a statement supporting CCE's decision. Life appealed, but in October 2002, CCE ruled against it. Life University eventually had its accreditation restored.

The school's handling of classes and clinic during the COVID-19 Pandemic came under scrutiny. It was put on temporary probation for falling three points short of the required threshold of 80%.

== Athletics ==
The Life athletic teams are called the Running Eagles. The university is a member of the National Association of Intercollegiate Athletics (NAIA), primarily competing in the Southern States Athletic Conference (SSAC; formerly known as Georgia–Alabama–Carolina Conference (GACC) until after the 2003–04 school year) starting the 2022–23 academic year. The Running Eagles previously competed in Mid-South Conference (MSC) from 2014–15 to 2021–22; as an NAIA independent within the Association of Independent Institutions (AII) from 2008–09 to 2011–12 (and again in the 2013–14 school year), and in the TranSouth Athletic Conference (TranSouth or TSAC) that only lasted within the 2012–13 school year.

Life competes in 20 intercollegiate varsity sports teams. Men's sports include basketball, bowling, cross country, rugby, soccer, swimming, track & field, volleyball and wrestling. Women's sports include basketball, bowling, cross country, lacrosse, rugby, soccer, swimming, track & field, volleyball and wrestling. Co-educational sports include cheerleading.

=== Intercollegiate rugby program ===
The Running Eagles reached the national quarterfinals in 2011 in its first season. Life reached the national semifinals in the 2011–12 season and finished the season ranked #2 in the US. In 2018 and 2019, Life beat the California Golden Bears to become back-to-back national champions.

Life University has been successful in rugby sevens. It won the 2011 USA Rugby Sevens Collegiate National Championships. Life won the spring 2012 Las Vegas Invitational, earning a place at the June 2012 Collegiate Rugby Championship, where Life was undefeated in pool play and reached the semi-finals. The CRC tournament, played at PPL Park in Philadelphia, is the highest profile college rugby tournament in the US and is broadcast live every year on NBC. Life won the fall 2012 South Independent 7s tournament. This victory earned Life an automatic place and a chance to defend its title at the fall 2012 USA Rugby Sevens Collegiate National Championships, where Life went 5–1 and finished second in the tournament, losing in the Cup Championship match to rival Arkansas State. In 2013, Life went 5–1 at the USA Rugby Sevens Collegiate National Championships to finish fifth.

=== Men's senior rugby ===
Since 1986, Life has played at a senior level, including in the Rugby Super League from 1997 to 2002. Life rejoined the RSL in 2009.

=== Notable alumni ===
- Kendal Grey, professional wrestler
