= Potomac Rugby Conference =

- Founded: 2012
- Sports fielded: 1; men's: 7
- No. of teams: 7
- Official website: potomacrugby.org

The Potomac Rugby Conference is a men's intercollegiate rugby conference of the National Small College Rugby Organization.

This conference now consist of the college men rugby teams from the District of Columbia and Maryland. It previously included other teams and was also a DII conference affiliated with USA Rugby.

== Member schools ==
=== Current members ===
School	Location
Frostburg State University	Frostburg, Maryland
St. Mary's College of Maryland	St. Mary's City, Maryland
Loyola University	Baltimore
Johns Hopkins University	Baltimore
American University	Washington, D.C.
George Washington University	Washington, D.C.
Catholic University of America	Washington, D.C.

=== Former members ===
School	Location	Current Conference
Salisbury University	Salisbury, Maryland	Chesapeake Collegiate Rugby Conference
Georgetown University	Washington, D.C.	Chesapeake Collegiate Rugby Conference
Mount Saint Mary's University	Emmitsburg, Maryland	Chesapeake Collegiate Rugby Conference
Towson University	Towson, Maryland	Chesapeake Collegiate Rugby Conference
Gettysburg College	Gettysburg, Pennsylvania	Eastern Pennsylvania Rugby Union
United States Naval Academy C Team	Annapolis, Maryland	

A new Division I-AA conference named Chesapeake Collegiate Rugby Conference was established to begin competition in Fall 2016, consisting of schools from the Potomac, Atlantic Coast and Cardinals Conferences. Georgetown, Mount St. Mary's, Salisbury, and Towson joined the new conference.

Gettysburg College transferred to the Potomac Conference in the Fall of 2016 from the Eastern Pennsylvania Rugby Union, but moved to the Mid Atlantic Rugby Conference in 2018.

== Conference champions ==
Year	Champion
2012	Salisbury
2013	Mount Saint Mary's
2014	Mount Saint Mary's
2015	Towson
2016	Loyola
2017	Catholic
2018	Catholic

Loyola took 4th place at the national championship in 2018.
