= NCR National Championships =

College rugby union in the United States

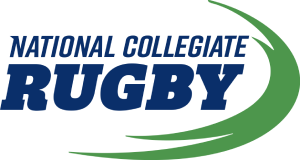
- Sport: Rugby Union
- Founded: 2002
- First season: 2002-03
- No. of teams: Varies
- Country: United States

The NCR National Championships are the United States national championship tournaments sponsored by National Collegiate Rugby (NCR, formerly National Small College Rugby Organization) for men's and women's college rugby in both 15s and 7s rugby.

NSCRO rebranded as NCR in 2020, when it expanded its mission and reach by offering membership and organizing championships for larger colleges playing in upper divisions. Prior to this NSCRO sponsored four regional tournaments: New England, New York/Midwest, Mid-Atlantic, and South. The regional champions were invited to compete in the annual "Fearsome Four" to determine the NSCRO National Champions. The 15's championship is now branded as a part of the Collegiate Rugby Championship.

Division Championships include (for both XVs & 7s):

- Division I (Premier & Club)
- Division I-AA
- Division II
- Division III

Former competitions were:

- Men's 15s Champions Cup
- Men's 15s Challenge Cup
- Women's 15s Nationals

== History ==
From 2002 to 2006 for Men's 15s, and from 2003 to 2006 for Women's 15s, the event name was "East Coast Division 3 Collegiate Championship". In 2007, the events were renamed to "NSCRO Men's Collegiate Division 3 National Championship", "NSCRO Women's Collegiate Division 3 National Championship" and "NSCRO Women's Collegiate Division 4 National Championship". In August 2012, Small College Championship nomenclature replaced Division 3, and since Fall 2012, the "Women's D4 Championship" was discontinued.

In 2015, NSCRO inaugurated the lower-level Men's Challenge Cup Championship, which ran until 2021. In the 2020-21 season, NSCRO rebranded to National Collegiate Rugby (NCR) and introduced Division I, I-AA and II championships. The Small College division and its championship was renamed to Division III in 2024.

== XV's Champions ==
=== Men's Division I ===
| Year | Champion | Score | Runner-up | Location | Date | ref |
| 2021 | St. Bonaventure University | 19 - 18 | Penn State | SaberCats Stadium, Houston TX | 12 Dec 2021 | |
| 2022 | Brown | 21 - 5 | Queens | SaberCats Stadium, Houston TX | 10 Dec 2022 | |
| 2023 | Notre Dame College | 33 - 10 | St. Bonaventure | SaberCats Stadium, Houston TX | 9 Dec 2023 | |
| 2024 | Brown | 23 - 20 | Queens | SaberCats Stadium, Houston TX | 14 Dec 2024 | |
| 2025 | St. Bonaventure University | 55 - 19 | Queens | SaberCats Stadium, Houston TX | 13 Dec 2025 | |

=== Men's Division I-AA ===
| Year | Champion | Score | Runner-up | Location | Date | ref |
| 2021 | Virginia Tech | 34 - 22 | West Chester | SaberCats Stadium, Houston TX | 12 Dec 2021 | |
| 2022 | Virginia Tech | 24 - 22 | Louisville | SaberCats Stadium, Houston TX | 10 Dec 2022 | |
| 2023 | Kentucky | 43 - 28 | Louisville | SaberCats Stadium, Houston TX | 9 Dec 2023 | |
| 2024 | Kentucky | 57 - 14 | Bowling Green | SaberCats Stadium, Houston TX | 14 Dec 2024 | |
| 2025 | Tennessee | 21 - 15 | Bowling Green | SaberCats Stadium, Houston TX | 13 Dec 2025 | |

=== Men's Division II ===
| Season | Champion | Score | Runner-up | Location | Date |
| 2021 | Thomas More | 21 - 17 | Adrian College | SaberCats Stadium, Houston TX | 12 Dec 2021 |
| 2022 | Principia | 34 - 22 | IUP | SaberCats Stadium, Houston TX | 10 Dec 2022 |
| 2023 | IUP | 20 - 17 | Memphis | SaberCats Stadium, Houston TX | 9 Dec 2023 |
| 2024 | IUP | 19 - 14 | Northern Iowa | SaberCats Stadium, Houston TX | 14 Dec 2024 |
| 2025 | Vermont | 71 - 5 | Chicago | SaberCats Stadium, Houston TX | 14 Dec 2025 |

=== Men's Small College/NCR Division III ===
| Season | Champion | Score | Runner-up | Location | ref |
East Coast Division 3 Collegiate Championship (2002–06)
| 2001-02 | Western Carolina University | 15 - 7 | Stonehill College | Bethlehem, Pennsylvania | |
| 2002-03 | Furman University | | Stonehill College | Cherry Hill, New Jersey | |
| 2003-04 | Furman University | 14 - 5 | Central Connecticut | Cherry Hill, New Jersey | |
| 2004-05 | Furman University | | Duke University | Greenville, SC | |
| 2005-06 | Bentley University | 29 - 12 | The Citadel | Richmond, Virginia | |
NSCRO Men's Collegiate Division 3 National Championship (2007-2012)
| 2006-07 | Bentley University | 11 - 10 | Furman University | Winston-Salem, North Carolina | |
| 2007-08 | Plymouth State University | 22 - 17 | Furman University | Hamilton College, Clinton, New York | |
| 2008-09 | Coastal Carolina | 36 - 15 | SUNY-Oswego | Cherry Hill, New Jersey | |
| 2009-10 | Penn State Berks | 11 - 6 | Keene State College | Virginia Beach Sportsplex Stadium, Virginia | |
| 2010-11 | Longwood University | 36 - 27 | Occidental College | Virginia Beach Sportsplex Stadium, Virginia | |
NSCRO XVs Champions Cup/Small College Championship (2012-2023)
| 2011-12 | Salve Regina University | 22 - 15 | California Maritime Academy | Infinity Park, Glendale, CO | |
| 2012-13 | Saint John's (Minn.) | 31 - 16 | Duke University | Infinity Park, Glendale, CO | |
| 2013-14 | Saint John's (Minn.) | 37 - 25 | New England College | Infinity Park, Glendale, CO | |
| 2014-15 | New England College | 32 - 15 | Mount St. Mary's University | Infinity Park, Glendale, CO | |
| 2015-16 | Mount St. Mary's University | 26 - 19 | Claremont Colleges | Infinity Park, Glendale, CO | |
| 2016-17 | Claremont Colleges | 65 - 0 | Tufts | Infinity Park, Glendale, CO | |
| 2017-18 | Iowa Central Community College | 64 - 11 | Claremont Colleges | Life University, Marieta, GA | |
| 2018-19 | Claremont Colleges | 57 - 17 | Christendom College | Siena University, Albany, NY | |
| 2019-20 | Tournament cancelled due to Covid-19 | | | | |
| 2021 | Christendom College | 34 - 29 | New Mexico Tech | SaberCats Stadium, Houston, TX | |
| 2022 | Cal Poly Humboldt | 20 - 15 | Wayne State College | SaberCats Stadium, Houston, TX | |
| 2023 | Babson | 27 - 23 | Wayne State College | SaberCats Stadium, Houston, TX | |
NCR Division III (Renamed from Small College from 2024)
| 2024 | Wayne State College | 27 - 8 | Holy Cross | SaberCats Stadium, Houston, TX | |
| 2025 | Franciscan | 29 - 17 | Slippery Rock | SaberCats Stadium, Houston, TX | |

=== Men's Challenge Cup Championship (2014-2021) ===
| Year | Champions | Score | Runner-up | Location | ref |
|---|---|---|---|---|---|
| 2014-15 | University of the Pacific | 39 - 32 | Northern Colorado | Founders Field, Cheswick, Pennsylvania | |
| 2015-16 | Salem State University | 43 - 17 | Point Loma Nazarene | Founders Field, Cheswick, Pennsylvania | |
| 2016-17 | Bethel College | 30 - 21 | Iowa Central Community College | Founders Field, Cheswick, Pennsylvania | |
| 2017-18 | MiraCosta College | 56 - 5 | John Carroll University | Founders Field, Cheswick, Pennsylvania | |
| 2018-19 | Azusa Pacific University | 30 - 21 | Washington & Lee | Siena College, Loudonville, NY | |
| 2019-20 | Tournament cancelled due to Covid-19 | | | | |
| 2021 | Siena College | 25 - 20 | Wayne State College | SaberCats Stadium, Houston, TX | |

=== Women's Division I ===
| Season | Champion | Score | Runner-up | Location | ref |
| 2022 | Michigan | 41 - 14 | Notre Dame College | SaberCats Stadium, Houston, TX | |
| 2023 | Michigan | 33 - 17 | Notre Dame College | SaberCats Stadium, Houston, TX | |
| 2024 | Wheeling | 58 - 17 | Southern Nazarene | SaberCats Stadium, Houston, TX | |
| 2025 | Southern Nazarene | 82 - 21 | Northern Iowa | SaberCats Stadium, Houston, TX | |

=== Women's Division I-AA ===
| Season | Champion | Score | Runner-up | Location | ref |
| 2025 | Northeastern | 44 - 10 | Colorado | SaberCats Stadium, Houston, TX | |

=== Women's Division II ===
| Season | Champion | Score | Runner-up | Location | ref |
| 2022 | Wisconsin-Eau Claire | 78 - 0 | Marquette | SaberCats Stadium, Houston, TX | |
| 2023 | Wisconsin-Eau Claire | 32 - 29 | Vassar | SaberCats Stadium, Houston, TX | |
| 2024 | Vassar | 24 - 5 | Wisconsin-Eau Claire | SaberCats Stadium, Houston, TX | |
| 2025 | Coast Guard | 51 - 12 | Wisconsin-Eau Claire | SaberCats Stadium, Houston, TX | |

=== Women's Small College/NCR Division III ===
| Season | Champion | Score | Runner-up | Location | ref |
East Coast Division 3 Collegiate Championship (2003–06)
| 2003 | The College of New Jersey | | University of Maine | | |
| 2004 | Fordham | | Susquehanna University | | |
| 2005 | Castleton | | Susquehanna University | | |
| 2006 | Babson | | Ursinus College | | |
NSCRO Women's Collegiate Division 3 National Championship (2007–12)
| 2007 (spring) | Stonehill College | | Penn | | |
| 2007 (fall) | Stonehill College | | Marist College | | |
| 2008 | Bryant | | Gettysburg | | |
| 2009 | Massachusetts Institute of Technology | 41 – 5 | East Stroudsburg | South Jersey RFC, Cherry Hill, NJ | |
| 2010 | Bentley | 3 – 0 | Drexel | South Jersey RFC, Cherry Hill, NJ | |
| 2011 | Carleton College | 59 – 7 | Lock Haven | South Jersey RFC, Cherry Hill, NJ | |
| 2012 | Wayne State College | 32 – 0 | Roger Williams | South Jersey RFC, Cherry Hill, NJ | |
NSCRO Women's Small College Championship (2013–23)
| 2013 | Wayne State College | 18 – 5 | Smith | South Jersey RFC, Cherry Hill, NJ | |
| 2014 | Roger Williams | 45 – 10 | Sacred Heart | South Jersey RFC, Cherry Hill, NJ | |
| 2015 | Minnesota State University Moorhead | 44 – 24 | Colgate | Rugby Athletic Center, Charlotte, NC | |
| 2016 | Wayne State College | 11 – 0 | Colgate | Life University, Marieta, GA | |
| 2017 | Wayne State College | 46 – 26 | Bentley | Life University, Marieta, GA | |
| 2018 | Wayne State College | 67 – 12 | Catholic | Life University, Marieta, GA | |
| 2019 | Wayne State College | 90 – 14 | Endicott | Life University, Marieta, GA | |
| 2019-20 | Tournament cancelled due to Covid-19 | | | | |
| 2021 | Wayne State College | 72 – 10 | SUNY–Cortland | Tennessee Rugby Park, Knoxville, TN | |
| 2022 | Endicott | 24 – 12 | Lee | SaberCats Stadium, Houston, TX | |
| 2023 | St. Bonaventure | 22 – 17 | Wisconsin-Platteville | SaberCats Stadium, Houston, TX | |
NCR Division III (Renamed from Small College from 2024)
| 2024 | Endicott | 22 – 15 | Colorado School of Mines | SaberCats Stadium, Houston, TX | |
| 2025 | Colorado School of Mines | 38 – 29 | Endicott | SaberCats Stadium, Houston, TX | |

== 7's Champions (CRC National 7's) ==
=== Men's Division I Club & I-AA ===
| Season | Champion | Score | Runner-up | Location | ref |
| 2022 | Sam Houston State | 17 - 15 | Salisbury | Gold Mine, New Orleans, LA | |
| 2023 | San Diego | 15 - 7 | Clemson | Maryland SoccerPlex, Greater Washington, DC | |
| 2024 | Louisville | 29 - 0 | NC State | Maryland SoccerPlex, Greater Washington, DC | |
| 2025 | NC State | 12 - 7 | UNC - Charlotte | Maryland SoccerPlex, Greater Washington, DC | |
NCR Division I-AA (from 2026)
| 2026 | Louisville | 26 - 12 | South Carolina | Maryland SoccerPlex, Greater Washington, DC | |

=== Men's Division II ===
| Season | Champion | Score | Runner-up | Location | ref |
| 2022 | Indiana University of Pennsylvania | 17 - 7 | Lander | Gold Mine, New Orleans, LA | |
| 2023 | Indiana University of Pennsylvania | 12 - 7 | NC State | Maryland SoccerPlex, Greater Washington, DC | |
| 2024 | Maine | 19 - 15 | Georgetown | Maryland SoccerPlex, Greater Washington, DC | |
| 2025 | UNC Wilmington | 24 - 12 | Montana State | Maryland SoccerPlex, Greater Washington, DC | |
| 2026 | UNC Wilmington | 7 - 0 | Coastal Carolina | Maryland SoccerPlex, Greater Washington, DC | |

=== Men's Small College & Division III ===
| Season | Champion | Score | Runner-up | Location | ref |
| 2012-13 | Occidental College | 28 - 15 | University of North Florida | PPL Park, Chester, PA | |
| 2013-14 | New England College | 22 - 14 | New Mexico Highlands University | PPL Park, Chester, PA | |
| 2014-15 | New Mexico Highlands University | 22 - 19 | New England College | PPL Park, Chester, PA | |
| 2015-16 | New Mexico Highlands University | 31 - 7 | St. Mary's College of Maryland | Talen Energy Stadium, Chester, PA | |
| 2016-17 | Christendom College | 24 - 19 | St. Mary's College of Maryland | Talen Energy Stadium, Chester, PA | |
| 2017-18 | The Claremont Colleges | 17 - 0 | Salve Regina University | Talen Energy Stadium, Chester, PA | |
| 2018-19 | New Mexico Highlands University^{V} | 17 - 12 | The Claremont Colleges | Talen Energy Stadium, Chester, PA | |
| 2019-21 | Tournament cancelled due to Covid-19 | | | | |
| 2022 | New Mexico Tech | 26 - 10 | Christendom College | Gold Mine, New Orleans, LA | |
| 2023 | Babson | 17 - 0 | Springfield | Maryland SoccerPlex, Greater Washington, DC | |
NCR Division III (from 2024)
| 2024 | Slippery Rock | 19 - 12 | St. Thomas (Minn.) | Maryland SoccerPlex, Greater Washington, DC | |
| 2025 | Wisconsin-Eau Claire | 20 - 0 | Springfield | Maryland SoccerPlex, Greater Washington, DC | |
| 2026 | Slippery Rock | 17 - 0 | Denver | Maryland SoccerPlex, Greater Washington, DC | |

^{V} - Title was vacated by NSCRO

=== Women's Division I Club & I-AA ===
| Season | Champion | Score | Runner-up | Location | ref |
| 2022 | Roger Williams | 12 - 7 | Wisconsin-Eau Claire | Gold Mine, New Orleans, LA | |
| 2023 | Clemson | 29 - 17 | UMass | Maryland SoccerPlex, Greater Washington, DC | |
| 2024 | Claremont | 17 - 7 | Oregon | Maryland SoccerPlex, Greater Washington, DC | |
| 2025 | Northeastern | 15 - 12 | Iowa | Maryland SoccerPlex, Greater Washington, DC | |
NCR Division I-AA (from 2026)
| 2026 | Northeastern | 14 - 0 | Colorado State | Maryland SoccerPlex, Greater Washington, DC | |

=== Women's Division II ===
| Season | Champion | Score | Runner-up | Location | ref |
| 2022 | Chicago | 10 - 5 | South Dakota | Founders Field, Cheswick, Pennsylvania | |
| 2023 | Roger Williams | 10 - 5 | Colorado Mines | Maryland SoccerPlex, Greater Washington, DC | |
| 2024 | Wisconsin-Eau Claire | 22 - 5 | Roger Williams | Maryland SoccerPlex, Greater Washington, DC | |
| 2025 | Coast Guard | 17 - 5 | Roger Williams | Maryland SoccerPlex, Greater Washington, DC | |
| 2026 | Colorado Mesa | 17 - 0 | Coast Guard | Maryland SoccerPlex, Greater Washington, DC | |

=== Women's Small College & Division III ===
| Season | Champion | Score | Runner-up | Location | ref |
| 2014 | Wayne State College | 24 – 7 | South Dakota State | Grand Valley State University, Allendale, Michigan | |
| 2015 | Wayne State College | 22 – 17 | Mount St. Mary's University | Founders Field, Cheswick, Pennsylvania | |
| 2016 | Wayne State College | 20 – 0 | Colorado College | Founders Field, Cheswick, Pennsylvania | |
| 2017 | Colgate University | 15 – 12 | Wayne State College | Founders Field, Cheswick, Pennsylvania | |
| 2018 | Wayne State College | 24 – 5 | Lee | Founders Field, Cheswick, Pennsylvania | |
| 2019 | Wayne State College | 31 – 7 | Rochester | Founders Field, Cheswick, Pennsylvania | |
| 2020-22 | Tournament cancelled due to Covid-19 | | | | |
| 2023 | Endicott | 15 - 10 | Lee | Maryland SoccerPlex, Greater Washington, DC | |
| 2024 | Yale | 31 - 7 | Gannon | Maryland SoccerPlex, Greater Washington, DC | |
| 2025 | Endicott | 32 - 0 | Baldwin Wallace | Maryland SoccerPlex, Greater Washington, DC | |
| 2026 | Colorado Mines | 24 - 0 | MiraCosta | Maryland SoccerPlex, Greater Washington, DC | |

== See also ==
- College rugby
- NCR XVs Champions Cup
- Collegiate Rugby Championship
- NSCRO Women's National Championship
- Intercollegiate sports team champions
