= 2009 NSCRO Men's Division III Rugby Tournament =

The 2009 Men's Division III Rugby Tournament is a tournament which involved 103 schools playing in a single-elimination tournament to determine the national champion of men's NSCRO Division III college rugby as a culmination of the 2008–09 rugby season. It began in the fall 2008 season in the northeast, midwest and mid-atlantic, and picked up again in the spring 2009 season for the southern teams, and concludes with the Fearsome Four, a final four-style semifinals and championship games co-hosted by South Jersey RFC on April 25-6 in Cherry Hill, New Jersey.

== National Championship Bracket ==
=== Fearsome Four – Cherry Hill, New Jersey ===
National Semifinals; April 25 @ 1pm, & 3pm
NE1	Salve Regina University	19
NY2	SUNY Oswego	39
MA3	Longwood University	25
USARS4	Coastal Carolina	36

National Championship Game; April 26 at noon
SUNY Oswego	15
Coastal Carolina	36

== National Semifinal ==
The National Semifinals were held on a warm sunny day, on a badly worn pitch at Green Acre Park in Cherry Hill, NJ. The event was not well publicized. Each match was attended by about 40 rugby fans, friends and family members. The event host, South Jersey RFC, had a small concession lean-to, offering pretzels, sodas and event T-shirts.

In the first match of the day, New England Rugby Football Union Champion Salve Regina met NY State Rugby Conference Champion SUNY Oswego. Salve Regina was the only true small college in the tournament (having approximately 500 male students to SUNY's 3000), and it showed. SUNY's large squad took advantage of poor SRU tackling up the middle and took a 22-0 lead into halftime. The first half was led by the dominance of Oswego flankers Matt Moir (senior)with 4 tries, Kandu Agmibson, fly half Jordan Storie (senior captain), and outside center Jay McGukin (senior captain).

In the second half, Oswego replaced four of its starters including starting scrum half and senior captain Alex Rufer among others due to injury and conservation for the finals match, which was to be determined. Consequently, SRU showed some spirit and put points on the board, exchanging tries with SUNY, but they never really got the hang of EPRU referee Pete Hesler's refusal to penalize an offside. And on those other penalties that were called, SRU was physically restrained from quicktapping on multiple occasions by Hesler to allow Oswego to adequately retreat. One such restraint took place on the Oswego 5m line, evoking a barrage of criticism from the SRU sideline, and for which they probably should have been disciplined. Overall, SUNY Oswego was by far the better team on the day, running in multiply tries from outside the 22m.

In the second match, VRU Champion Longwood met USA Rugby South Champion Coastal Carolina. The two teams were well coached and matched up very well. Again, however, the large college program carried the day. Coastal Carolina was physically larger, and took an early lead, but Longwood battled back, playing smart rugby and making some key kicks for points. At halftime, Coastal Carolina held a 17-13 lead. In the second half, fitness seemed to be an issue, not so much for the teams, but for the officiating crew, all of whom seemed to be approaching 60 years old and overweight. Apparently, the event host had some difficulty arranging referees, and had to do some last minute scrambling to obtain referee coverage. Longwood took a brief lead, before giving it back to Coastal Carolina for good about midway through the second half. Coastal Carolina was the best team on Saturday. They were big, fit, aggressive and knowledgeable. Longwood matched them in every category but size and points.

== Regional Brackets ==
=== Northeast Regional Bracket ===
The Northeast Regional Bracket is the home of USA Rugby territorial union Northeast Rugby Union ("NRU") (partial). More specifically, it is the home of NRU's largest local area union, the New England Rugby Football Union (NERFU), and its twenty-four (24) Men's College Division III Rugby teams.

NERFU plays its regular season in the fall. At the end of the regular season, the top two teams in each of its four conferences participate in the NERFU College Men's Division III Cup Championship, which also serves as the NSCRO Northeast Regional Championship. In November 2008, Salve Regina University defeated Southern Connecticut State University 21-20 to win the regional championship. See 2008 NERFU College Men's Division III Rugby Tournament.

In this bracket were one union champion and three conference champions:

- Salve Regina University - New England Rugby Football Union Men's College Division III Champion
- Tufts University - NERFU East Men's College Division III Champion
- Southern Connecticut State University - NERFU South Men's College Division III Champion
- Keene State College - NERFU West Men's College Division III Champion

Quarterfinals
Salve Regina University	29
Western Connecticut State University	21
Tufts University	10
Plymouth State University	24
Southern Connecticut State University	31
University of Massachusetts Dartmouth	17
Keene State College	39
Saint Anselm College	0

Semifinals
Salve Regina University	19
Plymouth State University	17
Southern Connecticut State University	21
Keene State College	15

Regional Championship
November 8 – Newport, Rhode Island
Salve Regina University	21
Southern Connecticut State University	20

=== New York/Midwest Regional Bracket ===
The New York/Midwest Regional Bracket is the home of USA Rugby territorial unions Northeast Rugby Union (partial) and Midwest Rugby Union, and their twenty-six (26) men's college division III rugby programs.

In this bracket were 3 union champions and one conference champion:

- SUNY Oswego - New York State Rugby Conference Men's College Division III Champion
- William Paterson University - Metropolitan New York Rugby Union Men's College Division III Champion
- Fairmont State University - Allegheny Rugby Union Men's College Division III Champion
- Clarkson University - NYS East Men's College Division III Champion

Quarterfinals
Clarkson University	15
SUNY Buffalo C	5
SUNY Oswego	30
Paul Smiths College	0
SUNY Maritime	10
William Paterson	20
Grove City College	12
Fairmont State College	36

Semifinals
Clarkson University	20
SUNY Oswego	25 OT
William Paterson	22
Fairmont State University	25 OT

Regional Championship
April 5 – Reading, Pennsylvania
SUNY Oswego	17
Fairmont State University	15

=== Mid-Atlantic Regional Bracket ===
The Mid-Atlantic Regional Bracket is the home of USA Rugby territorial union Mid-Atlantic Rugby Football Union or MARFU and their twenty-two (22) men's college division III rugby programs.

In this bracket were 3 union champions and a runner-up:

- Widener University - Eastern Pennsylvania Rugby Union Men's College Division III Champion
- Penn State Berks - Eastern Pennsylvania Rugby Union Men's College Division III Runner-Up
- American University - Potomac Rugby Union Men's College Division III Champion
- Longwood University - Virginia Rugby Union Men's College Division III Champion

Quarterfinals
Widener University	21
Penn State Berks	0
American University	17
Frostburg State University	15
Longwood University	16
Virginia Tech C	12
Penn State Berks	0
Widener University	21

Semifinals
Widener University	29
American University	18
Longwood University	16
Penn State Berks	11

Regional Championship
March 29 – Bridgeport, Pennsylvania
Widener University	7
Longwood University	22

=== South Regional Bracket ===
The South Regional Bracket is the home of USA Rugby territorial union USA Rugby South ("USARS") and their thirty-one (31) men's college division III rugby programs.

In this bracket were 4 conference champions and their runners-up:

- Lee University - USARS Men's College Division III - Conference A Champion
- Tulane University - USARS Men's College Division III - Conference B Champion
- Coastal Carolina University - USARS Men's College Division III - Conference C Champion
- Elon University - USARS Men's College Division III - Conference D Champion

Quarterfinals
Lee University	7 (ff)
Mississippi State University	0
Coastal Carolina University	7 (ff)
Guilford College	0
Tulane University	7 (ff)
Tennessee Tech University	0
Elon University	17
Furman University	20

Semifinals
Lee University	5
Coastal Carolina University	12
Tulane University	10
Furman University	26

Regional Championship
March 29 – Tuscaloosa, Alabama
Coastal Carolina University	13
Furman University	10

== See also ==
- National Small College Rugby Organization
