= Fordham Rams =

Sports teams of Fordham University, US

- University: Fordham University
- Nickname: "The Rams" "Old Maroon"
- NCAA: Division I (FCS)
- Conference: Atlantic 10 (primary); Patriot League (football); MAWPC (water polo); CSA (men’s squash)
- Athletic director: Charles Guthrie
- Location: Bronx, New York
- Varsity teams: 20
- Football stadium: Jack Coffey Field
- Basketball arena: Rose Hill Gymnasium
- Baseball stadium: Houlihan Park
- Softball stadium: Bahoshy Softball Complex/Murphy Field
- Soccer stadium: Jack Coffey Field
- Other venues: Vincent T. Lombardi Memorial Center
- Colors: Maroon and white
- Mascot: Ramses the Ram
- Fight song: The Ram
- Website: fordhamsports.com

The Fordham Rams are the varsity sports teams for Fordham University. Their colors are maroon and white. The Fordham Rams are members of NCAA Division I and compete in the Atlantic 10 Conference for most sports. In football, the Rams play in the Patriot League of NCAA Division 1 Football Championship Subdivision. The university also supports a number of club sports, and a significant intramural sports program. The university's athletic booster clubs include the Sixth Man Club for basketball and the Afterguard for sailing.

== Fordham and the Ivy League ==
Fordham University sports, though not part of the Ivy League, has nevertheless been credited with inspiring the term by comparison. The first usage of "Ivy" in reference to a group of colleges is from sportswriter Stanley Woodward (1895–1965). In an article that appeared in the New York Tribune on October 14, 1933, Woodward, referencing football, wrote

A proportion of our eastern ivy colleges are meeting little fellows another Saturday before plunging into the strife and the turmoil.

William Morris writes that Stanley Woodward actually took the term from fellow New York Tribune sportswriter Caswell Adams. Morris writes that during the 1930s, the Fordham University football team was running roughshod over all its opponents. One day in the sports room at the Tribune, the merits of Fordham's football team was being compared to Princeton and Columbia. Adams remarked disparagingly of the latter two, saying they were "only Ivy League." Woodward, the sports editor of the Tribune, picked up the term and printed it the next day.

== Sports sponsored ==
Men's sports	Women's sports
Baseball	Softball
Basketball	Basketball
Cross country	Cross country
Soccer	Soccer
Swimming and diving	Swimming and diving
Tennis	Tennis
Track and field^{†}	Track and field^{†}
Water polo	Volleyball
Football	Rowing
Golf	Cheerleading
Squash	
† – Track and field includes both indoor and outdoor

Atlantic 10 Conference logo in Fordham colors

As a primary member of the Atlantic 10 Conference, Fordham University sponsors varsity teams in eleven men's and ten women's NCAA sanctioned sports.

=== Baseball ===
Founded in the late 1850s, the Fordham Rose Hill Baseball Club of St. John's College (the precursor to Fordham University, and of no connection at all to St. John's University) played against St. Francis Xavier College in the first ever nine-man-team college baseball game on November 3, 1859. Fordham is the all time NCAA leader in wins.

There have been 56 major leaguers who have played for Fordham, including All-Star pitcher Pete Harnisch and Baseball Hall of Famer Frankie Frisch. Frisch, a star athlete in four different sports at Fordham, was known as the "Fordham Flash". Steve Bellán, first Latin American to play Major League Baseball, started his career as a player at St. John's College.

The team plays home games at Houlihan Park at Jack Coffey Field. Jack Coffey Field, a multisport facility, is named after Jack Coffey, former athletic director and baseball coach at the university. He amassed 817 wins as a baseball coach. Coffey is the only player to play with both Ty Cobb and Babe Ruth in the same season (1918 Detroit Tigers and Boston Red Sox). The baseball portion of the field was renamed "Houlihan Park" after renovations completed in 2005.

=== Basketball ===
Fordham basketball teams (men and women) have been members of the MAAC (1981–82 through 1989–90), Patriot League (1990–91 through 1994–95), and the Atlantic 10 Conference (1995–96 through present).

==== Men ====
Fordham began competing in men's basketball in 1902. They played their first game in Rose Hill Gymnasium on January 16, 1925 (defeating Boston College, 46–16). On February 28, 1940, Fordham hosted the University of Pittsburgh at Madison Square Garden in the first ever televised basketball game. Pitt won, 57–37. The game was televised by NBC. Fordham University enjoyed its best season in 1970–1971, when the squad went 26–3 under coach Digger Phelps and was ranked number nine in the nation in the AP poll.

The Fordham men have won three Patriot League regular season conference titles (1991, 1992, 1994) and two Patriot League tournament championships (1991 and 1992).

Fordham has participated in four NCAA Tournaments (1953, 1954, 1971, 1992), and sixteen NITs (1943, 1958, 1959, 1963, 1965, 1968, 1969, 1972, 1981, 1982, 1983, 1984, 1985, 1988, 1990, 1991). Though Fordham won the 1991 Patriot League Tournament, the NCAA did not grant the Patriot League an automatic bid to the NCAA tournament that year. Instead, Fordham played in one of three "play-in games", but lost, and was not considered to have reached the NCAA Tournament.

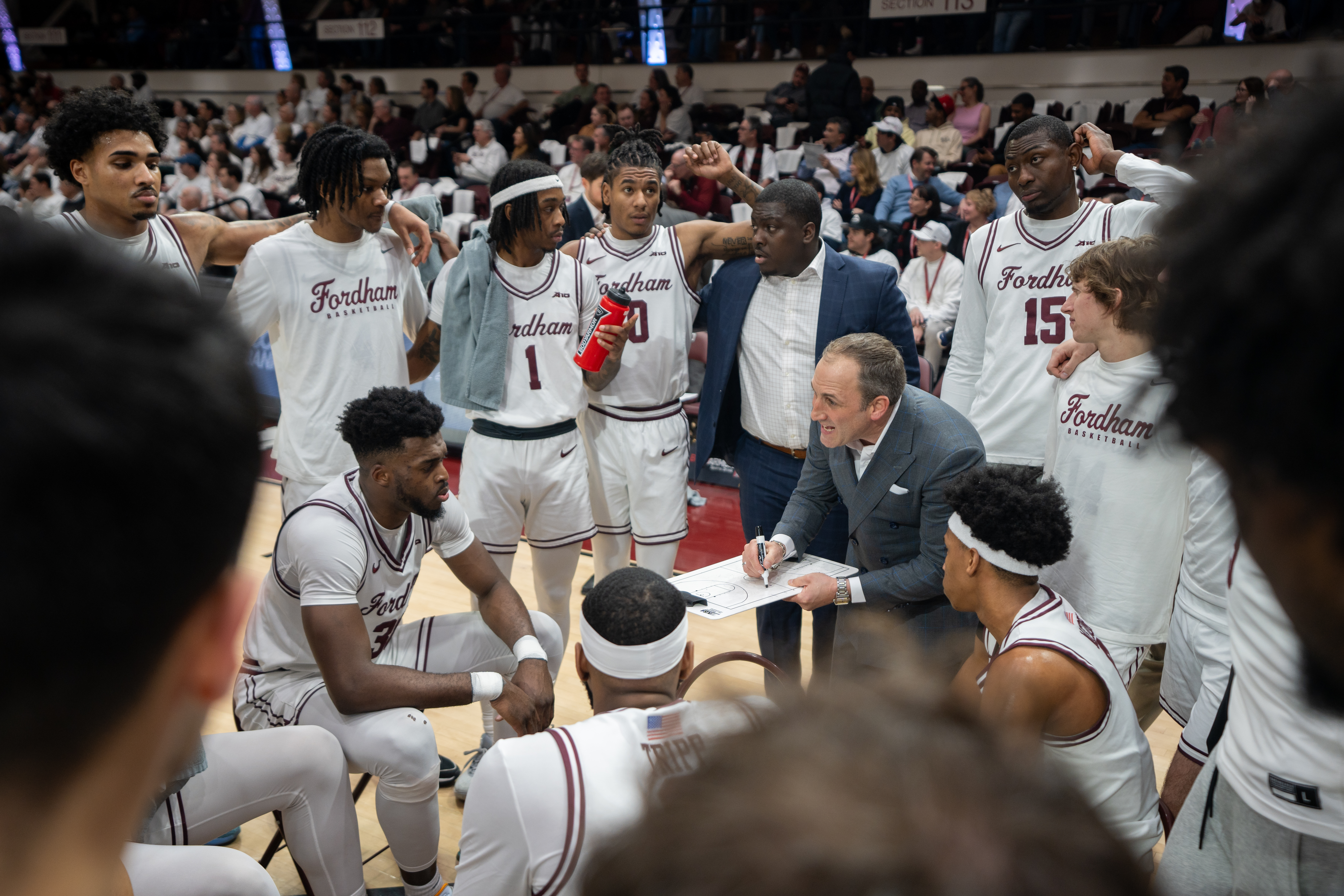
Keith Urgo, head coach of Fordham's men's basketball program, sketches up a play during a timeout in 2024

In the 2009–10 season, Fordham went 0–16 in the A-10 conference season (2–26 overall), becoming the first team to go winless in an A-10 conference season since St. Bonaventure in 1992–93. That winless streak, which started during the 2008–09 season, ended on the 2010–11 season's final game, snapping the streak at 41.

Through the end of the 2010–11 season, the program's cumulative record is 1,444 wins and 1,237 losses (.539 win percentage).

After leading the team to a 25-8 record in 2022-23, head coach Keith Urgo received the John B. Hall award, one given to the top first-year coach in Division 1 basketball. In addition, the Atlantic 10 conference named Keith Urgo coach of the year for the 2023 season, being the second Fordham coach to receive this honor.

The Rams won more home games in the 2023 season than any other college team in the nation.

==== Women ====
Women's basketball at Fordham began as a club team in 1963–64. They became an NCAA competitive team in 1970–71. The Rams have won the Patriot League Championship in 1992 and 1994 and the Atlantic 10 women's basketball tournament in 2014. They have played in the 1994 NCAA tournament, the 2013 WNIT, and the 2014 NCAA Division I women's basketball tournament.

=== Football ===
Tackle Ed Franco was a consensus All-American. So was center Alex Wojciechowicz who later became an All-Pro with Detroit and Philadelphia. Guard Vince Lombardi later became one of the greatest of pro coaches. In 1937, the Rams went undefeated and were ranked number three nationally. The team was so popular that the Cleveland Rams, an NFL team, were named after them. The Cleveland Rams have since moved to Los Angeles in 1946, then to St. Louis in 1995, and returned to Los Angeles in 2016.

On September 30, 1939, Fordham participated in the world's first televised American football game. In front of the sport's first live TV audience, the Rams defeated Waynesburg College 34–7. The following week they lost the second ever televised game to the University of Alabama, 7–6. It was not for another month that a professional NFL game was televised.

Fordham has dropped their football program on several different occasions. Fordham first dropped football between 1894–95, and then again between 1910–11, 1919, and 1943-45. On December 15, 1954, Fordham scratched its football program for the fifth time, for various reasons, mainly financial. A club football team was established in 1964 (on shaky authority) and football was re-established as a varsity sport in 1970, but in Division III. Fordham joined what is now the NCAA Division I Football Championship Subdivision in 1989.

With 722 all-time wins at the close of the 2005 season, Fordham's football program ranks 15th among Division I programs on the all-time NCAA wins list, and fifth among programs currently playing in the NCAA Football Championship Subdivision, trailing only Yale University, the University of Pennsylvania, Harvard University, and Princeton University (putting the Rams in first among non-Ivy League schools in the FCS standings).

Fordham was invited to play in the 1942 Rose Bowl, but declined the invitation because it had previously accepted a berth in the 1942 Sugar Bowl. The Rams, who defeated the University of Missouri by a 2–0 score, were the 1942 Sugar Bowl champions. The Rams also played in the 1941 Cotton Bowl Classic but lost 13–12 to Texas A&M. At least one source lists Fordham as the 1929 National Football Champions.

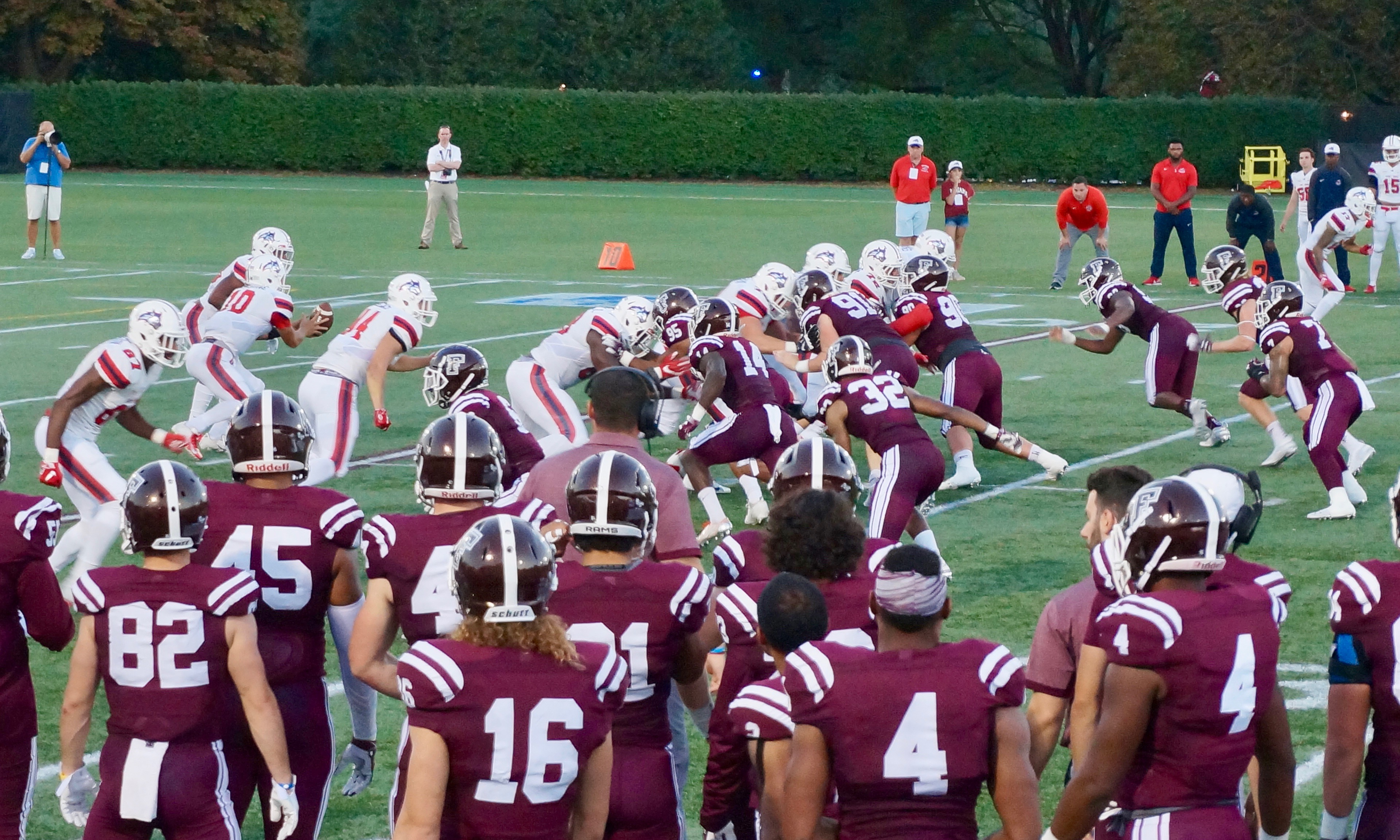
Fordham vs. SUNY-Stony Brook game in 2018

Since 2002, Fordham has played Columbia University for The Liberty Cup. The trophy was dedicated after the attacks of September 11, 2001, forced the postponement of the first annual meeting between New York City's two Division I football programs. In 2009 the university announced that it will be offering scholarships for football for the first time since 1954. This makes the Rams ineligible to compete for the Patriot League championship, but simultaneously allows them to schedule games with Football Bowl Subdivision teams such as the Army Black Knights and the Navy Midshipmen (which are members of the Patriot League outside football), both immediately scheduled. In addition, the Rams are still eligible for an at-large bid for the Championship Subdivision play-offs. In 2013, the Rams had a record year in going 12-2 with wins over FBS Temple and ranked Villanova and Lehigh teams and went to the second round of the FCS playoffs.

Fordham University's 2023 Football team had an overall record of 6-5 with a 2-4 record in the Patriot League. Their biggest win of the season came against Lehigh University with a score of 38-35 on October 7, 2023. Kicker Brandon Peskin kicked the 44-yard game-winning field goal with one second left on the clock. During the pregame on October 7, 2023, during Fordham University's homecoming football game, the school announced renaming the Jack Coffey Field to The Joe Moglia Stadium in honor of Fordham Alum Joe Moglia.

==== Milestones ====
- National Championship: 1929
- Bowl games:
  - 1941 Cotton Bowl Classic (loss)
  - 1942 Sugar Bowl (win)
- Patriot League champions: 2002, 2007, 2014
- NCAA Football Championship Subdivision playoffs: 2002 (quarterfinals loss), 2007 (first round loss), 2013 (second round loss), 2014 (second round loss)
- Division III playoffs: 1987 (quarterfinals loss)
- Liberty Cup winners: 2003, 2004, 2007, 2008, 2010, 2011, 2012, 2013, 2014
- Wins: 722 at the end of 2005 season, 15th most wins in NCAA, 5th most wins in Division I Football Championship Subdivision

==== Recent players in professional football ====
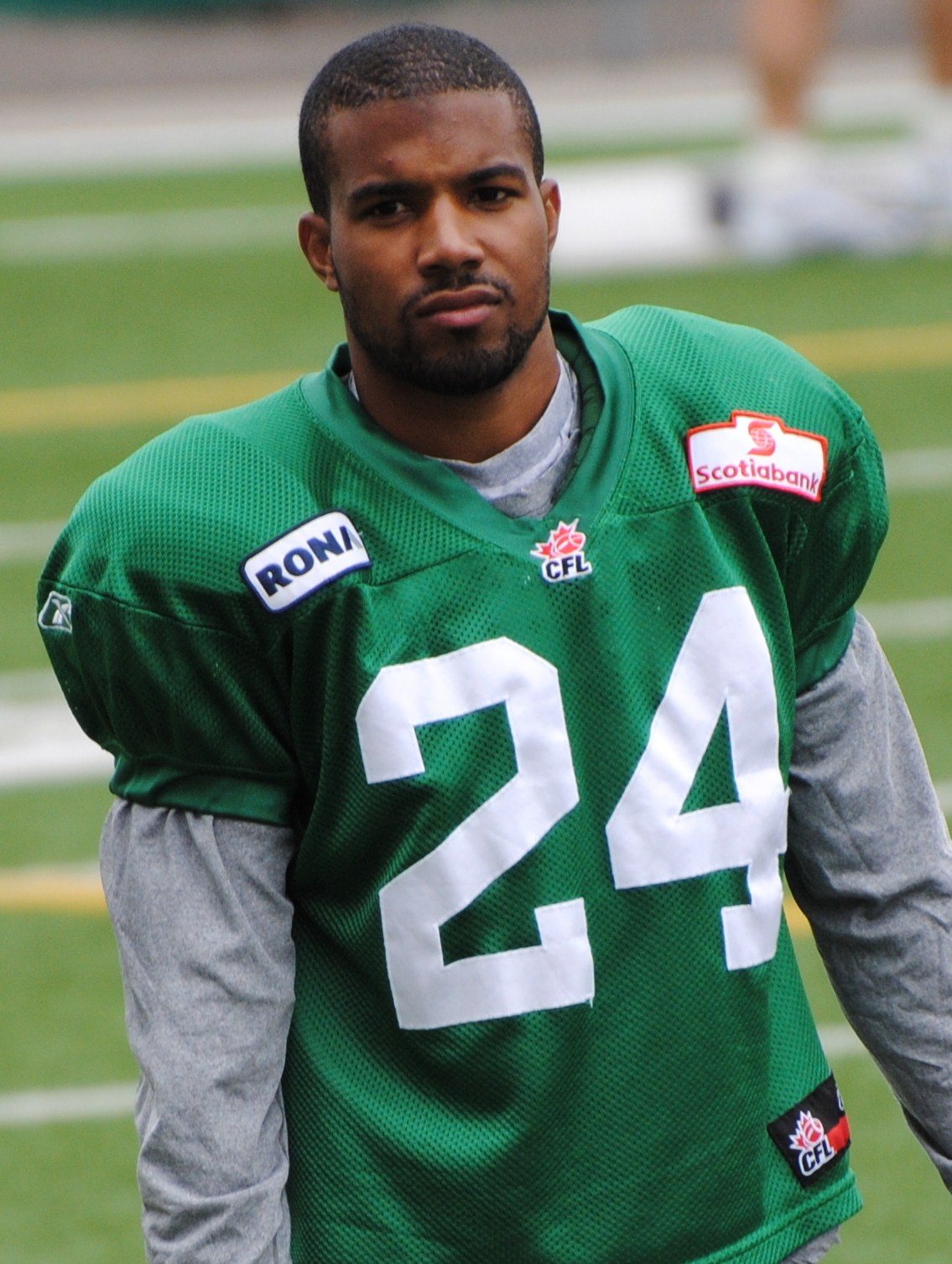
Tad Kornegay played for the Fordham Rams from 2001–04, and was named the school's Male Athlete of the Year in his senior season

- Javarus Dudley, WR, Orlando Predators
- Kevin Eakin, QB, Team Alabama
- Aki Jones, DL, New York Dragons
- Tad Kornegay, DB, Calgary Stampeders
- Cary Williams, CB, Philadelphia Eagles
- John Skelton, QB, San Francisco 49ers
- Isa Abdul-Quddus, S, New Orleans Saints
- Patrick Murray, K, Tampa Bay Buccaneers
- Steve Skelton, TE, Houston Texans
- Chase Edmonds, RB, Miami Dolphins
- Nick Zakelj, T, San Francisco 49ers

=== Soccer ===
==== Men ====
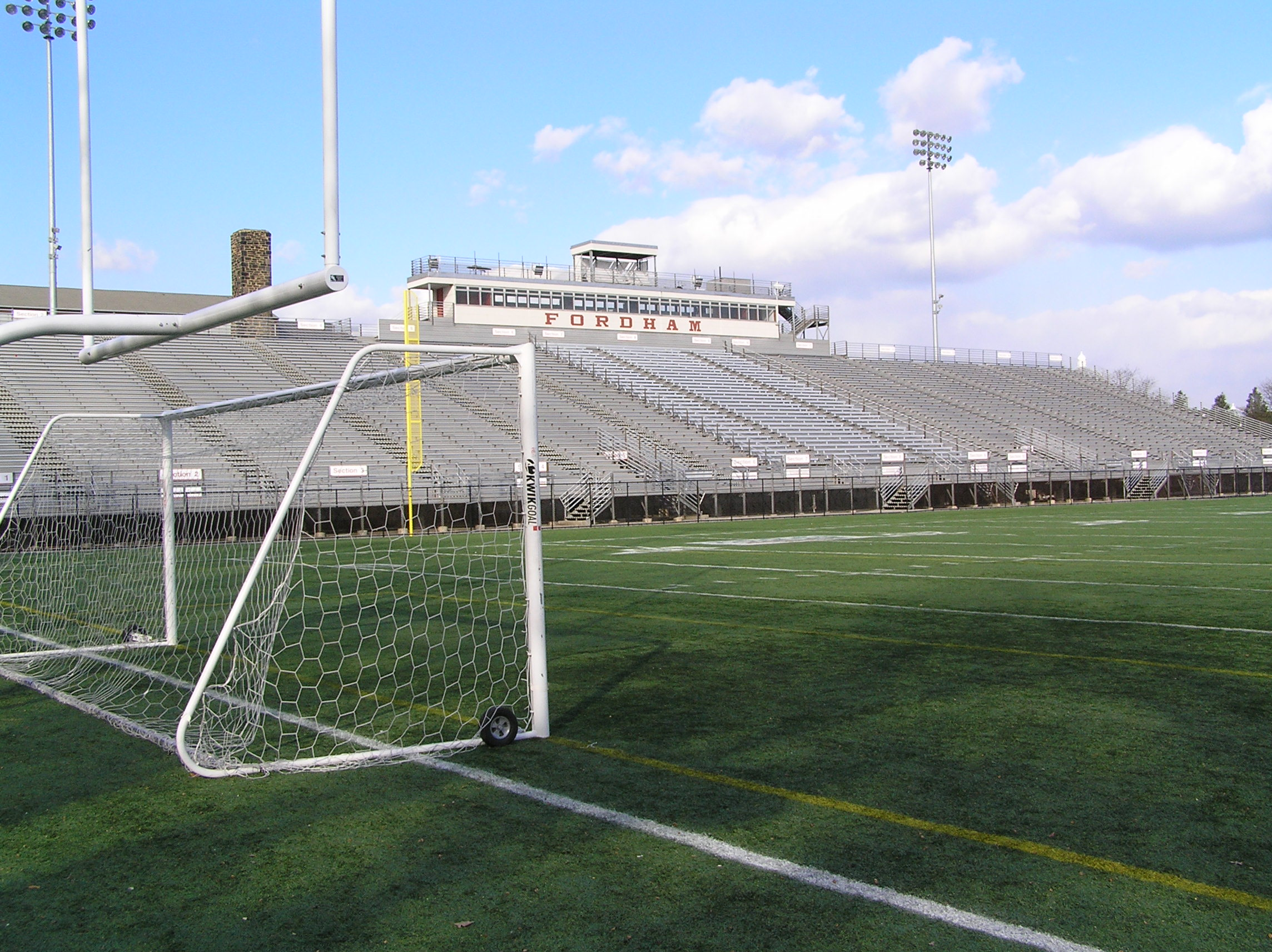
Jack Coffey Field, soccer venue

The team currently plays in the Atlantic 10 conference and reached the quarterfinals of the 2017 NCAA Division I men's soccer championships

==== Women ====
The team currently plays in the Atlantic 10 conference and has appeared in the Atlantic 10 Championship game in 2007 and 2015.

=== Softball ===
The Fordham softball program has been the most successful recent program for the Rams, winning seven of the past eight Atlantic 10 championships (2011, 2013, 2014, 2015, 2016, 2017, and 2018) and earning an NCAA championship berths in eight of the past nine years (2010, 2011, 2013, 2014, 2015, 2016, 2017, and 2018).

=== Swimming and diving ===
Fordham's Women's Swimming and Diving team was the first women's team to win an A10 championship. The men's swimming and diving team has also been successful in recent years.

=== Track and field ===
Johnny Gibson, a 1928 graduate of Fordham, broke the 440 yd (400 m) Hurdles World Record while at the school and made the 1928 Olympic team in the same event. Gibson is known as a great contributor to the world of track and field as a founding member of the New Jersey Track and Field Officials Association and head coach of men's track and field at Seton Hall University from 1945 to 1972. Sam Perry set the World Record for the 60-yard dash indoors at the Milrose Games in 1965.

Tom Courtney won Olympic gold in the 800 m run at the 1956 Games. While at Fordham Courtney had anchored the 2 mile relay that broke the world record in 1954.

Fordham track has had a resurgence in the past two decades with an All-Americans and numerous conference champions. Barry Cantrell earned all-American honors in the high jump in 1998. There have been several Atlantic 10 Conference champions including the jumping events, hammer throw. and the intermediate hurdles.

In 2008, the men's track and field team won the Outdoor Metropolitan Championship. The title was the first ever Metropolitan Athletic Conference team title captured by the Rams in the school's history. In the 2009 Outdoor Season the Rams defended their title, while the Women's squad captured second in the team scoring.

=== Water polo ===
Fordham's men's water polo team is an NCAA Division 1 program. They compete in the Collegiate Water Polo Association (CWPA) against Brown University, Connecticut College, Harvard University, Iona, MIT, Queens College, St. Francis College. In 2010 and 2009 they placed third and fifth in the CWPA Eastern Division championship. Their coach, Bill Harris, was awarded the CWPA Coach of the Year in 2009. Fordham University alumnus Chris Judge (class of 1980) was inducted into the CWPA Hall of Fame in 2010.

== Clubs ==
=== Crew ===
Men's crew has been a club sport at Fordham since 1915, when John Mulcahy (an alumnus and Olympic gold medalist in the sport) helped found it there. Fordham crew has since been quite successful, winning several national championships. The team is a member of the Dad Vail affiliation, making the Dad Vail Regatta the focus of its spring racing season. Exceptional crews have competed at the Intercollegiate Rowing Association (IRA) National Championships, Henley Royal Regatta, and the San Diego Crew Classic. The team is divided into novice and varsity squads. Fordham Athletics also sponsors a women's varsity team.

Fordham crew trains on the Harlem River. For many years the university maintained the last remaining boathouse on "sculler's row" off the river in Manhattan, along Sherman Creek, until it was destroyed by suspected arson in 1978. It has yet to be replaced. Currently, the club shares space at the Peter Jay Sharp Boathouse near Sherman Creek, the first community boathouse built in Manhattan in over 100 years. Since 1989, Fordham has medaled every year at the Dad Vail and other major collegiate regattas. During that period the team has had 9 undefeated seasons and 13 national championships: eight at the Dad Vail, three at the Eastern College Athletic Conference National Invitational Collegiate Regatta, one at the Division-I National Championships, and one at the IRA Championship. Fordham was the 2007 Dad Vail Champions in Men's Varsity Lightweight 4+ and the 2008 Dad Vail Champions in Men's Varsity Lightweight 8+.

=== Ice hockey ===
The university supports hockey as a club sport. The team was created in the 1967–68 season playing and winning one game versus cross-town rival Manhattan College. The "Maroon Six" as they were known then, began playing a full slate of games during the 1970–71 season. The team joined the Metropolitan Intercollegiate Hockey League, in the fall of 1970 and began playing such teams as Columbia, Fairfield and St. Johns. The team has held the longest tenure in the Metropolitan Collegiate Hockey Conference (MCHC) after the MIHL changed its name during the 1974–75 season. In February 2014, the Rams captured their third league championship with a 5-4 win over Suffolk Community College. Prior championships were in 2006 and 2011. The 2013-14 team finished the year with an overall record of 20-5-2-1, the third time in team history the squad has won 20 games. They also finished in first place for the third time in the previous five years, had 11 consecutive winning seasons (the longest in team history), and qualified for the post season play every year for the previous 14 seasons. The team also is a member of the American Collegiate Hockey Association (ACHA) which ranks club teams on a national basis.

The 2018-19 season was the Rams' most successful campaign to date. Aside from securing back to back (MCHC) championships, Fordham also won both of their games at regionals against Springfield College and George Mason University, sending the Rams to the ACHA National Championship tournament for the first time. Fordham won two games at Nationals, beating Florida Gulf Coast University and University of Nebraska, while their only loss came to the University of Michigan by one goal. Joe Sponenburg was named Atlantic Region MVP, and head coach Rich Guberti won Atlantic Coach of The Year. Sponenburg and fellow sophomore Connor Burke were voted to All-Atlantic teams, as was junior forward Zach Brenner.

In 2020, Fordham became a member of the Empire Collegiate Hockey Conference, "joining the most elite college club hockey league in the Atlantic region." In 2020, Fordham also began its first season as a member of the Collegiate Hockey Federation (CHF) "whose membership represents the highest level of competition on a national level." The team is coached by Rich Guberti, who was an assistant coach for two years and has been the head coach for the past eleven years. Until 2020, the team had gone 221-73-8-10 during this tenure.

=== Lacrosse ===
Founded in 1970, the lacrosse program has grown tremendously. After years as the top independent lacrosse team in the New York metropolitan area, the team has been accepted to be a member of the National College Lacrosse League. The Rams currently compete in the New York Metro Division.

=== Rugby ===
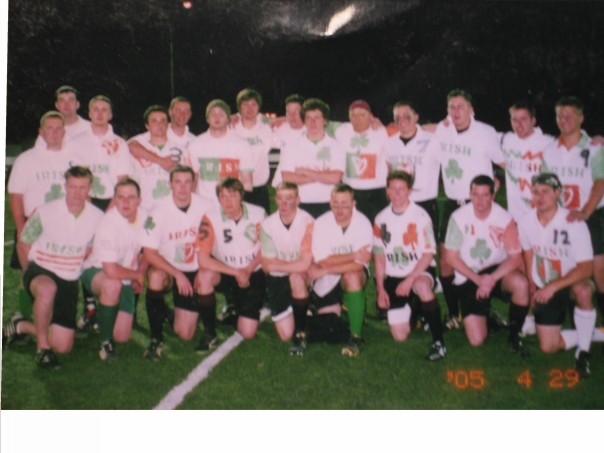
The Fordham "Irish" team pre-kickoff for the 2005 Spring Weekend rugby match

The university supports men's rugby as a club sport as a member of USA Rugby, and field within it Division I 'A' and 'B' side rugby squads.. The Fordham University Rugby Football Club plays in the Metropolitan New York Rugby Union of USA Rugby. Additionally, the Rose Hill Campus is host every spring to the "Irish-Italian" men's rugby game, a staple of Fordham's Spring Weekend festival. The men's team won the Metropolitan New York Rugby Union (METNY) D-1 conference championship in 2003, 2004 and 2009 and made it to the first round of the national tournament in 2004. Five years later they made an appearance in the second round of the national tournament in the fall of 2009. In the spring of 2009 Fordham Rugby were crowned champions of the annual Cherry Blossoms Tournament held in Washington DC.

The women's team is a three-time champion of the Big Apple Classic, which is hosted on Randalls Island, New York. They also won the 2004 East Coast Division 3 Collegiate Championship in the spring of 2005.

=== Sailing ===
Fordham is a member of the Middle Atlantic Intercollegiate Sailing Association (MAISA) district of the Intercollegiate Sailing Association (ICSA). The team's homeport is a recently bought boathouse off of Eastchester Bay, across from City Island, a few miles from its Rose Hill campus. During the 2014-2015 College Sailing season, Fordham, a club team, was ranked as high as 6th nationally amongst varsity programs. For the first time, both the Co-ed and Women's teams qualified for College Nationals in the spring of 2014. Newly hired coach Brendan Feeney has helped build the team further since, placing 18th at Open Fleet Race Nationals during the most recent Spring 2026 season.

== Nickname and mascot ==
During its early years, the sports teams were known as the Rose Hills, after the Rose Hill campus. During a 1883 baseball game against the United States Military Academy, students began cheering "One-Dam, Two-Dam, Three-Dam, Fordham!". The Jesuit fathers felt that it sounded "too ungentlemanly" and came up with "Ram" to replace "Dam". The "Rams" nickname became the official nickname after alumnus J. Ignatius Coveney composed the university fight song "The Fordham Ram" in 1906.

=== Ramses the Ram ===
The mascot is Ramses the Ram. Initially the university had a live ram but it has been replaced by a student wearing a ram costume.

From the 1920's onwards, Fordham had kept a live bighorn sheep on campus, each of whom were named Ramses and numbered accordingly. However, the rams were often the victims of kidnapping schemes by students from rival institutions before football games or other big match-ups, especially by nearby fellow Catholic institution and long-time athletic rivals Manhattan College. Rameses XIX made the local news when Manhattan College students kidnapped him, dyed him green (Manhattan College colors) and left him in front of the Madison Square Garden Circus. Ramses XXVIII was the last live mascot and had to be put down in 1978 due to gangrene caused by an injury. The university has never had a live mascot since then.
