= Salve Regina Seahawks =

- University: Salve Regina University
- Conferences: NEWMAC (primary); Commonwealth Coast Football; New England Intercollegiate Sailing Association
- NCAA: Division III
- Athletic director: Jody Mooradian
- Location: Newport, Rhode Island
- First year: 1980's
- Varsity teams: 20 (8 men's, 10 women's, 2 co-ed)
- Football stadium: Toppa Field at Freebody Park
- Basketball arena: Rodgers Recreation Center
- Ice hockey arena: Portsmouth Abbey Ice Rink (men's) and St. George's School Ice Rink (women's)
- Baseball stadium: Brother Michael Reynolds Field and Cardines Field (select games)
- Softball stadium: Toppa Field at Freebody Park
- Soccer stadium: Brother Michael Reynolds Field
- Lacrosse stadium: Gaudet Field
- Sailing venue: Fort Adams State Park
- Tennis venue: Salve Regina University Tennis Courts and the International Tennis Hall of Fame (select matches)
- Volleyball arena: Rodgers Recreation Center
- Mascot: Sammy the Seahawk
- Nickname: Seahawks
- Colors: Blue and green
- Website: https://salveathletics.com/
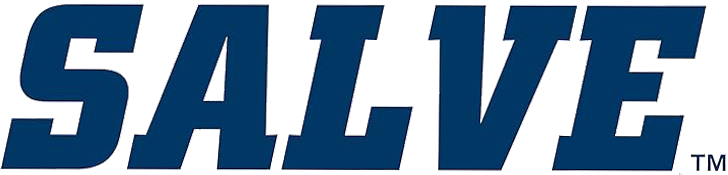

The Salve Regina Seahawks are the athletics teams of Salve Regina University, which compete on the NCAA Division III level and is a member of the Commonwealth Coast Conference and Commonwealth Coast Football. The university offers ten varsity sports for women (soccer, field hockey, tennis, cross country, basketball, ice hockey, volleyball, softball, track and field, and lacrosse), eight for men (football, cross country, soccer, basketball, ice hockey, tennis, baseball, and lacrosse), and one co-ed sport (sailing). Sailing is governed by the Inter-Collegiate Sailing Association, and its subdivision, the New England Intercollegiate Sailing Association.
The school also offers men's and women's rugby, governed by the Colonial Coast Rugby Conference, USA Rugby and the International Rugby Board. The men's rugby program competes at the Division III level, and the women's program competes on the Division III level in the National Small College Rugby Organization.

The university mascot is the Seahawk.

== History ==
Over the last eight seasons, the men's rugby team and the women's basketball team have enjoyed the greatest success, earning 8 conference championships, and 1 runner-up finishes in that time frame. In addition, the men's rugby, women's basketball, men's basketball, men's tennis, men’s hockey and sailing teams have all competed in national collegiate championship tournaments.

Although the sport does not permit easy comparisons with more traditional sports, the sailing team (co-ed) has been very successful against national powerhouse sailing programs.

== Varsity sports ==
Men's sports	Women's sports
Baseball	Basketball
Basketball	Cross country
Cross country	Field hockey
Football	Ice hockey
Ice hockey	Lacrosse
Lacrosse	Soccer
Soccer	Softball
Tennis	Tennis
	Track and field
	Volleyball
Co-ed sports
Equestrian
Sailing

== Conferences and opponents ==
The Commonwealth Coast Conference governs eight varsity sports for women (soccer, field hockey, tennis, cross country, basketball, volleyball, softball, and lacrosse) and eight for men (cross country, soccer, basketball, ice hockey, tennis, baseball, golf and lacrosse). The Conference will add football as a conference sport in 2017-18. Conference opponents include Curry, Eastern Nazarene, Gordon, Nichols, Endicott, Roger Williams, University of New England, Wentworth and Western New England College.

Sailing at Salve Regina is governed by the Intercollegiate Sailing Association and its subdivision, the New England Intercollegiate Sailing Association.

In 2012 the rugby teams moved into the newly formed Colonial Coast Rugby Conference, where the men and women compete nationally at the National Small College Rugby Organization (Division III). The Salve Regina Men’s Rugby team won the national championship in Spring 2012.

== Club sports ==
Salve Regina's club sports include golf, men's and women's rugby, swimming, volleyball, soccer, women's basketball, ping pong, and e-sports

== Notable alumni ==
- Damian Costantino, (baseball) NCAA record holder with hits in 60 consecutive games.
