= Fearsome =

Fearsome may refer to:

- Fearsome Creatures of the Lumberwoods, With a Few Desert and Mountain Beasts
- Fearsome critters, term from early lumberjack folklore for a variety of mythical beasts
- Fearsome Five, fictional group of comic book supervillains from DC Comics
- Fearsome Four, college rugby national championship tournament
- Fearsome Foursome (American football), title used in reporting American Professional Football
- Fearsome Foursome (comics), a supervillain group from Marvel Comics

== See also ==
- Feersum Endjinn, science fiction novel by Scottish writer Iain M. Banks
