= EPRU =

EPRU may refer to:

- Eastern Pennsylvania Rugby Union, a geographical unit for rugby union teams in Eastern and Central Pennsylvania
- Eastern Province Rugby Union, the governing body of rugby union in the Eastern Cape, including professional team the Eastern Province Elephants
