= Georgetown University Rugby Football Club =

(United States) Georgetown
- Union: National Collegiate Rugby
- Nickname: Hoya Ruggers
- Founded: 1967; 59 years ago
- Region: Mid-Atlantic Rugby Football Union
- Ground: Cooper Field (Capacity: 2,500)
- President: Gus Dot
- Coach(es): Arno Van Der Spek, Julian Graham, Craig Rowlings, Jeff Ferrigno, Brian Ferrigno, Dacoda Worth, Howard Chang, Josh Brady, Mark Ingram
- Captain: drew Malone
- League: Mid-Atlantic Rugby Conference
Team kit

Official website
- www.gurfc.com

The Georgetown University Rugby Football Club is the intercollegiate men's rugby union team that represents Georgetown University in the Mid-Atlantic Rugby Conference of National Collegiate Rugby, Division II. They have twice reached the USA Rugby National Tournament Final Four, in 2005 and 2009.

== Early history ==
The Georgetown University Rugby Football Club (GURFC) was founded in the spring semester of 1967 by Michael Murphy and Pat Kaufmann, former members of the Washington D.C. Rugby Football Club. The key founder was a Georgetown University Law student Michael Murphy, assisted by Kaufmann, a Georgetown undergrad. In the early history of the Yes, GURFC fielded both “A” and “B” sides, while occasionally mustering the numbers for a “C” side. The team played a variety of teams in its early years including Yes, the Washington RFC, the Baltimore RFC and the Quantico Marines RFC. The team also played the Yes, as well as a visiting university team from Chile. In the fall of 1968, GURFC hired its first coach to the Yes, which only lasted until the Spring. During this time, John Clisham worked as the club president and Kevin Sullivan acted as Social Yes.

Georgetown Rugby set on a self-directed course in the PRU. The team rallied under the coaching and playing leadership of Dave Pegno and his housemates. The team completed a .500 season in 1986. The 1990 team featured PRU all-stars and took advantage of Springbok coaching expertise from Heyn van Rooyen and Theo van Wyk.

Georgetown graduate students have played on the Georgetown Law Rugby Football Club since 2005. Current USA Rugby rules prevent graduate students from playing on the official university teams, despite the fact that most collegiate rugby clubs in the nation were started by graduate students. Despite its name, the Georgetown Law RFC is open to all Georgetown graduate programs.

== Evolution of the Officers ==
In the early days of the club, the “officers” consisted of a scrum captain, a backs captain, a president, a VP/Treasurer, and a secretary. The 5 "officers" would determine the A, B, and C side rosters each week. In 1970-1971, John Kelly was president, Jack Schmidt was the (Match) Secretary, Joe Pulosi and Mike (Last Name Unknown) were the captains, and Leonard Natoli, Jr. served as the Vice President/Treasurer. At the time, the Vice President's role was to co-ordinate social events. The officers have remained relatively unchanged over time except for the division of the duties of Vice President and Treasurer into the three posts of Treasurer, Vice President, and Social Chair. Along the way, it was deemed necessary to separate the Social activities from the Financial responsibilities.

After adjustments to the club constitution in 2021 and 2022, the current board is composed of 9 members, ranked in terms of seniority: Captain, President, Treasurer, Social Chair, Match Secretary, Webmaster(social media chair), Alumni Relations Chair, Vice President, and Recruitment chair. Elections occur during town hall meetings at the end of every fall semester.

== Recent Seasons ==
The 2001 fall season marked Georgetown's last year in Division I. The 2001 season was a building year for the team. The spring and fall 2002 seasons marked a new start for Georgetown that began with a last minute victory over Catholic University in the Capitol Cup tournament.

During the fall of 2002, Georgetown moved from Division I to Division II. They subsequently won the Potomac Rugby Union's Division II championship.

Since 2004, the Club has been a sponsor of the annual Run For Rigby to raise money for off-campus housing safety awareness.

That same season, Georgetown shut out Salisbury University in the PRU championship, avenging their last minute loss to Salisbury in 2003.

The spring 2005 season marked Georgetown's championship run into Final Four of the USA Rugby National Tournament.

During the Spring 2009 season, Georgetown did not participate in the annual Capitol Cup tournament due to a scheduling conflict with the National D2 Playoffs.

Georgetown in 2009 defeated #1 seed Cal Maritime, 20-17, in the quarterfinals to advance to the National D2 semifinals. This marks the second time in school history that the Hoya Ruggers have reached the Final Four of the USA Rugby National Tournament.

In 2013, the club formally organized a competitive Rugby Sevens side which placed 11th out of 24 teams in the Las Vegas Invitational. In 2014, 2016 and 2017 the sevens team won the James River Christmas Sevens tournament in Richmond, VA, held annually in December. In February 2015, the side went on to win the Bowl Championship at the Las Vegas Invitational with a record of four wins and two losses.

In the fall of 2016, the club moved up to Division 1AA Chesapeake Collegiate Rugby Conference.

In 2019, the club won its first Cherry Blossom Tournament Championship since 2014, beating D1 conference rivals Towson and Maryland in the process.

In 2020, the club dropped down to the Division II Mid-Atlantic Rugby Conference in National Collegiate Rugby. The transition was led by Club President Jack Keeler (‘21) and Captain TJ Gletner (‘21).

In the 2021/22 season, the year after the COVID-19 pandemic, the club won five trophies. In the fall of 2021, the 15s team won the Mid-Atlantic Regional Conference (MARC) and lost in the Elite Eight of the National Championship. In the spring of 2022, the club won the Cherry Blossom Tournament, Capitol Cup, and the MARC 7s Championship. The 7s team lost in the Elite Eight of the National Championship 7s tournament, too.

In the spring 2023 season, the team achieved a string of four consecutive conference championships by defeating Scranton in the MARC 7s championship. This victory sent GURFC to the nationals tournament in Boyds, Maryland, where the team achieved a joint 3/4 place with Norwich following a close semi-final defeat to NC State. This came after victories over UNCW, University of Chicago, and Memphis.

== 1st XV 2024-2025 ==
Position	Name	Nationality	High School
1	Dominic Wright	(United States)	Lakeville High School
2	Jack Daly	(United States)	St. Sebastian's School
3	Domenic Petrosinelli	(United States)	Staples High School
4	Broderick Lee	(United States)	Roxbury Latin School
5	Gus Dotson	(United States)	Elisabeth Irwin High School
6	George Egan	(United States)	Creighton Preparatory School
7	Jack Lonergan	(United Kingdom)	Winchester College
8	Aubrey Aird	(United Kingdom)	Eton College
9	Joel Saxon	(United States)	Delbarton School
10	Conor Sippel	(Hong Kong)	German Swiss International School
11	Jack Duncan	(United States)	Polytechnic School
12	Gavin Brady (C)	(United States)	Gonzaga College High School
13	Quinn Zebrowski	(United States)	Delbarton School
14	Anthony Altobelli IV	(United States)	St. John's High School
15	Matthew Mancini	(United States)	Fairfield College Preparatory School

7s Squad 2025

Position	Name	Nationality	High School
1	Andrew Maloney (C)	(United States)	Fordham Preparatory School
2	Gavin Brady (C)	(United States)	Gonzaga College High School
3	Conor Sippel	(Hong Kong)	German Swiss International School
4	Matthew Mancini	(United States)	Fairfield College Preparatory School
5	Quinn Zebrowski	(United States)	Delbarton School
6	Anthony Altobelli IV	(United States)	St. John's High School
7	Reid Spence	(United States)	Roxbury Latin School
Subs			
8	Will Miller	(United States)	Gonzaga College High School
9	Jack Duncan	(United States)	Polytechnic School
10	Lucas Barsantini	(Uruguay)	Gonzaga College High School
11	Brodie Lee	(United States)	Roxbury Latin School
12	Joel Saxon	(United States)	Delbarton School

== Championships and Titles ==
- 2023 NCR Rugby National Championship 7s Tournament, Division II, Semifinalist
- 2022 NCR Rugby National Championship 7s Tournament, Division II, Quarterfinalist
- 2021 NCR Rugby National Championship 15s Tournament, Division II, Quarterfinalist
- 2009 USA Rugby National Championship Tournament, Division II, Semifinalist
- 2005 USA Rugby National Championship Tournament, Division II, Semifinalist
- 2022 Mid-Atlantic Rugby Football Union Championship Tournament, Division II, 7s Champions
- 2021 Mid-Atlantic Rugby Football Union Championship Tournament, Division II, 15s Champions
- 2005 Mid-Atlantic Rugby Football Union Championship Tournament, Division II, Champions

- 2009 Potomac Rugby Union, Division II, Champions
- 2004 Potomac Rugby Union, Division II, Champions
- 2002 Potomac Rugby Union, Division II, Champions
- 1989 Potomac Rugby Union, Lower Matrix, Champions
- 1987 Potomac Rugby Union, Lower Matrix, Champions
- 2022 Capitol Cup Champions
- 2019 Capitol Cup Champions
- 2018 Capitol Cup Champions
- 2016 Capitol Cup Champions
- 2013 Capitol Cup Champions
- 2012 Capitol Cup Champions
- 2011 Capitol Cup Champions
- 2010 Capitol Cup Champions
- 2008 Capitol Cup Champions
- 2007 Capitol Cup Champions
- 2006 Capitol Cup Champions
- 2005 Capitol Cup Champions
- 2004 Capitol Cup Champions
- 2003 Capitol Cup Champions
- 2002 Capitol Cup Champions
- 2001 Capitol Cup Champions
- 2000 Capitol Cup Champions
- 1999 Capitol Cup Champions
- 1998 Capitol Cup Champions
- 1992 Capitol Cup Champions
- 1991 Capitol Cup Champions
- 1990 Capitol Cup Champions

== Tournament Championships ==
- 2022 Cherry Blossom Tournament Champions
- 2019 Cherry Blossom Tournament Champions
- 2014 Cherry Blossom Tournament Champions
- 2013 Cherry Blossom Tournament Runner-Up
- 2011 Cherry Blossom Tournament Champions
- 2008 Cherry Blossom Tournament Champions
- 2005 Cherry Blossom Tournament Champions
- 2004 New Orleans Mardi Gras Tournament Champions
