= Charles Guthrie (athletic director) =

American athletic director

Current position
- Title: Athletic director
- Team: Fordham Rams
- Conference: Atlantic 10

Biographical details
- Born: Albany, New York, U.S.
- Education: Syracuse University; University at Albany, SUNY

Charles Guthrie is the athletic director at Fordham University. He previously held the same position at the University of Akron, University of Wisconsin-Green Bay, San Francisco State University, and Clark College.

== Early life and education ==
Guthrie grew up in Albany, New York and graduated from Watervliet High School in 1990. He played basketball at Onondaga Community College before transferring and earning a B.A. from Syracuse University and a master’s degree in education administration and policy studies from the University at Albany.

== Career ==
Guthrie began his career in 1998 as an intern at Eastern College Athletic Conference (ECAC) in Cape Cod, Massachusetts. In 2004, he completed the NCAA Fellows Leadership Development Program. After stops at Colgate University, Columbia University, Cal State San Marcos, University of California, San Diego and California State University, Los Angeles, he landed his first AD position in 2011 at Clark College in Vancouver, Washington. Under his leadership, 10 of 11 sports programs at Clark College made post-season appearances in 2013.

He then served as the athletic director of the San Francisco State Gators from 2014 to 2017. Guthrie’s tenure as the head of the Gators athletic department was a short one, but he accomplished a great deal in that time. Annual giving doubled during his tenure and Guthrie was also successful in securing a $2 million gift, the largest one-time individual gift to San Francisco State athletics.

Additionally, the 2016-17 season men’s basketball team finished with a record of 25-6, their best since 1940.

In 2017, Guthrie was named the 9th athletic director at University of Wisconsin-Green Bay, where he was responsible for managing 14 NCAA Division I athletic programs as a member of the Horizon League Conference. He hired men’s basketball coach Will Ryan in 2020.

In 2021, he was hired by former Green Bay chancellor Gary Miller to lead the Akron Zips. During his first year with the Zips, the four teams won MAC Championships, hired Oregon Ducks offensive coordinator Joe Moorhead as the football head coach, and the basketball team won the Mid-American Conference Championship to earn a March Madness berth against UCLA. His daughters are Michela and Chailoh Guthrie.
