= Furman Paladins golf =

- University: Furman University
- Conference: Southern Conference
- Head coach: Men's: Todd Satterfield (21st season); Women's: Jeff Hull (2nd season)
- Location: Greenville, South Carolina
- Course: Furman Golf Club; Par: 72; Yards: 7,004
- Nickname: Furman Paladins
- Colors: Royal purple and white

NCAA champions
- Women: 1976 (AIAW)

NCAA runner-up
- Women: 1987

NCAA Championship appearances
- Men: 1977, 1986; Women: 1983, 1984, 1985, 1986, 1987, 1990, 1992, 1993, 1994, 1995, 1996, 1997, 1999, 2004, 2005, 2008, 2016, 2017, 2018, 2019

Conference champions
- Men: 1970, 1973, 1975, 1976, 1977, 1984, 1985, 1986, 1988, 1993, 1997, 2004, 2010; Women: 1994, 1995, 1996, 1997, 1998, 1999, 2000, 2001, 2002, 2004, 2005, 2008, 2009, 2015, 2016, 2017, 2018, 2019

Individual conference champions
- Men: Heyward Sullivan (1959), Walt Smith (1962), David Strawn (1969, 1970), Ken Ezell (1975, 1976, 1977), Brad Faxon (1983), Eddie Kirby (1984), Todd White (1988), Nick Cifelli (1993), Jordan Byrd (1997), Matt Davidson (2004), Austin Reeves (2010); Women: Caroline Peek (1994), Dawn Turner (1995, 1996), Diana D'Alessio (1997), Jen Hanna (1998), Jennifer Perri (2000, 2001), Brandi Jackson (2002), Sarah Johnston (2004), Jenny Suh (2005), Blair Lamb (2007), Stefanie Kenoyer (2008, 2009), Taylor Totland (2015), Alice Chen (2016), Natalie Srinivasan (2017), Reona Hirai (2018)

The Furman Paladins golf teams represent Furman University located in Greenville, South Carolina, and compete in National Collegiate Athletic Association (NCAA) Division I and the Southern Conference (SoCon). The Paladins women's golf team is consistently ranked in the top 25 by Golfweek.

== History ==
=== Men ===
- Southern Conference champions (13): 1970, 1973, 1975, 1976, 1977, 1984, 1985, 1986, 1988, 1993, 1997, 2004, 2010
- NCAA Regionals (4): 1997 – 14th, 2002 – 21st, 2004 – 18th, 2010 – 11th
- NCAA Championships (2): 1977 – 18th, 1986 – 19th

=== Women ===
| Year | Conference | Regionals | NCAA/AIAW |
|---|---|---|---|
| 1974 | - | - | 3rd |
| 1975 | - | - | 5th |
| 1976 | - | - | 1st |
| 1977 | - | - | 3rd |
| 1978 | - | - | 23rd |
| 1979 | - | - | - |
| 1980 | - | - | 20th |
| 1981 | - | - | - |
| 1982 | - | - | 13th |
| 1983 | - | - | 9th |
| 1984 | - | - | 3rd |
| 1985 | - | - | 4th |
| 1986 | - | - | 16th |
| 1987 | - | - | 2nd |
| 1988 | - | - | - |
| 1989 | - | - | - |
| 1990 | - | - | 15th |
| 1991 | - | - | - |
| 1992 | - | - | 11th |
| 1993 | - | 2nd | 6th |
| 1994 | 1st | 3rd | 11th |
| 1995 | 1st | 2nd | 6th |
| 1996 | 1st | 3rd | 13th |
| 1997 | 1st | 4th | 16th |
| 1998 | 1st | 11th | - |
| 1999 | 1st | 2nd | 15th |
| 2000 | 1st | 14th | - |
| 2001 | 1st | 16th | - |
| 2002 | 1st | 13th | - |
| 2003 | 2nd | 9th | - |
| 2004 | 1st | 6th | 15th |
| 2005 | 1st | 3rd | 21st |
| 2006 | 4th | 17th | - |
| 2007 | 2nd | 11th | - |
| 2008 | 1st | 8th | 24th |
| 2009 | 1st | 14th | - |
| 2010 | 5th | 16th | - |
| 2011 | 3rd | - | - |
| 2012 | 4th | - | - |
| 2013 | 2nd | - | - |
| 2014 | 2nd | - | - |
| 2015 | 1st | 10th | - |
| 2016 | 1st | 4th | 20th |
| 2017 | 1st | 2nd | 12th |
| 2018 | 1st | 3rd | 11th |
| 2019 | 1st | TBD | TBD |

== Tour professionals ==
=== Men ===
- Brad Faxon, eight PGA Tour wins, 2 Champions Tour wins
- Bruce Fleisher, one PGA Tour win, 18 Champions Tour wins

=== Women ===
- Beth Daniel, 33 LPGA Tour wins (one major)
- Kathleen Ekey, two Futures Tour wins
- Betsy King, 34 LPGA Tour wins, (six majors)
- Dottie Pepper, 17 LPGA Tour wins, (two majors)
- Beth Solomon, one LPGA Tour wins
- Sherri Turner, 3 LPGA Tour wins, (one major)
- Maggie Will, 3 LPGA Tour wins

== Furman Golf Club ==
The Furman Golf Club has been voted #1 Public Golf Course in the Upstate by the South Carolina Golf Ratings Panel, ranked No. 16 in Golfweek's "Best Campus Courses” in 2015 and has received a 3.5 star ranking from Golf Digest. It is also where Furman alums and professional golfers Betsy King, Beth Daniel, Dottie Pepper and Brad Faxon honed their college games.

The par-72 layout underwent a major renovation in 2008, where all 18 greens were reconstructed under USGA specifications and reseeded with Champion UltraDwarf Bermudagrass. A long-term master plan, implemented in 2010, has led to a new practice facility for the Furman golf teams, enhanced public practice facilities, new tees to accommodate golfers of all levels, bunker strategy improvement, refurbished cart paths, irrigation upgrades, major drainage installation and clubhouse enhancements. The course now also qualifies as a PGA Family Course.
