= NCR XVs Champions Cup =

- Current season, competition or edition: 2024
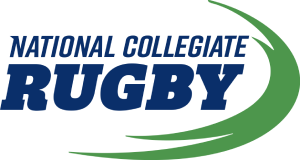
- Sport: Rugby union
- Founded: 2002; 24 years ago
- First season: 2002
- No. of teams: 249
- Most recent champion: Brown (2024)
- Most titles: Furman (3 titles)
- Website: https://www.ncr.rugby/nationals/2024-mens-championship-division-i

The NCR XVs Champions Cup is a single-elimination tournament played each year in the United States featuring men's college rugby teams from National Collegiate Rugby (formerly National Small College Rugby Organization) to determine the national championship.

From 2002 to 2006, event name was "East Coast Division 3 Collegiate Championship". In 2007, event was renamed to "NSCRO Men's Collegiate Division 3 National Championship", and "Champions Cup" since 2012.

== Results ==
Year	Champion	Runner-Up	3rd Place	4th Place	Finals venue	Ref.
2002	Western Carolina	Stonehill	Lehigh	Old Dominion	Bethlehem, PA	
2003	Furman	Stonehill	Franklin & Marshall	Wake Forest	Cherry Hill, NJ	
2004	Furman	Central Connecticut	Albright	Bentley	Cherry Hill, NJ	
2005	Furman	Duke	Western Connecticut	Lehigh University	Greenville, SC	
2006	Bentley	The Citadel	Franklin & Marshall	Virginia Commonwealth	Richmond, VA	
2007	Bentley	Furman	Longwood	Allegheny	Wake Forest	
2008	Plymouth State	Furman	Widener	Hamilton	Hamilton College	
2009	Longwood	Coastal Carolina	SUNY Oswego	Salve Regina	South Jersey Rugby Football Club	
2010	Penn State Berks	Keene State	Louisiana–Lafayette	William Paterson	Virginia Beach Sportsplex	
2011	Longwood	Occidental	Salve Regina	Ithaca	Virginia Beach Sportsplex	
2012	Salve Regina	California State Maritime	Franciscan	North Florida	Infinity Park	
2013	Saint John's (Minn.)	Duke	New England	Denver	Infinity Park	
2014	Saint John's	New England	Denver	Mount St. Mary's	Infinity Park	
2015	New England	Mount St. Mary's	Saint John's	California State Maritime	Infinity Park	
2016	Mount St. Mary's	Claremont	Southern Indiana	Eastern Connecticut	Infinity Park	
2017	Claremont	Tufts	Xavier	Louisiana State	Infinity Park	
2018	Iowa Central	Claremont	Salve Regina	Loyola (Maryland)	Life University	
2019	Claremont	Christendom	Saint John's	Endicott	Siena College	
2020	(not held due to COVID-19 pandemic) (Note: Loyola University Maryland ranked as #1 in National Final Poll.)				Life	
2021	Christendom	New Mexico Tech	Holy Cross	Saint John's	Aveva Stadium, Houston	
2022	Brown	Queens			Aveva Stadium, Houston	
2023	Notre Dame College	St. Bonaventure	Brown	Indiana	Aveva Stadium, Houston	
2024	Brown	Queens	St. Bonaventure; Wheeling		Aveva Stadium, Houston	

== See also ==
- College rugby
- Division 1-A Rugby
- Intercollegiate sports team champions
