= Cooper Field =

Stadium in Washington, D.C.

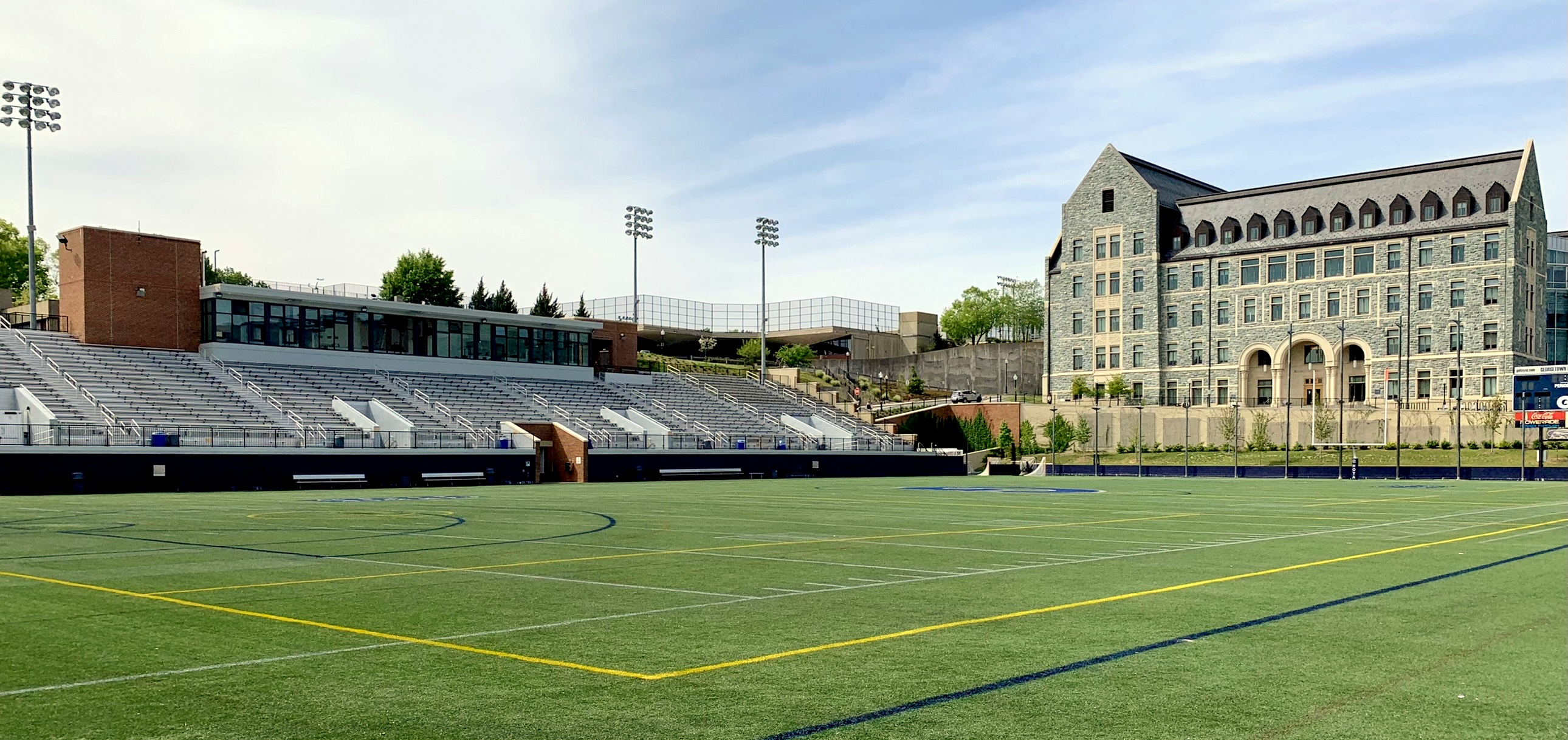
- Cooper Field in 2022, with the business school to the right
- Interactive map of Cooper Field
- Former names: Harbin Field (2002–2004); Multi-Sport Field (2005–2015)
- Location: Washington, D.C., U.S.
- Coordinates: 38°54′29″N 77°04′31″W
- Owner: Georgetown University
- Capacity: 4,418
- Surface: Artificial turf

Construction
- Opened: 2005; 21 years ago
- Cost: $22 million
- Architect: Hughes Group Architects

Tenants
- Georgetown Hoyas (NCAA) teams: Football; Men's lacrosse; Women's lacrosse

Website
- guhoyas.com/cooperfield

Cooper Field, formerly known as Harbin Field and Multi-Sport Field, is a 4,418-seat multi-purpose stadium in Washington, D.C., on the campus of Georgetown University. The field was originally used for intramurals and was adopted for soccer in 1994 as Harbin Field. The name was changed to "Multi-Sport Field", a placeholder pending final construction, to reflect the football team's use of the field starting in 2003. In 2015, Georgetown changed the name to Cooper Field in honor of a $50 million gift from Georgetown football parents Peter and Susan Cooper which funded athletic leadership programs at Georgetown and construction upgrades to the field.

== Unfinished construction ==
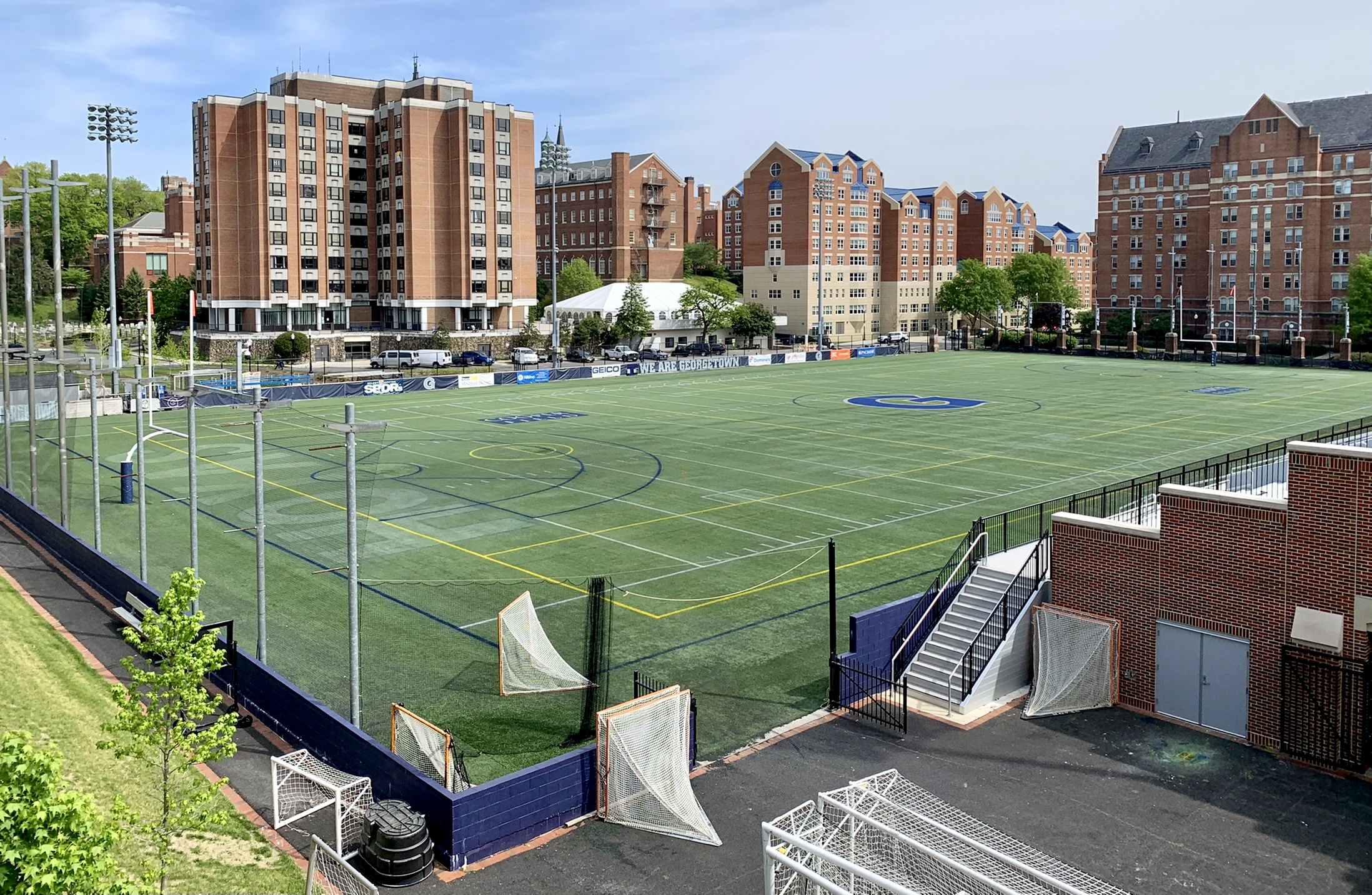
Cooper Field and its surroundings

The field has been awaiting further construction since 2005, when work was halted on completing permanent bleachers and other facilities. As a result, it remains the smallest stadium in all of NCAA Division I Football Bowl Subdivision or Football Championship subdivisions.

During the 2018 and 2019 seasons, attendance was reduced to 1,800 pending ongoing construction.

Several of the school athletics teams play home games there, including the Hoyas football team, the men's and women's lacrosse teams, the women's field hockey team, and the Georgetown University Rugby Football Club. The professional Washington Bayhawks of Major League Lacrosse used the field for most of their games during the 2007 season. Lights were installed on the field in early 2009. The surface is artificial, made of FieldTurf.

== See also ==
- List of NCAA Division I FCS football stadiums
