= NSCRO Women's National Championship =

- Sport: Rugby union
- Founded: 2003
- No. of teams: 122
- Website: NSCRO

The Women's National Championship is a single-elimination tournament played each year in the United States featuring women's college rugby teams from the National Small College Rugby Organization to determine the national championship.

From 2003 to 2006, event name was "East Coast Division 3 Collegiate Championship".

Effective August 2012, Small College Championship nomenclature replaced Division 3.

== Champions ==
Year	Champion	Runner-Up
2003	The College of New Jersey	Stonehill College
2004	Fordham University	Susquehanna University
2005	Castleton University	Susquehanna University
2006	Babson College	Ursinus College
2007 (Spring)	Stonehill College	University of Pennsylvania
2007 (Fall)	Stonehill College	Marist College
2008	Bryant University	Gettysburg College
2009	MIT	East Stroudsburg University of Pennsylvania
2010	Bentley University	Drexel University
2011	Carleton College	Lock Haven University of Pennsylvania
2012	Wayne State College	Roger Williams University
2013	Wayne State College	Smith College
2014	Roger Williams University	Sacred Heart University
2015	Minnesota State University Moorhead	Colgate University
2016	Wayne State College	Colgate University
2017	Wayne State College	Bentley University
2018	Wayne State College	Catholic University of America
