= Furman Paladins =

Intercollegiate sports teams of Furman University

- University: Furman University
- Conference: SoCon (primary); Big South (women's lacrosse)
- NCAA: Division I (FCS)
- Athletic director: Jason Donnelly
- Location: Greenville, South Carolina
- Varsity teams: 18 (8 men's, 10 women's)
- Football stadium: Paladin Stadium
- Basketball arena: Timmons Arena
- Softball stadium: Pepsi Stadium
- Soccer stadium: Stone Stadium
- Tennis venue: Mickel Tennis Center
- Outdoor track and field venue: Irwin Belk Complex
- Volleyball arena: Alley Gymnasium
- Nickname: Paladins
- Colors: Royal purple and white
- Website: furmanpaladins.com
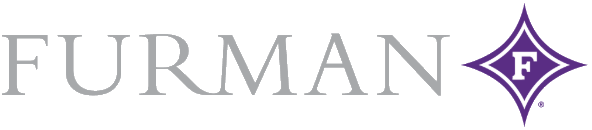

The Furman Paladins are the varsity athletic teams representing Furman University in Greenville, South Carolina, in intercollegiate athletics.

Furman competes in NCAA Division I athletics and is one of the smallest NCAA Division I schools in the nation. The university sponsors sixteen teams including football, women's lacrosse, men and women's basketball, cross country, golf, soccer, tennis, softball, track and field, and volleyball; and recently discontinued baseball and men's lacrosse. The Paladins are currently members of the Southern Conference. The university also fields 16 club sports and many intramural teams.

In 2018, Furman placed in the top 75 best colleges in the NACDA Directors' Cup Division I Final Standings, being the only liberal arts college in the US and only member of the Southern Conference to do so. In the 2019–2020 season, Furman finished in 32nd place in the NACDA Director's Cup Final Fall Standings.

== Sponsored sports ==
Men's sports	Women's sports
Basketball	Basketball
Cross country	Cross country
Football	Golf
Golf	Lacrosse
Soccer	Soccer
Tennis	Softball
Track and field^{†}	Tennis
	Track and field^{†}
	Volleyball
† – Track and field includes both indoor and outdoor.

A member of the Southern Conference, Furman sponsors teams in eight men's and ten women's NCAA sanctioned sports:

=== Football ===
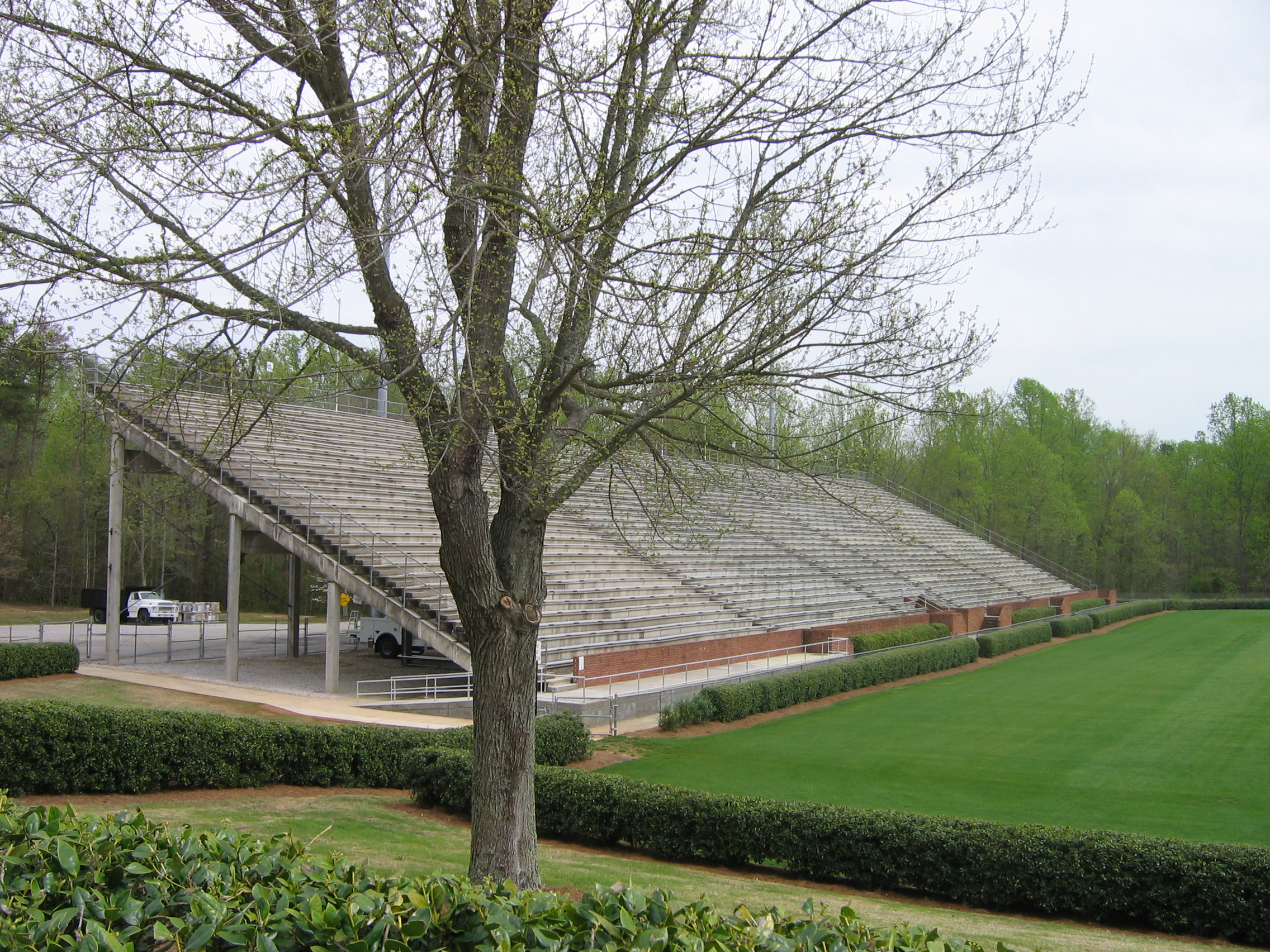
Paladin Stadium, home of the football team

In 1988 Furman won the NCAA I-AA National Football Championship. Furman was also a runner-up in the 1985 and 2001 NCAA I-AA National Football Championship game losing to Georgia Southern and Montana respectively, and a semifinalist in 1983, 1989 and 2005. Furman, Colgate, Lehigh, Fordham, Richmond and Villanova remain the only private universities that have appeared in the I-AA Football Championship game, and Furman was the first private school to win it, with Richmond becoming the second 20 years later. Furman also ranks 5th in NCAA Division I FCS playoff appearances with 18 appearances.

Over the past few years, Furman's football team has been consistently ranked in the top three spots in the NCAA I-AA polls, and has climbed to no. 1 in the nation in the Sports Network polls. The Paladins have also claimed 15 Southern Conference football titles, more than any school in league history. Furman has only won one national championship in football.

=== Men's basketball ===
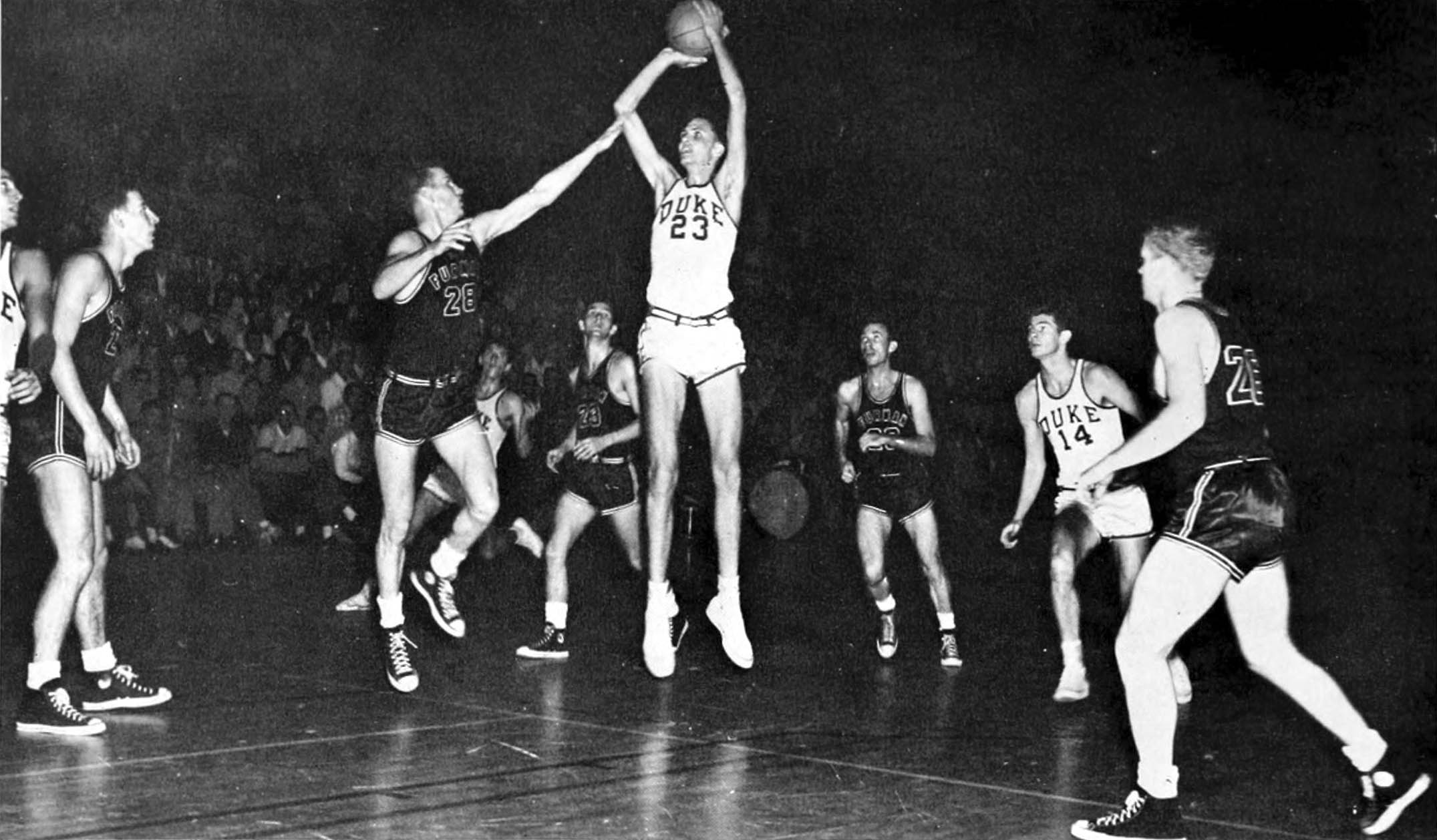
Furman (in dark shirts) v Duke game in 1954

The men's basketball team is currently led by head coach Bob Richey and play their home games at the Timmons Arena. Furman's best decade has been 1970–1980 when the team made 6 appearances to the NCAA Division I men's basketball tournament and made the Sweet Sixteen round in the 1974 NCAA Division I Basketball Tournament. In 2018, the Paladins entered the College Basketball AP Poll for the first time in program history, ranking #23 in the nation in the 2018–19 NCAA Division I men's basketball rankings on December 10.

The Paladins appeared in the 2023 NCAA Tournament after a 43-year tournament absence, advancing to the second round after winning their first tournament game in 49 years.

=== Women's basketball ===
The Paladins began play in 1969. As of the end of the 2015–16 season, they have an all-time record of 535–577. In their two NCAA Tournament appearances, they lost in the first round each time, 90–52 to Louisiana Tech and 90–38 to Tennessee, respectively. They lost 74–68 to Auburn in their only WNIT appearance in 2014.

=== Golf ===
==== Women's golf ====
SoCon's logo in Furman's colors

Few collegiate woman golf programs have produced more professionals than Furman, which has 11 former Lady Paladins on the LPGA Tour, including two World Golf Hall of Fame inductees (Betsy King and Beth Daniel). Furman has claimed 18 Southern Conference championships: 1994–2002, 2004–05, 2008–09, 2015–2019.

Furman won the AIAW national championship (which became the NCAA Championship in 1983) in 1976 and finished 3rd in 1974, 5th in 1975 and 3rd in 1977. Since 1983 it has made 19 appearances in the NCAA Women's Golf Championship, placing 2nd in 1987 and finishing 10 times in the top 12.

In recent years, Furman's women's golf has been consistently ranked in the top 10 in the nation by Golfweek In the 2019–20 season, Furman's Natalie Srinivasan ended as the top ranked collegiate golfer in the nation according to Golfstat and was the recipient of the 2020 Annika Award.

==== Men's golf ====
The men's golf team has won 13 Southern Conference championships: 1970, 1973, 1975–1977, 1984–86, 1988, 1993, 1997, 2004, 2010. PGA Tour players Brad Faxon and Bruce Fleisher played for the Paladins. The program nearly faced extinction in 2014 until a group of alumni led by Faxon helped keep the program going.

=== Soccer ===
Coached by Doug Allison, the men's soccer team has been ranked as high as no. 3 in the nation and has produced a share of professional players. Former star Clint Dempsey, who now plays club soccer for Seattle Sounders FC in Major League Soccer, is the #1 all-time leading goal scorer for the US team and, including goals scored at the 2006 FIFA World Cup in Germany, the 2010 FIFA World Cup in South Africa and the 2014 FIFA World Cup in Brazil; and the all-time American scorer in the European league. Ricardo Clark, a member of the United States Men's National Soccer Team and Houston Dynamo also played soccer for Furman. Current MLS players Shea Salinas of the San Jose Earthquakes, Chris Klute of the Colorado Rapids, Jonathan Leathers of Vancouver Whitecaps FC, and Walker Zimmerman of FC Dallas and member of the United States National Soccer team also played for the Paladins.

=== Tennis ===
==== Men's tennis ====
Furman men's tennis coach Paul Scarpa is the all-time winningest coach in American college tennis history, with a record spanning over 850 wins. A Florida State alumnus, he is a member of the ITA Men's Collegiate Hall of Fame, South Carolina Tennis Hall of Fame and USTA Southern Section Hall of Fame. He also developed the current dual-match scoring system adopted by the NCAA since 1993 and is the inventor of the clay-court line Tenex tape used to mark clay courts throughout the world.

Scarpa captured coached 108 All-Southern Conference players in his career at Furman. Notably, one of the founders of Yik Yak, Tyler Droll, was a product of Furman Tennis. He also led Furman to 14 Southern Conference Championships, the most in league history, a consistent Top 50 NCAA Div 1 ranking and to the Quarterfinals in both the 1987 NCAA Division I Men's Individual Tennis Championships and the 2002 NCAA Division I Men's Doubles Tennis Championships.

Since 2012, Furman men's tennis team has been coached by former world no. 1 in doubles Kelly Jones. During the 2019–2020 season Furman was ranked in the top 10 in the nation in doubles.

==== Women's tennis ====
Furman women's tennis team has won 19 Southern Conference Championships since 1987, the most in league history, and has been ranked as high as no. 24 in the nation. Since 1999, the women's tennis team has appeared in 12 NCAA Division I Women's Tennis Championships. Furman has had 2 players ranked in the top 10 in the nation in recent years in the individual rankings. During the 2019–2020 season Furman had 2 doubles teams ranked in the top 25 in the nation.

=== Women's lacrosse ===
Started in 2015, the Women's lacrosse team was a member of the ASUN Conference from 2015 to 2017. In their three years as a member, they reached the semifinals of the ASUN Conference Lacrosse Championships 3 times. They became part of the relaunched SoCon women's lacrosse league in 2018, reaching the final of the Southern Conference Lacrosse Championships both in 2018 and 2019. After the SoCon disbanded its women's lacrosse league after the 2021 season, Furman moved that sport to the Big South Conference.

=== Cross country and track and field ===
In the recent years, both Furman's men's and woman's track and field teams have been ranked in the top 15th in the nation in NCAA DI Cross Country National Poll. In 2018, Furman finished 2nd in the 5,000 meters NCAA Women's Outdoor Track and Field Championships event. Furman finished 6th in the 2017 Women's 5,000 meters NCAA Division I Outdoor Track and Field Championships. Furman finished 9th in the 2019 NCAA Division I Cross Country Women's Team Championships and 7th in the 2017 NCAA Division I Cross Country Women's Team Championships. Furman finished 5th in the 2018 NCAA Division I Cross Country Men's Individual Championships.

From 2013 to 2022 the Furman men's and women's cross country team has both won 10 consecutive Southern Conference Championships Furman's Cross Country/Track and Field programs has been under the guidance of former Olympian and former Ohio State head coach Robert Gary since 2012.

Furman hosted the NCAA Southeast Regional Cross Country championships for over a decade, and hosted the 1997 NCAA Cross Country national championship and the 2001 NCAA Cross Country national championship.

=== Rugby ===
Started in 1998, Furman's Rugby Club team won the East Coast Collegiate Division III Championship three years in a row from 2003 to 2005 and was runner-up in 2007 and 2008. In 2011, Furman joined Division II and has appeared in the Division II Rugby Championships final four a record of 8 times in the last 10 years, placing 2nd in 2016 Division II Rugby Championships. Furman ranked no. 6 in the nation in the Division II combined rankings from 2015 to 2019.

Furman built a rugby stadium John S. Roberts Field on campus in 2008, with strong financial backing from alumni and friends. Furman has made a commitment to its rugby program, promising $100,000 annually in scholarships and financial aid to rugby players. Furman rugby is led by head coach John Roberts.

== Nickname ==
The team nickname, the Paladins, was first used by a Greenville, South Carolina, sportswriter in the 1930s. For many years the name "Paladins" just referred to Furman's basketball team. Until 1961 the school's baseball teams were known as the "Hornets" and the football teams as the "Hurricanes". On September 15 of that year, the student body voted to make "Paladins" the official nickname of all of the university's intercollegiate athletic teams.

== Discontinued teams ==
=== Baseball ===
The Furman Paladin baseball team was last led by head coach Brett Harker. The team hosted its games at Latham Baseball Stadium on Furman's campus, but numerous home games were held at Fluor Field in downtown Greenville. The baseball program was terminated by the university on May 18, 2020, due to budget concerns during the COVID-19 pandemic. While active, the baseball team made five appearances in the NCAA Division I Baseball Tournament, most recently in 2005.

=== Men's lacrosse ===
Furman Men's Lacrosse Club team was a member of the Southeast Lacrosse Conference in the Men's Collegiate Lacrosse Association. They added NCAA Division 1 Lacrosse in 2014 and played in the Atlantic Sun Conference for the 2014 season. Starting in 2015, they played in the Southern Conference and reached the semifinals of the conference tournament in 2015, 2017, and 2018. As with varsity baseball, the men's lacrosse program was also discontinued on May 18, 2020, due to budget concerns from the COVID-19 pandemic.
