= Colonial Coast Rugby Conference =

- Sport: Rugby union
- Founded: 2012; 14 years ago
- Divisions: Division III
- Country: USA
- Region: New England
- Website: colonialcoastrugby.com

The Colonial Coast Rugby Conference is a New England–based college rugby conference founded in 2012. The conference provides a pathway to the National Small College Rugby Organization National Championship for Division 3 college rugby programs.

In addition, the conference provides a pathway for women's rugby to compete in the National Collegiate Rugby national championships.

== Membership ==
The following schools are members of the Conference:

- Salve Regina University, Newport, Rhode Island
- Endicott College, Beverly, Massachusetts
- Massachusetts Maritime Academy, Buzzards Bay, Massachusetts
- Wentworth Institute of Technology, Boston, Massachusetts
- Wheaton College, Norton, Massachusetts
- Johnson & Wales University, Providence, Rhode Island
- Plymouth State University, Plymouth, New Hampshire
- Bryant University, Smithfield, Rhode Island
- Roger Williams University, Bristol, Rhode Island
- University of Massachusetts Dartmouth, Dartmouth, Massachusetts
- Bridgewater State University, Bridgewater, Massachusetts
- Franklin Pierce University, Rindge, New Hampshire
- Stonehill College, Easton, Massachusetts

== Championship History ==
- 2022 – Endicott College, Beverly, Massachusetts
- 2021 – Endicott College, Beverly, Massachusetts
- 2020 – Did not play
- 2019 – Salve Regina University, Newport, Rhode Island
- 2018 – Endicott College, Beverly, Massachusetts
- 2017 – Salve Regina University, Newport, Rhode Island
- 2016 – Plymouth State University, Plymouth, New Hampshire
- 2015 – Salve Regina University, Newport, Rhode Island
- 2014 – Roger Williams University, Bristol, Rhode Island
- 2013 – Salve Regina University, Newport, Rhode Island
- 2012 – Salve Regina University, Newport, Rhode Island
