= 2012 NSCRO Men's Division III Rugby Tournament =

The 2012 Men's Division III Rugby Tournament is a tournament which involves approximately 140 schools playing in a single-elimination tournament to determine the national champion of men's NSCRO Division III college rugby as a culmination of the 2011–12 college rugby season. It began in the fall 2011 season in the northeast, midwest and mid-atlantic, and picks up again in the spring 2012 season for the southern teams, and concludes with the final four-style semifinals and championship games on April 29-30, 2012 in Glendale, CO.

The final four are determined by regional tournaments. Salve Regina University of Newport, RI won the largest region - Region 1 (New England & New York) by topping its 46 rugby programs; Franciscan University of Steubenville of Steubenville, OH won Region 3 (Central US) by besting 45 rugby programs.

The finalists from Regions 2 University of North Florida and 4 Cal-Maritime were determined in the spring rugby season. Of some note is the fact that Regions 2 and 4 have just over one-half the rugby programs within Regions 1 and 3. Region 2 appears to have only 24 rugby programs, but there is hope that 10 teams can be added from the remnants of the former USA Rugby South Division 3 college rugby program. Region 4 claims to have 31 rugby programs, however, at least four appear to be large state universities with well developed rugby programs (e.g., University of Nevada, Las Vegas which has 28,000 undergraduates - approximately 26,000 more students than Salve Regina or Franciscan).

This regional participation disparity between conferences is attributable to two things: 1) efforts to place teams within geographical regions according to traditional season (spring vs. fall); and 2) conference re-alignment as encouraged by USA Rugby.

All final four matches are expected to be broadcast live on Livestream.

== Participating Programs ==
=== Region 1 = New England & New York => 42 NSCRO eligible clubs ===
New England North - Maine (4)
Bates
Bowdoin
Colby
UMaine Farmington
New England North - Boston (4)
Babson
Tufts
Worcester Poly
Wentworth
New England South (8)
Central Conn State
Eastern Conn State
Hartford
New Haven U23
Springfield
Trinity
Western Conn State
Western New England
New England Central (6)
Salve Regina
Roger Williams
UMass-Dartmouth
Mass Maritime Academy
Wheaton
Bryant
New England West (6)
Plymouth State
Keene State
Amherst
Williams
Holy Cross
Castleton State
New York State East (4)
Clarkson
Paul Smiths
Potsdam
Rochester Inst. of Tech
Syracuse C (1)
New York State West (4)
Alfred
Brockport C (1)
Canisius
Rochester
St John Fisher
Met New York (6)
Bard
Drew
Molloy
Montclair State
SUNY Maritime
Fairleigh Dickinson
Rutgers C (1)
Stony Brook C (1)

=== Region 2 = SouthAtlantic=> 24 NSCRO eligible clubs ===
Virginia (7)
Christopher Newport
Hampden-Sydney
Lynchburg
Roanoke
Virginia Commonwealth
Washington and Lee
William and Mary
Potomac (4)
American
Frostburg
Montgomery CC
Washington
East Penn East (6)
Delaware C (1)
LaSalle
Lehigh
Rowan
Swarthmore
Ursinus
Widener
East Penn West (7)
Albright
Bucknell
F&M
Gettysburg
Lock Haven
PSU Berks
Susquehanna
Former USARS (10) - Possible Addition
Loyola
Spring Hill
Western Carolina
Eckerd
Florida Gulf Coast
Armstrong Atlantic State
North Florida
Charleston Southern
North Georgia
Georgia College & State

=== Region 3 = Central => 42 NSCRO eligible clubs ===
Minnesota North (5)
Bemidji State
Bethel
Moorhead
Morris
North Dakota
Minnesota Central (5)
Carleton
Macalester
St. Olaf
St. Thomas
Wisconsin-River Falls
Minnesota South (5)
Gustavus
Luther
Southwest State
St. Mary's
Viterbo
Wisconsin (4)
Michigan Tech
Milwaukee School of Engrg
UW Eau Claire
UW Madison C (1)
UW Parkside
Indiana (8)
Anderson
DePauw
Grace
Indiana-Purdue Ft. Wayne
Indiana State 9300 ug
Indiana Wesleyan
Southern Indiana
Wabash
Allegheny North (6)
Allegheny
Clarion
Duquesne
Geneva
Grove City
Penn State-Behrend
Allegheny South (6)
Fairmont State
Franciscan
Juniata
Pittsburgh-Johnstown
Robert Morris
Washington & Jefferson
West Virginia C (1)
Chicago Area (3)
Elmhurst College
Lewis University
University of Chicago

=== Region 4 = PacWest => 31 NSCRO eligible clubs ===
Eastern Rockies (4)
Colorado College
Denver 5400 ug
Regis
Western State
Great Plains (5)
Doane
Nebraska Kearney
South Dakota
South Dakota State
Wayne State
Heart of America (4)
Benedictine
Emporia State
John Brown
Pittsburg State
Texas (6) Lamar
Midwestern State
Southern Methodist
Texas at Dallas 11k
Texas at San Antonio 26k students
Tyler JC
Pacific Northwest (6)
Gonzaga
Oregon Institute of Technology
Puget Sound
Seattle
Whitman
Willamette
Southern California (4)
Cal Lutheran
Concordia
UNLV - 28,000 students?
Westmont
Northern California (7)
California Maritime Academy
Sacramento City College/ Sonoma State University/ San Francisco State/ University Of San Francisco/ University Of Pacific/ Monterey Bay State/ St. Marys C's

== Final 4 ==
Salve Regina 29 vs Franciscan University 20 University of North Florida 26 vs Cal Maritime 31

Third-place game Franciscan 29 vs North Florida 5

Final Game Salve Regina University 22 vs Cal Maritime 15

== Notes ==
This was Salve Regina's first ever National Championship victory in school history.
