= Eastern Pennsylvania Geographical Union =

Eastern Pennsylvania Rugby Football Union Geographical Union
- Abbreviation: EPRU GU
- Formation: 2013
- Headquarters: Philadelphia
- Coordinates: 41.2033°N 77.1945°W
- Region served: Pennsylvania, Delaware, New Jersey; United States
- Official language: English
- President: Bryan Dewease
- Vice president: Jennifer Stratton
- Secretary: Kellie Vetter
- Treasurer: Ray Fritz
- Board of directors: Christine Black, Kings College Women's Rugby Club Dylan Hamilton, Doylestown Rugby Club Emily Pensabene, Northeast Irish Women's Rugby Club Jamie Fortuna, South Jersey Women's Rugby Club Jim Andruskiewicz, Blackthorn Rugby Football Club Lindsay Watson, Brandywine Women's Rugby Club Michael Besio, Northeast Irish Rugby Club (Past President) Scott Stratton, Harrisburg Women's Rugby Football Club Tom Colucci, Delmarva Rugby Football Club
- Affiliations: USA Rugby
- Website: Epru.rugby

The Eastern Pennsylvania Rugby Union is the Geographical Union (GU) for rugby union teams playing in eastern Pennsylvania. It is an association of youth, high school, collegiate, and adult men's and women's rugby teams in eastern Pennsylvania of the United States under USA Rugby.

== See also ==
- Rugby union in the United States
