= Fordham University Rugby Football Club =

US rugby union club, based in Philadelphia, PA

(United States) Fordham Rams
- Full name: Fordham University Rugby Football Club
- Union: USA Rugby
- Nickname: FURFC
- Founded: 1962; 64 years ago
- Region: Empire Geographical Union
- Ground: Murphy Field (Capacity: 200)
- League: Liberty Rugby Conference
1st kit	2nd kit

The Fordham University Rugby Football Club, or FURFC, is a collegiate rugby union team that represents Fordham University. It competes in the Liberty Rugby Conference at a D1A level. Like other Fordham University athletic teams, Fordham ruggers are called the Fordham Rams. With over 100 members, Fordham Rugby is one of the most popular athletic club sports teams at Fordham.

== History ==
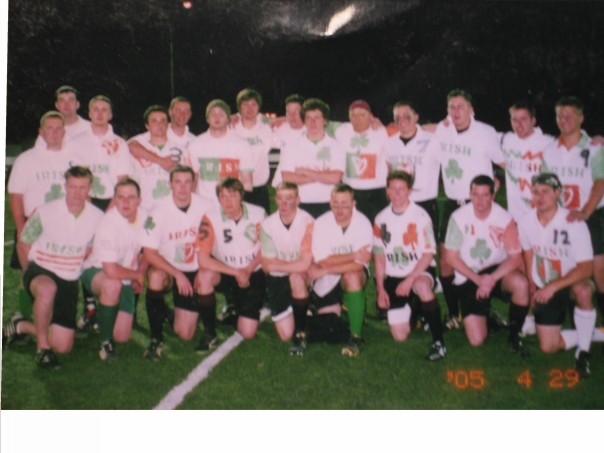
The Fordham "Irish" team pre-kickoff for the 2005 Spring Weekend rugby match

The Fordham University Rugby Football Club celebrated its 50th Anniversary Season in 2012, making it one of the oldest rugby teams in New York City. FURFC's stated mission is to display a commitment through strength of effort embodied in physical perseverance and mental determination. Fordham Rugby embodies the values of collaboration, dedication, and individual responsibility to the whole in all aspects of life. In recent years, an additional emphasis on community service has reinforced the club's commitment to the university's Jesuit ideals. FURFC is often referred to as "The Bronx's Oldest and Toughest Brotherhood". This is exemplified by many FURFC alumni who go on to participate in Fordham's Old Maroon Rugby Football Club which is based out of the Bronx as well. Notable alumni include Ryan McTiernan, Edward Cullen, and Mike Durant(all former USA U-20 Eagles) as well as Tony Reali (host of ESPN's Around the Horn).

=== September 11, 2001 ===
Like the rest of the New York community and American nation, Fordham Rugby was personally struck by the attacks on 9/11. In the collapse of the Twin Towers, six FURFC alumni were killed: Michael Armstrong, Matthew J. Burke, Christopher Robert Clarke, Thomas Anthony Mahon, Christian Maltby, and John McDowell Jr. FURFC maintains a tradition of remembering these six individuals before they take the pitch for every match.

=== Scholarship ===
Michael J. Breslin III died on May 15, 1987, while a senior at Fordham University. He was remembered by his family, friends, and FURFC through the Michael J. Breslin III Scholarship Fund. The fund assists students of Fordham College at Rose Hill and the Gabelli School of Business in the payment of tuition expenses, with preference given to members of the Fordham University Rugby Football Club. The recipients are selected by the deans of Fordham College at Rose Hill and the Gabelli School of Business on the basis of academic achievement and financial need.

== Records and highlights ==
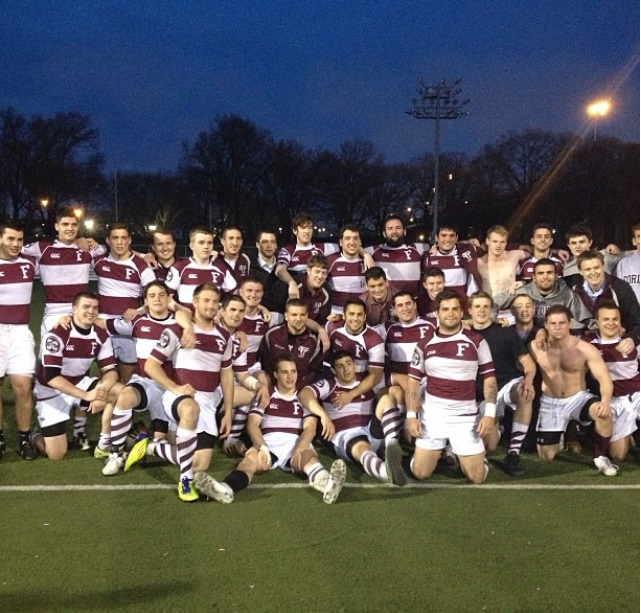
Fordham players celebrating together following a match during the 2013 season

Fordham Rugby has consistently performed well both nationally and regionally, most recently in 2009 when FURFC reached the NRU D1 Playoff Final Four and were crowned Metropolitan New York D1 Champions. In 2009 FURFC also won the storied Cherry Blossoms Tournament. The year prior in 2008, FURFC fell short of the title and finished runner-up in the Metropolitan New York D1 final. In April 2016, Fordham Rugby won the Empire Rugby Conference 7s Championship Series. By winning the Empire Conference, Fordham Rugby's 7s Team qualified to compete for a national title at the USA Rugby College 7s National Championships. The team was also a D1 regional power during the 1990s despite sharing the division with perennial champion Army, who regularly appeared in the national title game during this period. Fordham was Army's toughest division rival during these years and regularly finished near the top of the conference. From 1992 to 1996, Fordham qualified for the national championship playoffs playing Harvard, UConn, Navy, and Buffalo respectively in the national tournament during these years. Fordham was also runner-up in the Metropolitan New York Division in 1992, 1993 and 1994. In 1996, Fordham Rugby finished as champions of the Metropolitan New York Division and was among the final 16 teams representing the east in the national championship tournament and graduated three All-American players.

== Academics and community service ==
Although it competes at the highest intercollegiate level, Fordham Rugby is officially a club sport as determined by the Fordham Athletics Department. Membership is open to any Fordham undergraduate. As such, FURFC membership reflects the diversity of Fordham. The club's emphasis on academic achievement is evident in the high number of student-athletes who are members of the Fordham Honor's College or routinely qualify for the Dean's List. In addition to their many academic accomplishments, the Fordham University Rugby Football Club fulfills regular service commitments to the St. Baldrick's Foundation, The American Red Cross and a host of other organizations and non-profits dedicated to the betterment of the community.

== Facilities ==
FURFC's historic home pitch is Murphy Field situated on Fordham's Historic Rose Hill campus. In addition to Murphy Field, FURFC makes occasional use of Coffey Field, Fordham's football complex.
