= Eastern Pennsylvania Rugby Union =

Eastern Penn Rugby Football Union Geographical Union
- Abbreviation: Eastern Penn GU
- Formation: 2013
- Headquarters: Lafayette College, Easton, Pennsylvania, U.S.
- Region served: Delaware, New Jersey, Pennsylvania; U.S.

The Eastern Pennsylvania Geographical Union (EPGU) is the Geographical Union (GU) for rugby union teams in eastern and central Pennsylvania, and parts of Delaware and New Jersey. EPGU is part of USA Rugby.

== History ==
The Eastern Pennsylvania Rugby Union (EPRU) was the first Local Area Union to hold Level I & Level II Coaching Certification programs. Currently, the EPRU supports 82 full members and 64 high school teams. See Category:Eastern Pennsylvania Rugby Union.

The EPRU became a geographic union in September 2013 and was renamed the Eastern Penn Geographic Union (EPGU).

== College championships ==
- 2004 EPRU Men's Division I Champions: University of Pennsylvania
- 2004 EPRU Women's Division I Champions: Princeton University
- 2004 EPRU Women's Division II Champions: Temple University
- 2005 EPRU Women's Division I Champions: Princeton University
- 2005 EPRU Women's Division II Champions: Kutztown University of Pennsylvania
- 2006 EPRU Men's Division III Champions: Harrisburg RFC
- 2006 EPRU Women's Division I Champions: West Chester University
- 2007 EPRU Men's Division I Champions: Millersville University
- 2007 EPRU Women's Division I Champions: West Chester University
- 2008 EPRU Women's Division I Champions: West Chester University
- 2008 EPRU Men's Division II Champions: St. Joseph's University
- 2008 EPRU Men's Division III Champions: Widener University
- 2009 EPRU Men's Division II Champions: West Chester University
- 2011 EPRU Men's Division III Champions: Rowan University

== See also ==
- Rugby union in the United States
