= SaberCats Stadium =

Rugby-specific ground

- Interactive map of SaberCats Stadium
- Former names: AVEVA Stadium (2019–2022)
- Address: 12131 Kirby Dr; Houston, Texas 77045
- Location: Houston Sports Park
- Coordinates: 29°38′4.2″N 95°23′23.6″W
- Owner: Houston SaberCats
- Operator: Houston SaberCats
- Capacity: 4,000
- Type: Stadium
- Surface: Grass
- Field shape: Rectangular
- Acreage: 41
- Public transit: HCC South Campus Station, METRO Bus

Construction
- Groundbreaking: July 24, 2018
- Built: 2018–2019
- Opened: April 13, 2019
- Cost: Approximately $15.25 million USD
- Architects: Goulas & Associates, Inc.
- Structural engineers: HMSE, Inc.
- General contractor: Christensen Building Group

Tenants
- Houston SaberCats (MLR) (2019–2025); Houston Dynamo 2 (MLSNP) (2022–present); Houston Havoc (UFA) (2023–present)

Website
- houstonsabercats.com

SaberCats Stadium is a rugby union stadium in Houston, Texas, United States, as part of Houston Sports Park and was the home of the Houston SaberCats of Major League Rugby. The groundbreaking ceremony took place on July 24, 2018. Naming rights for the stadium were initially purchased by British information technology company AVEVA, and it was opened as AVEVA Stadium on April 13, 2019. Following the 2022 season, its name officially changed to "SaberCats Stadium".

It is the first stadium in the league built specifically for use by Major League Rugby, and the second rugby-specific stadium primarily for professional competition in the United States.

== History ==
=== Planning and funding ===
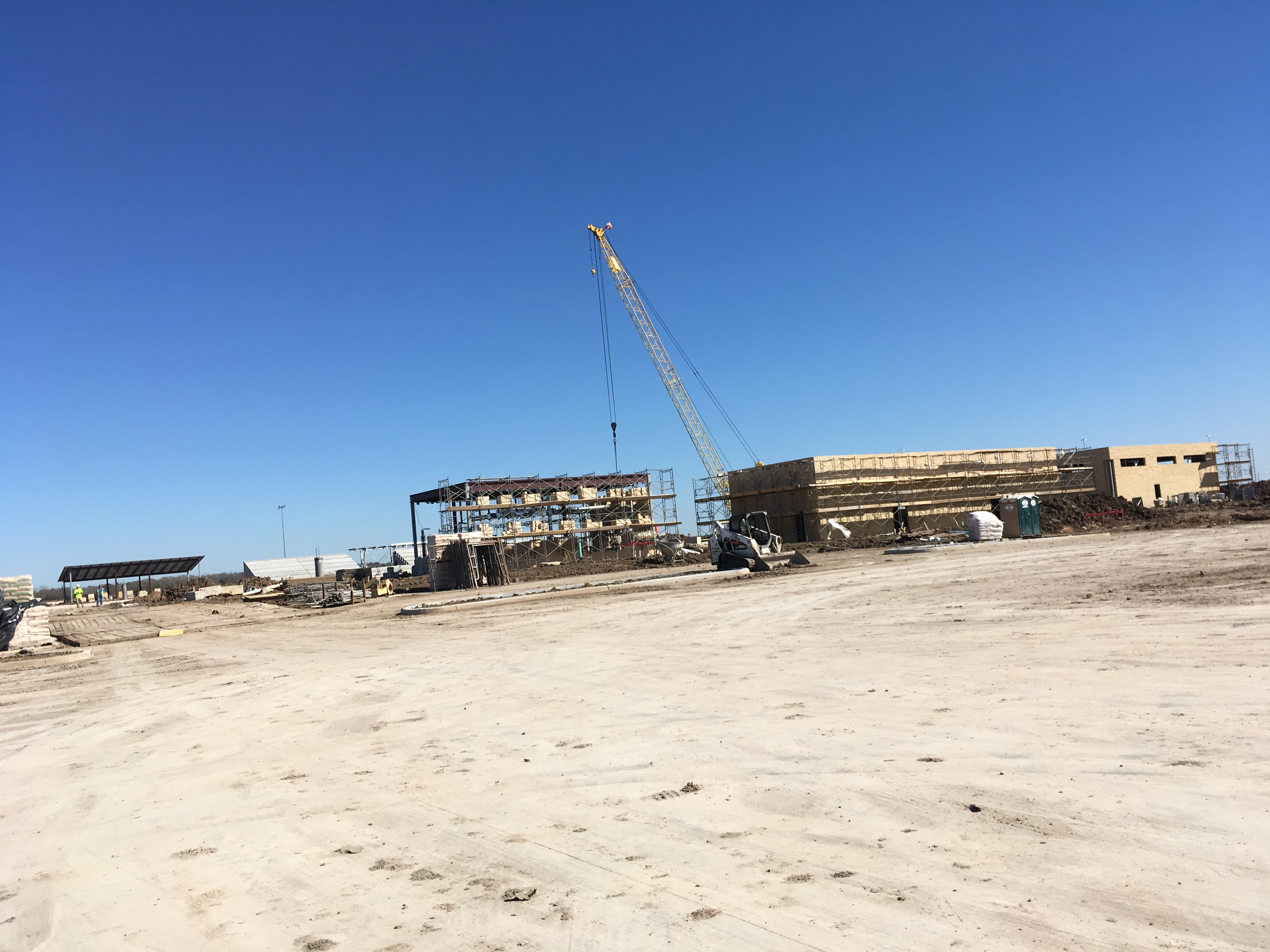
Construction of restrooms and locker rooms with east side stands and pavilion

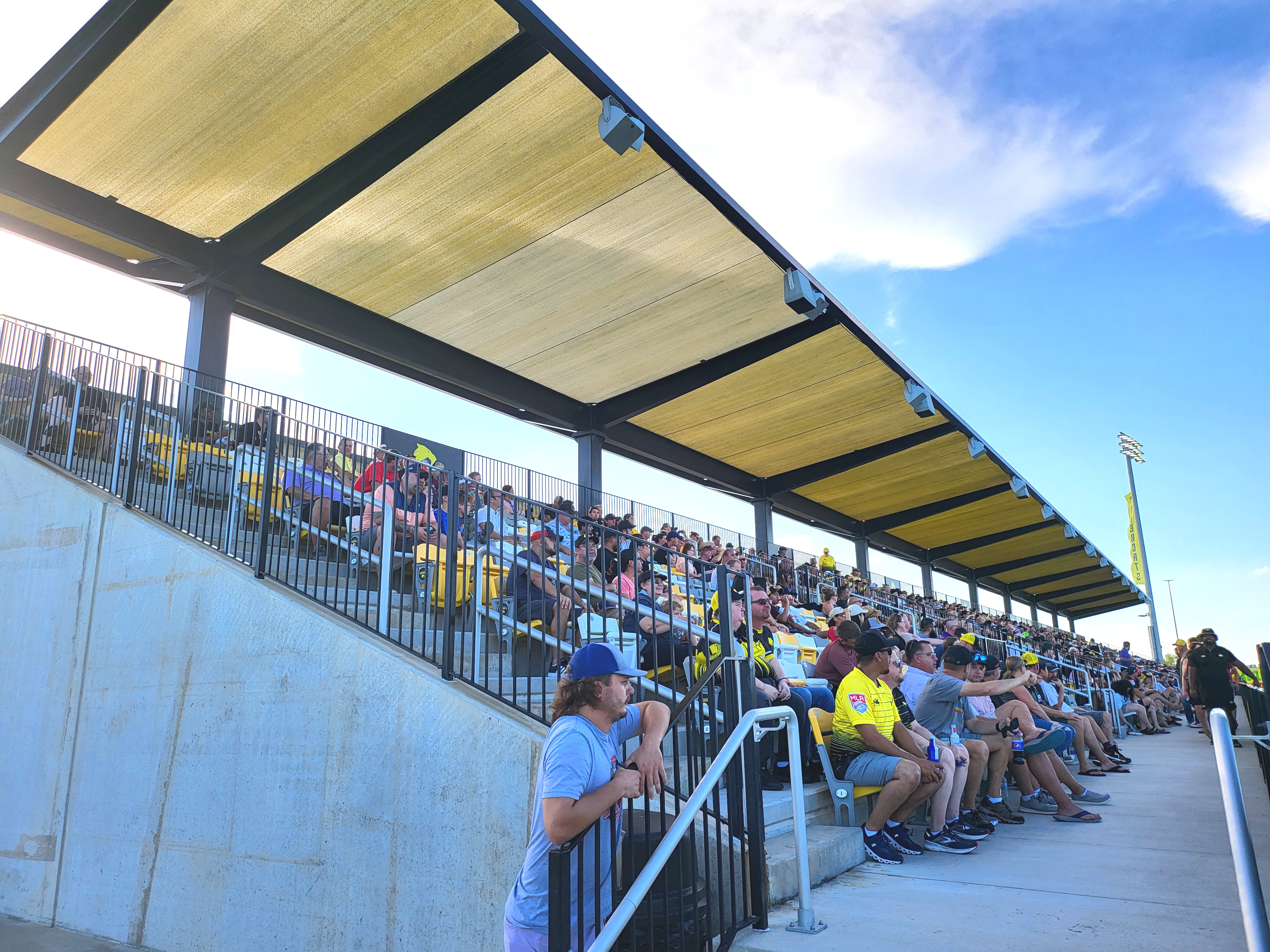
West side stands

In March 2017, local rugby organization and predecessor to the Houston SaberCats, the Houston Strikers publicly announced their plans to build a stadium at the Houston Sports Park located roughly three miles from NRG Park and eight miles from Downtown Houston along the South Freeway. The group also released several other key details such as early renderings, an estimated cost of $10 million, and a 5,000 person initial capacity.

Leading up to the inaugural season of the team, the City of Houston agreed to partially fund a permanent stadium with a contribution of $3.2 million in February 2018. The ownership group expects to invest an additional $12.0 million of their own funds to construct the 3-field, multi-use facility. Details of the deal, outlined in Houston City Ordinance 2018–0085, also confirmed the construction on city-owned property in south Houston at Houston Sports Park, with the city maintaining ownership and leasing stadium grounds back to the team for a 43-year term.

=== Design and construction ===
On July 8, the Houston SaberCats released new preliminary architectural drawings and a groundbreaking announcement for July 24, 2018 via Instagram and then via press release several days later. On July 17, the SaberCats announced naming rights were awarded to AVEVA.

The groundbreaking ceremony took place on July 24, 2018, with the mayor of Houston, Sylvester Turner, representing the city.

=== Opening and current use ===
Construction was still ongoing as the venue opened as "AVEVA Stadium" on April 13, 2019 with a game against the Seattle Seawolves.

After its inauguration, previous games were played before the grand opening, which was postponed and took place on May 29, 2019. The Houston team played against the Glendale Raptors.

Beginning in 2022, Houston Dynamo 2, the reserve side of MLS club Houston Dynamo, began playing home matches at the stadium. As naming rights with AVEVA ended, it became known as "SaberCats Stadium" beginning with the 2022 season.

=== Other events ===
SaberCats Stadium has hosted non-MLR events. In 2022 it hosted both the Division 1-A Rugby final and the United States national rugby union team in a match against the French Barbarians. Also, beginning in 2023 it is the home of the UFA team Houston Havoc, a professional Ultimate Frisbee team. In May, 2026, FIFA announced the facility will be the base camp training facility for the Leopards, the Democratic Republic of the Congo national football team during the FIFA World Cup 2026.

== Facilities ==
SaberCats Stadium's overall facilities include a 1,200-car parking lot and two secondary fields for multipurpose use. While seating capacity exceeds 3,000, the stadium features up to 4,000 maximum capacity by utilizing standing-room-only areas. The venue is primarily the home of the Houston SaberCats professional Rugby team but can accommodate other sports and non-sports events due to the large size of the fields.

The stadium's east and west side stands are grandstands with individual seats. The south side stands feature a mix of bleacher and individual seats, while the north side stands are uncovered bleacher seating. Also located on the south end of the stadium, below the video board, is a full-service bar known as the "Cat's Den" and two berms. Both the bar area and berms allow for general standing.
