= National Collegiate Rugby =

College rugby governing body

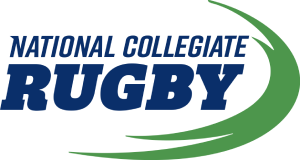
- NCR Logo
- Sport: Rugby union
- Jurisdiction: National
- Abbreviation: NCR
- Founded: 2007; 19 years ago
- Affiliation: USA Rugby
- Headquarters: Wilmington, DE
- President: Rafael Zahralddin
- CEO: Jeremy Treece
- Secretary: Audrey Billingsley

Official website
- www.ncr.rugby
- Other key staff: Wade Smith, COO Brad Dufek, Men's Rugby Director Angela Smarto, Women's Rugby Director Pat Clifton, 7's Commissioner

National Collegiate Rugby (NCR) formerly the "National Small College Rugby Organization" ("NSCRO") is a rugby union governing body in the United States. Headquartered in Wilmington, Delaware, NCR was created in 2007 by Chip Auscavitch and Steve Cohen to support and encourage the development and organization of small college rugby in the country.

In 2020, NSCRO re-branded as "National Collegiate Rugby" as the organization saw massive growth in competition with teams leaving their USA Rugby based leagues for the NCR. As of 2022, NCR competitions include men's and women's championships.

== Championships ==
The NCR runs the following national championship events for both men's and women's college rugby clubs in both 15s and 7s rugby:

National Championship Competitions
Open Division	Small College Division
Men's XVs Grand Cup	Men's 15s Champions Cup
Men's 7s National Championship	Men's 15s Challenge Cup
Women's XVs Cup National Championship (Fall/Spring)	Women's XVs National Championship
Women's 7s National Championship	Men's 7s National Championship
	Women's 7s National Championship

Prior to 2007, the men's Small College XVs national championship (Men's Champions Cup) was known as the East Coast Division III Collegiate Rugby Championships, and Men’s Division III National Championship until 2012.

== History ==
The National Small College Rugby Organization has its beginnings in 2002 to organize the first-ever small college men's and women's college rugby national playoff system, the East Coast D3 Championship. In 2008 was approved by USA Rugby. In August 2012, NSCRO reclassified Division 3 as Small College Rugby, and since 2015 Penn Mutual Life Insurance Company is the main sponsor. Men's Challenge Cup was introduced in 2014 for colleges with developing clubs. In May of 2020, NSCRO was renamed as NCR or National Collegiate Rugby with the goal to serve and work with all collegiate rugby programs of all sizes.

== Conferences ==
Men's Conferences
Small College Division	Open Division
Allegheny Rugby Union	Allegheny Rugby Union
Cardinals Collegiate Rugby Conference	Cardinals Rugby Conference
Chicago Area Rugby Union	Deep South Conference
Colonial Coast Rugby Conference	Gateway Conference
Deep South Rugby Conference	Great Lakes Conference
Dixie Rugby Conference	Great Midwest Conference
Florida Rugby Union	Mid Atlantic Conference
Georgia Rugby Union	Midwest Rugby Conference
Gold Coast Rugby Conference	Northern Lights Rugby Conference
Great Lakes Conference	Southern Rugby Conference (SoCon)
Lonestar Rugby Conference	Tri State Rugby Conference
Mid America Conference	
Mid Atlantic Conference	
Midwest Rugby Conference	
Minnesota Rugby Union	
New England Rugby Conference	
Northern California Conference (NorCal)	
Northwestern Rugby Conference	
Potomac Rugby Conference	
Rocky Mountain Rugby Conference	
Southern Conference (SoCon)	
Three Rivers Conference	
Tri-State Conference	
Upstate Conference	
Wisconsin Rugby Union	

Women's NCR Conferences
Small College Division	Open Division
Allegheny Rugby Union	Allegheny Rugby Union
Carolinas Conference	Great Waters Women's Conference
Capital Rugby Union	Illinois Women's Rugby Conference
Cascades Conference	Midwest Women's Rugby Conference
Colonial Coast Conference	Northern Lights Conference
East Penn Rugby Union	Upstate New York Conference
Great Waters Women's Conference	
Illinois Conference	
Independents	
Northern Lights Conference	
Ohio Valley	
Pacific Desert	
Prairie States	
Rugby Northeast	
Texas Rugby Union	
Tri State Conference	
Upstate New York Conference	
