= Husky Rugby Club =

University of Washington rugby team

University of Washington Rugby Football Club
- Nicknames: Husky Rugby
- Sport: Rugby
- Founded: 1963
- League: USA Rugby
- Conference: Northwest Collegiate Rugby Conference
- Based in: Seattle, Washington
- Arena: IMA Turf Field #1
- Colors: Purple and gold
- Head coach: Will Wheaton
- Website: www.huskyrugby.com

Founded in 1963, the University of Washington Husky Rugby Club plays college rugby in Division 1 in the Northwest Collegiate Rugby Conference against local rivals such as Washington State and Oregon. The Huskies won the Northwest championship in 1996, 2002, 2004 and 2005 and the D1AA Varsity Cup in 2014.

== History of Husky rugby ==
Under the leadership of founding members Dick Jensen, Joe Superfisky, James Decker and others, a newspaper ad was placed in the university paper calling for formation of a university rugby club. Coached by French ex-pat Jacques Cubille, with football jerseys donated by head football coach Jim Owens, the team started the beginning of an over 50-year history.

Founding members: Dick Jensen, Joe Superfisky, and James Decker. The original included the founders and Ev Stitz, Gordon Fouts Hugh Morrison, Pete Rockness, Al Cook, Scott Satterlee, Doug Learman, Jack Huddleston, Graham Bursill, Dick Gadsby, Lori Marlantes, Bruce Winters, Chuck Magsig, and Dave Lush.

== National championships ==
D1AA Varsity Cup Washington 39 Utah Valley University 22

== Decades ==
=== 2000s ===
The Huskies started the decade with a bang winning the PNRFU league championship in 2002, making the Pacific Coast playoffs. In 2003, the Huskies repeated as champions only to lose a heartbreaking match against BYU for entrance to the Sweet 16.
