= Northwest Collegiate Rugby Conference =

- Sports fielded: college rugby
- No. of teams: 7

The Northwest Collegiate Rugby Conference (NCRC) is a college rugby conference in the United States. The conference spans Washington, Idaho, and Oregon.

== Members ==
=== East Division ===
- Boise State
- Eastern Washington
- Gonzaga
- Washington State

=== West Division ===
- Oregon
- Oregon State
- Washington
- Western Oregon
- Western Washington
- Lewis & Clark College
- Reed College
- River Rats Rugby
