= Environmental health officer =

Person responsible for public health

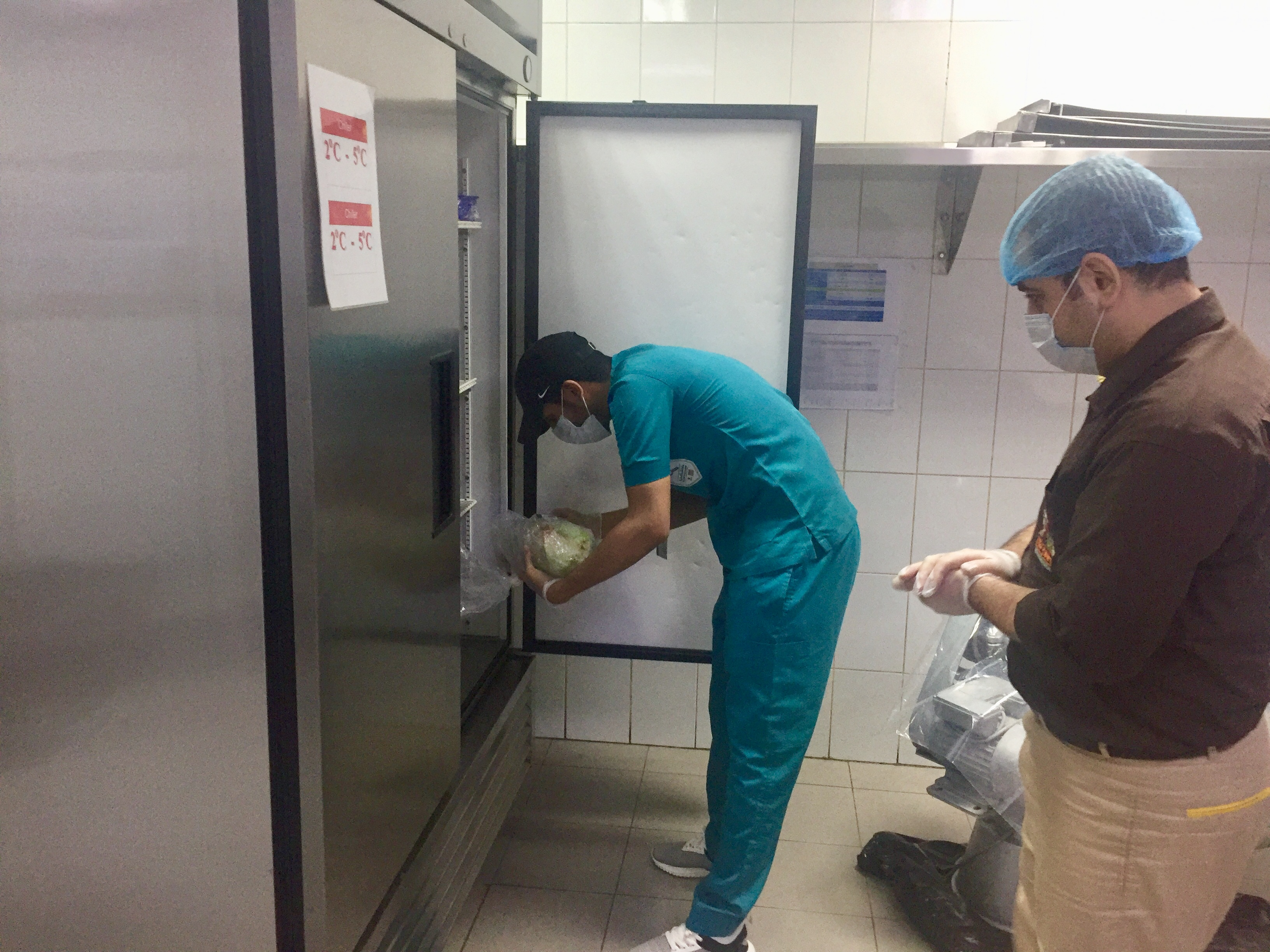
- A health inspector in Saudi Arabia inspecting the contents of a cooler

Occupation
- Synonyms: Environmental health practitioner, public health inspector
- Activity sectors: Environmental health, Public health

Description
- Education required: Varies by country, usually requires a degree and/or certification

An environmental health officer (EHO; also called an environmental health practitioner, EHP, or public health inspector) is a person responsible for carrying out measures to protect public health, which includes the administration and enforcement of legislation related to environmental health and safety hazards.

EHOs aim to keep water, food, air, land, facilities, and other environmental attributes in compliance with local legislation. They control health hazards, including biological, chemical, or physical through the application of environmental safety law. EHOs address factors influencing human behavior outside the workplace. In contrast, workplace factors, such as workplace injury, are addressed by Occupational Safety and Health officers. They also assess and control environmental factors that can potentially affect health to prevent disease and create health-supportive environments.

Environmental determinants of health, such as air, water, and food quality, are significant factors in a community's overall health and well-being. Inspectors play a crucial role in improving population health by reducing the incidence of disease and its consequences.

EHOs are trained to maintain a safe and healthy environment for the public. Employment opportunities in this field may require a degree or additional training and certifications, including public health inspections, policy development, emergency response, disease prevention and control, and health promotion and education. EHOs are responsible for preventing and addressing health risks as well as educating the community about these risks.

EHOs may be familiar with microbiology, epidemiology, chemistry, toxicology, environmental science, and food science. They are skilled in tracking and controlling communicable diseases and investigating environmental health incidents. They must also be familiar with relevant laws and regulations related to public health and safety in their region. As practitioners, they work with government agencies, local municipalities, businesses, and community groups to protect public health. Depending on the specific laws and definitions in their jurisdiction, environmental health practitioners may also go by other titles, including environmental health specialist, public health inspector, and health official. Some historical titles for this role include inspector of nuisances, sanitarian, and sanitary inspector.

Local, state, or federal health departments usually employ environmental health professionals to advise and enforce public health standards. However, many are employed in the private sector, the military, and other third-sector agencies such as charities and nongovernmental organizations.

== Roles and responsibilities ==
Environmental Health Officers are involved in:

- Inspection and enforcement services
- Environmental health consulting and education
- Communicable disease investigations and outbreak control
- Food safety course training
- Community planning
- Sewage disposal systems planning
- Housing standards/quality inspection and control
- Infection prevention and control (IPAC)
- Emergency contingency planning and implementation
- Noise control and air quality monitoring
- Health and safety at work inspection and control
- Water protection and testing
- Environmental sampling, analysis, and results interpretation
- Community care facility licensing
- Quality improvement

== Employment ==
EHOs are employed by local, state, or federal health departments, private sectors, military, and third-sector agencies like charities and NGOs.

- Local Authorities: Enforcing health regulations at local councils.
- Government Agencies: Working in agencies like CDC's NCEH or EPA.
- Public Health Organizations: Ensuring compliance with health and safety standards.
- Private Consulting Firms: Specializing in environmental health and safety services.
- Private Sector and Healthcare: Roles in public health, healthcare, occupational safety, and more.
- Occupational Health and Safety: Ensuring worker safety in both public and private sectors.
- Environmental Protection and Sustainability: Addressing issues related to climate change and sustainability.

An EHO investigates health hazards in many settings and will take action to mitigate or eliminate hazards. Depending on the jurisdiction, EHOs may have broad job duties, including inspecting swimming pools, substandard housing conditions, shelters, public schools, daycares, nursing homes, conveyances (e.g., cruise ships, ferries, airplanes, trains), and personal service establishments (e.g., tattoo parlors, tanning salons, beauty salons, laser hair removal facilities, barbershops).

EHOs may also permit and inspect wells, private water systems, and individual subsurface sewage disposal (septic) systems. Other tasks include campground inspections, special events inspections, waste management inspections, petting zoo inspections, correctional facility inspections, mobile home park inspections, and homeless encampment inspections.

Some EHOs are trained in communicable disease control and prevention. During a disease outbreak they may investigate and recommend/apply interventions to stop the spread of disease. They may also be trained in noncommunicable disease (NCD) prevention and control. They can work to prevent NCDs and control risk factors. EHOs also may play a vital role in community projects such as those concerning health promotion, health equity, tobacco use reduction, healthy built environments/healthy communities, food security, and emergency preparedness.

They may also respond to complaints such as animal bites (rabies control), garbage complaints, noise complaints, odour complaints, or sewage overflows. Depending on their educational background and training, they can provide information and referrals concerning lead, radon, mould, and emerging diseases (e.g., West Nile virus, avian influenza, COVID-19). The field also overlaps with hazardous materials (hazmat), and many hazmat responders are licensed environmental health practitioners or registered environmental health specialists.

During a public health emergency, such as a pandemic, they may take on crucial emergency response roles, provide public education and advice, enforce public health orders, and take necessary actions to protect public health. Likewise, they respond to other emergencies such as natural disasters by undertaking roles outlined in emergency response plans.

== Related roles ==
Related roles include environmental health scientists, policymakers, safety inspectors, and others.

The common identifier of environmental health personnel is that they are responsible for the identification, evaluation, and management of risks to human health from factors in the environment, whether on behalf of government agencies or private sector organizations.

== Working conditions ==
Environmental Health Officers (EHOs), also known as Public Health Inspectors, have working conditions characterized by a variety of factors:

- Work environment: EHOs typically operate in diverse settings, including government agencies, private companies, and non-profit organizations. Their role often entails visiting various locations, such as restaurants, public facilities, and industrial sites, to ensure adherence to health and safety regulations.
- Schedule: The work schedule of EHOs can be variable. While some may adhere to regular business hours, others might work evenings, weekends, or be on-call for responding to public health emergencies.
- Physical demands: The job can be physically demanding, requiring EHOs to spend long periods on their feet and sometimes work under challenging conditions. Handling and testing samples is also part of their duties, necessitating manual dexterity and strict adherence to safety protocols.
- Mental and emotional demands: EHOs face the challenge of keeping up-to-date with complex regulatory frameworks and public health guidelines. Dealing with non-compliant operators or handling public health emergencies can add to the stress levels.
- Travel: Frequent travel within their jurisdiction is common for EHOs, and they may occasionally need to travel farther for training or conferences.
- Safety risks: EHOs are sometimes exposed to health and safety hazards, including hazardous materials, contaminated environments, or infectious diseases. This necessitates the use of protective equipment and strict safety procedures.
- Training and continuous learning: A degree in environmental health or a related field is typically required, along with ongoing professional development to stay current with regulations and best practices.
- Interpersonal interactions: The role involves significant interaction with the public, business operators, and other stakeholders, necessitating strong communication and sometimes negotiation skills.
- Job satisfaction: Many EHOs find their role satisfying, as it significantly contributes to public health and safety.
- Career advancement: Advancement opportunities may include specialized roles, supervisory positions, or movement into related fields like policy development or environmental consulting.

== History ==
The role of environmental health officers (EHOs) has evolved significantly over the centuries, beginning as early as the Renaissance in the Republic of Venice, where a type of court of health inspectors was established to contain the spread of epidemics. These inspectors, appointed by the Venetian Senate and later by the Council of Ten, were among the earliest forms of organized public health efforts.

During the early Industrial Revolution, particularly under the Factory Act 1802, local magistrates in England appointed two sanitary inspectors to oversee factory sanitation. These early inspectors, including a former cleric and a justice of the peace, played a crucial role in addressing the health and sanitation issues arising from industrialization.

The field of environmental health as we know it today can be traced back to the 1840s in England. Edwin Chadwick, a Poor Law Commissioner, conducted an inquiry into poverty's causes, highlighting the link between poor health and bad environmental conditions. Chadwick's campaign for improved sanitation led to the Public Health Act 1848 (11 & 12 Vict. c. 63), establishing a General Board of Health and allowing local boards to correct discovered issues based on an inspector's survey.

In 1883, the Association of Public Sanitary Inspectors, which later became the United Kingdom's Chartered Institute of Environmental Health, was established. This marked a significant development in the professionalization of the field. Over the following decades, the role and qualifications of environmental health practitioners evolved, transforming into a graduate profession by the 1960s. The profession's enhanced role and status were further recognized with the grant of a royal charter in 1984.

Reflecting the changes in their roles and educational requirements, the titles of these professionals have evolved over the years, from inspectors of nuisances to sanitary inspectors, and then to public health inspectors or environmental health officers. This progression also mirrors International Trends, as the titles and roles of environmental health officers have adapted to reflect their advanced education and expanding responsibilities.

Throughout history, Environmental Health Officers have been integral to public health, adapting their roles and expertise to meet the challenges of their times, from the spread of epidemics in Renaissance Venice to the complex public health needs of modern societies.

=== Inspector of nuisances ===
"Inspector of Nuisances" was a title given to officials in various English-speaking jurisdictions, primarily associated with public health and sanitation from the mid-19th century onwards. While now considered archaic in many places, its historical significance remains notable.

The first Inspector of Nuisances appointed by a UK local authority health committee was Thomas Fresh in Liverpool in 1844. The role was formalized with the passage of the Nuisances Removal and Diseases Prevention Act 1855 and the Metropolis Management Act 1855, under the title 'Sanitary Inspector'. In jurisdictions with established boards of health, the title was 'Inspector of Nuisances'. Eventually, 'Sanitary Inspector' became the standardized title across all UK local authorities. In 1900 the Australian National Council of Women was drawing attention of the authorities to the success of women as sanitary inspectors in England appointed by Thomas Orme Dudfield.

The job title in Britain was changed to 'Public Health Inspector' by an Act of Parliament in 1956. Similar offices had been established throughout the British Empire.

In the modern context, the nearest equivalent in the UK is the 'Environmental Health Officer', a title adopted following the Local Government Act 1972, on the recommendation of the Central Government.

In the United States, an example of the continued use of the title 'Inspector of Nuisances', albeit with a different scope, is found in Section 3767 of the Ohio Revised Code. This defines the role as investigating nuisances broadly covering establishments associated with lewdness and alcohol. The environmental health role in US local authorities is typically undertaken by officers titled 'Registered Environmental Health Specialist' or 'Registered Sanitarian', depending on the jurisdiction. Within the US Public Health Service, these functions are carried out by commissioned (uniformed) 'Environmental Health Officers'.

== Qualifications ==
Environmental health is a graduate career in most countries. The minimum requirements in most countries include an approved university degree program, field training, and professional certification and registration.

=== Australia ===
Environmental Health Australia (EHA) accredits Australian Environmental Health Degree and Graduate Diploma programs in accordance with the Environmental Health Australia Accreditation Policy to ensure course content meets nationally consistent requirements for practice as an EHO anywhere in Australia. As of 1 July 2009, there are EHA-accredited universities in every state and the Northern Territory.

==== Victoria ====
The current requirements to become an authorised officer under the Food Act 1984 in Victoria are defined by the Secretary of the Department of Health and Human Services. A range of undergraduate and graduate qualifications from Victoria, interstate and overseas are acceptable.

==== Western Australia ====
The Health Act 1911 (as amended) defines the role of 'environmental health officer' and empowers the Executive Director, Public Health to appoint EHOs to local government health authorities and as public health officials employed by state government. The Executive Director, of Public Health is advised by the Western Australian Environmental Health Officers Professional Review Board on graduate and postgraduate qualifications that are deemed suitable to allow environmental health practice in Western Australia, and the qualifications are published from time to time in the Government Gazette.

Currently, Curtin University and Edith Cowan University offer environmental health degrees in Western Australia which are also accredited by EHA.

=== Canada ===
EHOs must hold at least a bachelor's degree in environmental health and a national professional certificate—the Certificate in Public Health Inspection (Canada) (CPHI(C)).

Certification and registration are regulated by the Canadian Institute of Public Health Inspectors (CIPHI). To become nationally certified, public health inspectors must complete an approved degree program, complete a field training practicum, and pass the Institute's Board of Certification examination (consisting of written reports and an oral examination). To maintain the CPHI(C) credential, practitioners must be registered with CIPHI and submit professional development hours annually.

Only six schools in Canada offer degree programs approved by CIPHI as meeting the educational requirement for certification: British Columbia Institute of Technology, Cape Breton University, Concordia University of Edmonton, Conestoga College, Toronto Metropolitan University, and Université de Montréal. These programs are generally four years long; however, fast-track programs are available in some schools for those who have a previous science degree.

=== New Zealand ===
In New Zealand, Entrants to the profession must have either a BAppSc Health Protection or BHSc Environmental Health. Alternatively, suitably qualified science graduates can obtain a graduate diploma in environmental health.

=== Ireland ===
To become an EHO in Ireland, it is necessary to hold an environmental health degree approved by the Department of Health. The study of environmental health in Ireland also requires students to undertake a period of professional practice with the Health Service Executive. Following the period of professional practice, competence must then be demonstrated through an experiential learning logbook and oral examination.

=== Sri Lanka ===
To become a Public Health Inspector (PHI) in Sri Lanka, applicants are required to be male, to be over 5' 2" tall, and must have passed 2 subjects from Chemistry, Physics, Agriculture, Combined mathematics, Biology with a Credit Pass for Biology or Combined Mathematics in one sitting at the G.C.E. A/L Examination. Trainee PHIs must undergo training for 2 years at the School of Public Health Inspectors at the National Institute of Health Sciences.

=== United Kingdom ===
EHOs hold at least an undergraduate (or postgraduate) qualification recognized by the Chartered Institute of Environmental Health. Similar provisions exist in Scotland, where the profession is regulated by The Royal Environmental Health Institute of Scotland (REHIS).

Following the educational requirements and practical training period, competence must then be demonstrated through an experiential learning logbook and oral examination before registration is granted.

=== United States ===
Environmental health specialists must usually have a bachelor's degree in environmental health or related area, but many hold master's or doctoral degrees in environmental or occupation health. Degrees generally must be accredited by the Council on Education for Public Health (CEPH).(USPHS) A registry of environmental health specialists (also known as a registry of sanitarians) is maintained by local jurisdiction, such as a state, as well as by the National Environmental Health Association.(NEHA) Advanced practitioners may pursue additional recognition as Diplomates of the American Academy of Sanitarians.

== See also ==
- Chief Green Officer (CGE)
- Canadian Institute of Public Health Inspectors
- Public health
- Environmental health
- Occupational Safety and Health
