= Chicago Area Rugby Football Union =

US Local Area Union for rugby union teams

- Sport: Rugby union
- Founded: 1974
- President: Lou Raymond
- Men's coach: TBA
- Women's coach: TBA
- Website: carfurugby.org

The Chicago Area Rugby Football Union (CARFU) is the Local Area Union (LAU) for rugby union teams in the Chicago metropolitan area. CARFU is part of the Midwest Rugby Football Union (MRFU), which is also the governing body for the Allegheny, Illinois, Indiana, Iowa, Michigan, Minnesota, Ohio, and Wisconsin LAU's. All local and territorial unions are part of USA Rugby.

== Men's ==
=== Division I ===
- Chicago Griffins (affiliated with Chicago Rugby Club)
- Chicago Lions
- Chicago Blaze (Lemont, IL)

=== Division II ===
- Lincoln Park (Chicago)
- Southside Irish (Chicago)
- Chicago Riot (Chicago)
- Fox Valley Maori (St. Charles, IL)
- Chicago Westside Condors (affiliated with Chicago Rugby Club)
- Chicago Lions (D2)
- Lake County Coyotes (Gurnee, IL)

=== Division III ===
- Chicago Blaze (D3)
- Northwest Indiana Exiles (Hobart, IN)
- Northwest Woodsmen (Schaumburg, IL)
- Rockford Ravens
- Peoria Pigs (Peoria, IL)
- Chicago Silverbacks (affiliated with Chicago Rugby Club)

=== Division IV ===
- Kenosha Mammoths
- Chicago Dragons
- Lincoln Park (D4)
- South Side Irish (D4)
- Chicago Riot (D4)
- Fox Valley Maori (D4)
- Lake County Coyotes (D4)

== Women's ==
=== Division I ===
- Chicago Women's
- Chicago North Shore Women's RFC
- Chicago Lions

=== Division II ===
- Chicago Sirens
- County Will Morrigans

== Collegiate ==
CARFU features teams from eight schools: Chicago, DePaul, Illinois-Chicago, Lake Forest, Loyola, Northern Illinois, Northwestern, Lewis, and Elmhurst. As of 2008, Notre Dame switched to Division I status, the only CARFU collegiate club competing at that level at the time, later joined by the University of Illinois at Urbana-Champaign. Lake Forest only plays in the spring and does not compete for the CARFU Cup in the fall. The University of Chicago is one of the oldest clubs in the US, having been formed in 1933. Lewis University and Elmhurst are the newest members of CARFU, with Elmhurst beginning play in fall 2010. Loyola, Northern Illinois, UIC, the University of Chicago and Lake Forest compete at the Division II level. Elmhurst, Lewis, and DePaul are Division III.

=== Men's ===
- 2006 CARFU Champion, Loyola, lost to Wisconsin–Milwaukee 49–0 in the first round of the Midwest Division II Playoffs, and then subsequently lost to Iowa St. 8–3.
- The 2007 CARFU Champion was Northwestern University, winning it for the first time since 1999. They went 5–0 in conference play and 5-1 overall.
- The 2008 CARFU Champion was Loyola (4-1), although Northern Illinois University (5-0) beat them earlier in the season. Northern Illinois was disqualified because some of their players were not CIPPed in time for the first game of the season. Loyola went on to the Midwest Rugby Union playoffs. Loyola and Northwestern have won the last six CARFU titles (Loyola-4, Northwestern-2).
- 2010 CARFU champion, Northern Illinois University, with a 7–1 season.
- 2011 CARFU champion, Northern Illinois University
- 2012 CARFU champion, Northern Illinois University
- 2013 CARFU champion, Northern Illinois University
