= Chief sustainability officer =

Corporate business position

The chief sustainability officer, sometimes known by other titles, is the corporate title of an executive position within a corporation that is in charge of the corporation's "environmental" programs. Several companies have created such environmental manager positions in the 21st century to formalize their commitment to the environment. The rise of the investor ESG (Environment, Social and Governance) movement and stakeholder capitalism, has increased the need for corporations to address sustainability and social issues across their value chain, and address growing needs of external stakeholders. Normally these responsibilities rest with the facility manager, who has provided cost effective resource and environmental control as part of the basic services necessary for the company to function. However, as sustainability initiatives have expanded beyond the facility — so has the importance of the position to what is now a C-level executive role. The position of CSO has not been standardized across industries and individual companies which leads it to take on differing roles depending on the organization. The position has also been challenged as symbolic, in that it does not actually have the effect of increasing sustainable practices.

As of 2018, 44 CSOs were identified at largest companies in the world, with most having the rank of vice president or higher, and according to the Weinreb Group 45% of CSOs are women and 55% men as of 2018. In September 2026, 53 of the 483 Fortune 500 companies covered by a ProfessionLens census listed a chief sustainability officer, and none of the 4,469 Inc. 5000 companies covered did. A 2011 study found that the majority of top corporate sustainability executives are two degrees removed from their CEO in the corporate hierarchy, meaning that their boss reports to the CEO.

== Responsibilities ==
Chief sustainability officers are responsible for an organization's objectives and initiatives relating to sustainability. Sustainability is defined by the United Nations as "development that meets the needs of the present without compromising the ability of future generations to meet their own needs."

The intent of the CSO position, as a member of the c-suite, is to address sustainability issues across a firm and stress the significance of sustainability to other top executives. The c-suite is a collection of the highest level executives of a firm, including but not limited to the chief executive officer (CEO), chief marketing officer (CMO), chief financial officer (CFO), and chief information officer (CIO). The position of CSO is a strategic position that concentrates on communicating risks and opportunities related to sustainability as well as bottom line impact. In struggling companies, the appointment of a CSO is shown to increase revenue growth. In addition to setting sustainability strategy, the CSO monitors current initiatives.

CSO's are also often responsible for:

- Communicating work done on sustainability both inside and outside the organization;
- Managing certifications such as Fair Trade Certified Mark, Organic certification and B Corporation (certification);
- Establishing internal process for calculating organizational Carbon footprint and building plans for reducing it;
- Waste Management, recycling and supply-chain management and building a plan towards supporting a Circular economy
- Evaluating the environmental footprint of their Information and communications technology including their corporate websites.
- Working with procurement to reduce Scope 3 emissions.

== Decision making ==
The CSO position is used to inform long-term decision making. In Europe, the position is a forward-thinking one that interacts mostly with the big picture by incorporating and monitoring mid- to long-term sustainable objectives. In Scandinavia, companies are more likely than American companies to have a position dedicated to sustainability in their senior management. The top three firms on Corporate Knights' The Global 100 index of the world's most sustainable corporations–Ørsted A/S, Chr. Hansen Holding A/S, and Neste Oyj–are all Scandinavian.

== Challenges ==
=== Standardization ===
The utility of the position of CSO has been questioned. Across industries and companies, there is no widely used standard and therefore the impact of a CSO can differ from company to company. Larger companies are more likely to be able to take advantage of economies of scale to implement economical sustainability changes.

=== Symbolic nature ===
The position of CSO has been attacked as being symbolic and not making a concrete difference in organizations that employ the position. Studies have shown a correlation between pollution and the presence of a CSO in companies in high pollution industries, directly contradicting the stated purpose of a CSO. When an organization has outside pressures such as regulation, it is much more likely to engage in a higher degree of sustainable behavior. It has also been shown that often in large companies a CSO has a larger impact on decreasing environment-related corporate social irresponsibility (CSiR) than it does on increasing corporate social responsibility (CSR).

== Universities ==
Some universities in the US have appointed Chief Sustainability Officers or Sustainability Directors. The Pennsylvania State University was the first to appoint a CSO responsible for integrating sustainability in curriculum, research, operations, student engagement and community outreach.

== Related positions ==
The nomenclature of the position of CSO is not standardized across companies. A common name for a similar position is Chief Officer of Corporate Social Responsibility. This position may sometimes have a slightly wider range of responsibilities as they are responsible for everything CSR related, not just the aspects of CSR relating to sustainability. Other common titles are Executive Vice President of Sustainability, Senior Vice President of Sustainability, or Vice President of Sustainability. These all refer to positions concerned with sustainability, but are not at the c-suite level.

Some alternate titles referring to the person in charge of sustainability are:

- Director of Sustainability
- Environmental policy manager
- Director of environment, energy, & safety
- Director of social & environmental responsibility
- Chief officer of environment
- Social & environmental sustainability manager
- Chief of environmental health and safety
- Certified sustainability administrator

== See also ==
- Chief green officer (CGO)
- Corporate social responsibility (CSR)
- Employee engagement
- Micro-sustainability
- Sustainability
- Environmental Manager
