= Indiana High School Rugby =

Indiana has become one of the premiere states for high school rugby, with the boys' top league, the Super League, crowned the 2014 toughest high school league. Indiana teams have claimed multiple national and regional championships. At the start of the 2016 season, there were approximately fifty boys teams and fifteen girls teams competing in Indiana. The fifty boys teams were organized into four programs in the Super League, eight in Division 1, twelve in Division 2, and one developmental side. In addition to varsity competition, many programs also contest in junior varsity and developmental competitions, allowing programs to put forth multiple teams.

== Governance ==
Unlike most high school sports in Indiana, governed by the Indiana High School Athletic Association, rugby in Indiana is governed by the Indiana Youth Rugby Foundation, Inc., which was formed in 1999 to replace the Indiana Youth Rugby Association, Inc. (1990–1999). The foundation operates under the brand Rugby Indiana and is a 501(c)(3) charitable non-profit corporation that operates outside the governing structure of the Indiana Rugby Football Union. Rugby Indiana's stated vision is:

- To make rugby a legitimate high school sport opportunity for all athletes by providing a great experience on and off the field, and by gaining recognition in High School, Middle School, and Grade School administrations
- Stimulate the quality, growth and development of Rugby at the High School and Youth level
- To raise awareness of, and educate the general public about the sport of Rugby

Top performing teams may also compete in a regional competition governed by the Midwest Rugby Football Union and a national invitational competition. These competitions, unlike Indiana state-level competition, make a distinction between whether teams are composed of players drawn from a single school or a club program open to multiple student bodies.

== Play and participation ==
As Allyn Freeman explained in an article for RugbyToday.com, "America's high schools represented the last place of expansion" for domestic rugby. Although slow to catch on, rugby at the high school level has exploded in growth since the close of the twentieth century. From 2008 to 2013, rugby participation grew by 81% in the United States, while participation in American football fell 21.1% in the same span. In 2014, participation reached 1.2 million, making rugby the fastest growing sport in the United States. As of 2011, Indiana Rugby boasted 1,227 players at the high school level (902 boys, 325 girls).

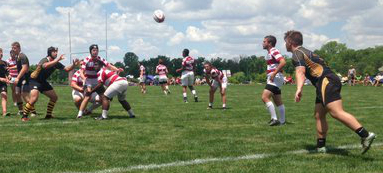
Lineout during Fishers v. Avon, 2016 D1 Varsity Boys Final

Unlike senior level clubs, which play two forty-minute halves, youth rugby in the United States is capped below the traditional eighty-minute match. In Indiana, matches are scheduled for two thirty-minute halves, with players not allowed to participate in more than ninety minutes of scheduled match time in a single day. In competitions in which teams compete in multiple matches, the total length of the match is truncated to comport with the ninety-minute daily cap, thus, the matches are contested at two halves each of 22.5 minutes in duration. Matches consist of fifteen players on the field for each team along with eight reserves on the bench (23 total). Matches will end in a draw if level at the end of full-time unless in a championship competition. In a championship competition, if the match is level at full-time, an additional ten-minute sudden death period is played. If the match remains level after sudden death, then the outcome is decided on drop kicks. If multiple matches are to be contested in a single day, the sudden death period is foregone. Coed play at the high school level is not permitted. The coed prohibition was tested in May 2001 by the Mishawaka High School boys squads' attempt to include Nicole Kodba in its playoff lineup. Despite arguments from her coach and a community petition, Kodba was not allowed to compete for the boys team. The ruling was controversial and drew critics from among the rugby coaching ranks.

Rugby Indiana's season is broken into three different phases: a competitive season from March through June, a select side season (akin to all-star teams) from June through July, and a fall sevens season from September through October. Based upon team participation, competition is held across a divisional and conference structure. At the top of the boys' competition is the Super League, comprising four teams. The next tier is Division 1 which divides eight teams among a north and south conference. In addition to the typical varsity competition, both Division 1 and the Super League hold a junior varsity competition that competes for a state championship. Below Division 1 is Division 2, which presently includes twelve teams split into north and south conferences. At times, Rugby Indiana has also conducted a developmental league to aid new programs. When participation is sufficient, the girls competition is broken into two divisions. In 2016, only a single division was used for girls rugby spread across north and south conferences of unequal numbers.

In order for players to compete, they must be registered both with Rugby Indiana and USA Rugby. Players must also not have reached nineteen years of age prior to September 1. Girls in the 8th grade who are at least 14 years of age may, at the head coach's discretion, compete on a high school team. Players must be enrolled in high school, enrolled in a GED program, or meet the standards of Indiana home school requirements. Players are also required to attend at least four practices with coached supervised tackling prior to participation in a sanctioned match. Players are also required to hold amateur status.

== Boys Championships ==
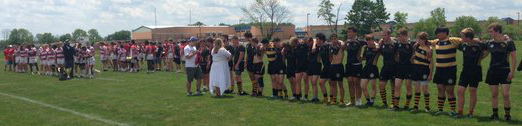
2016 D1 Varsity Boys Award Presentation

=== Super League ===
In 2014, four perennial powerhouse teams formed a new top tier, supplanting Division 1 as the highest tier. The original four teams forming the Super League were Brownsburg, the Royal Irish Rugby Club based out Cathedral and Bishop Chatard, Notre Dame de La Salette of Georgetown, Illinois, and Penn. Each team has reached tremendous heights on the national stage: the Royal Irish have claimed four national titles (2012, 2014, 2015, 2017), Brownsburg claimed the 2005 Tier II national championship, and both Penn and La Salette have reached the national finals. After the 2014 season, this prolonged success led Goff Rugby Report to declare the Indiana Super League the toughest high school league in the United States. In 2017, Notre Dame de La Salette began to compete in Illinois, leaving the four-team super league structure missing a fourth team. The Super League was expanded to nine teams split into two divisions. In the North Division were Bishop Dwenger, Carroll, Culver, and Penn. In the South Division were Brownsburg, Fishers, Hamilton Southeast, Royal Irish, and St. Xavier. At seasons end, Royal Irish, fresh off a national championship, would edge Penn for the Super League title. The restructured competition also introduced the Challenge Cup as a consolation competition at the state playoffs. In 2019, the Super League contracted to seven teams with St. Xavier and Hamilton Southeastern dropping to Division 1. Following the 2022 season, the Super League folded back into Division 1 and the prior Division 1 was renamed Division 2.

==== Varsity State Champion ====
Season	Date	Winner	Score	Loser	Site	Semifinalists	MVP	Sources
2014	May 31, 2014	Royal Irish	5–3	Penn	Moose Rugby Grounds; Elkhart, IN	Brownsburg; Notre Dame de La Salette	Noah Schrader; Royal Irish	
2015	May 30, 2015	Penn	33–14	Royal Irish	Moose Rugby Grounds; Elkhart, IN	Brownsburg; Notre Dame de La Salette	Inoke Moala; Penn	
2016	May 30, 2016	Royal Irish (2)	23–19	Penn	Cyntheanne Park; Fishers, IN	Brownsburg; Notre Dame de La Salette	David Hannon, Royal Irish; Will Vakalahi, Penn	
2017	May 29, 2017	Royal Irish (3)	19–15	Penn	Moose Rugby Grounds; Elkhart, IN	Fishers; Carroll	Gabe Coleman; Royal Irish	
2018	May 28, 2018	Royal Irish (4)	17–12	Fishers	Cyntheanne Park; Fishers, IN	Penn; Culver	Andy Guhl Royal Irish	
2019	May 27, 2019	Royal Irish (5)	20–12	Penn	Moose Rugby Grounds; Elkhart, IN	Brownsburg; Fishers	Russell Lemaster Royal Irish	
2020	N/A	Cancelled						
2021	May 31, 2021	Royal Irish (6)	32-21	Bishop Dwenger	Moose Rugby Grounds Elkhart, IN	Brownsburg HSE		
2022	May 30, 2022	Royal Irish (7)	20-17	HSE	Moose Rugby Grounds Elkhart, IN	Penn Bishop Dwenger		

==== Varsity Challenge Cup Champion ====
Season	Date	Winner	Score	Loser	Site	Semifinalists	MVP	Sources
2017	May 29, 2017	Culver	31–12	St. Xavier	Moose Rugby Grounds; Elkhart, IN	Bishop Dwenger; Hamilton Southeast		
2018	May 28, 2018	Carroll	28–23	Bishop Dwenger	Cyntheanne Park; Fishers, IN	Brownsburg		

==== Junior Varsity State Champion ====
Season	Date	Winner	Score	Loser	Site	Semifinalists	MVP	Sources
2014	May 31, 2014	Notre Dame de La Salette (JV)	29–17	Penn (JV)	Moose Rugby Grounds; Elkhart, IN	Brownsburg (JV); Royal Irish (JV)		
2015	May 30, 2015	Penn (JV)	19–17	Royal Irish (JV)	Moose Rugby Grounds; Elkhart, IN	Brownsburg (JV); Notre Dame de La Salette (JV)		
2016	May 30, 2016	Royal Irish (JV)	29–22	Penn (JV)	Cyntheanne Park; Fishers, IN	Brownsburg (JV); Notre Dame de La Salette (JV)	Stuart Earnhardt; Royal Irish	
2017	May 29, 2017	Penn (JV) (2)	29-14	Fishers (JV)	Moose Rugby Grounds; Elkhart, IN	Royal Irish (JV); Carroll (JV)		
2018	May 28, 2018	Fishers (JV)	31-12	Royal Irish (JV)	Cyntheanne Park; Fishers, IN	Culver (JV); Penn (JV)		

==== Junior Varsity Challenge Cup Champion ====
Season	Date	Winner	Score	Loser	Site	Semifinalists	MVP	Sources
2017	May 29, 2017	Hamilton Southeast (JV)	34–19	Bishop Dwenger (JV)	Moose Rugby Grounds; Elkhart, IN	Culver (JV); St. Xavier (JV)		
2018	May 28, 2018	Carroll (JV)	36–7	Bishop Dwenger (JV)	Cyntheanne Park; Fishers, IN	Brownsburg (JV)		

=== Division 1 ===
In the spring of 1990, the Indiana Youth Rugby Association was formed with teams drawn from the Indianapolis area and spearheaded by "members and alumni of the Indianapolis Rugby Football Club[.]" Falling below the target of eight teams and 200 players, the inaugural season drew more than 100 players and produced five teams drawn from students of Scencina-Howe-Warren Central, Chatard, North Central, Lawrence Central and the Boys’ School. The teams competed in a seven-game schedule culminating in a playoff to crown a state champion. With Lawrence Central's victory in what would become the Division 1 state championship, the school was awarded both the inaugural state title and an Indianapolis city championship. By 2003, participation had expanded to 24 boys teams and 12 girls teams statewide.

==== Varsity State Champion ====
Season	Date	Winner	Score	Loser	Site	Semifinalists	MVP	Sources
1990	May 13, 1990	Lawrence Central	3–0	Northside Raiders	American Heritage Park; Indianapolis, IN	Charlton; Red Devils		
1991	May 11, 1991	Ben Davis	11–0	North Central	Lake Sullivan Sports Complex; Indianapolis, IN	Lawrence Central (3rd); Lawrence North		
1992	May 9, 1992	Ben Davis (2)	4–0	North Central	Lake Sullivan Sports Complex; Indianapolis, IN	Cathedral (3rd); Lawrence North		
1993	May 2, 1993	Ben Davis (3)	16–11	Knightstown		Cathedral (3rd); Lawrence North		
1994	May 7, 1994	Knightstown	17–0	Carmel		Wellington (3rd); Ben Davis		
1995	May 6, 1995	Wellington	27–10	Carmel	Lake Sullivan Sports Complex; Indianapolis, IN	North Central (3rd); Morton Memorial		
1996	May 4, 1996	Morton/Knightstown	5–0	Wellington		North Central (3rd); Ben Davis		
1997	May 24, 1997	North Central	29–0	Penn	Lake Sullivan Sports Complex; Indianapolis, IN	Columbus (3rd)	Jonathan Younger (MVP) & Adam Stockholm (MVB); North Central	
1998	May 9, 1998							
1999		North Central	–	Penn				
2000	May 27, 2000	Bloomington South	22–0	Carmel	Lake Sullivan Sports Complex; Indianapolis, IN	Penn (3rd)		
2001*	May 12, 2001	Cathedral	18–5	North Central	Major Taylor Velodrome; Indianapolis, IN	Marian; Pike		
2002	May 18, 2002	Penn	37–8	North Central		Mishawaka; Pike	Tim Bugg; Penn	
2003	May 24, 2003	Penn	29–17	Pike	River Road; Carmel, IN	Cathedral; Marian	Ben Weber; Penn	
2004	May 22, 2004	Bishop Dwenger	14–5	Pike	River Road Park Carmel, IN	Brownsburg		
2005	May 30, 2005	Penn	20–17	Brownsburg	Moose Rugby Grounds; Elkhart, IN	Marian; Pike		
2006		Cathedral		North Central	Moose Rugby Grounds; Elkhart, IN	Marian		
2007	May 28, 2007	North Central	22–3	Brownsburg	Moose Rugby Grounds; Elkhart, IN	Marian; Penn		
2008	May 26, 2008	Cathedral Royal Irish	–		Richard Wigh Fields; Columbus, IN			
2009	May 25, 2009	Cathedral Royal Irish	–	Penn	Moose Rugby Grounds; Elkhart, IN		Jason Harker; Penn	
2010	May 31, 2010	Cathedral Royal Irish	–	Brownsburg	Richard Wigh Fields; Columbus, IN			
2011	May 30, 2011	Cathedral Royal Irish	15–10	Penn	Moose Rugby Grounds; Elkhart, IN	Brownsburg		
2012	May 28, 2012	Cathedral Royal Irish	38–12	Penn	Richard Wigh Fields; Columbus, IN	Carmel; Notre Dame de La Salette		
2013	May 27, 2013	Cathedral Royal Irish	24–21	Penn	Cyntheanne, Park; Fishers, IN	Brownsburg	Max Schroeder; Cathedral Royal Irish	
2014	May 31, 2014	North Central	29–22	Fishers	Moose Rugby Grounds; Elkhart, IN	Culver; Hamilton Southeastern	Trevor Shirley; North Central	
2015	May 30, 2016	Hamilton Southeastern	7–5	Fishers	Moose Rugby Grounds; Elkhart, IN	Bishop Dwenger; Avon	Tyler Janney; Hamilton Southeastern	
2016	May 30, 2016	Fishers	76–3	Avon	Cyntheanne Park; Fishers, IN	Bishop Dwenger; North Central	Michael Nettleton; Fishers	
2017	May 29, 2017	Carmel	21-10	Avon	Moose Rugby Grounds; Elkhart, IN	Leo; Trinity		
2018	May 28, 2018	Leo	29–24	Avon	Cyntheanne Park; Fishers, IN	Noblesville; North Central		
2019	May 27, 2019	Leo	38–5	North Central	Moose Rugby Grounds; Elkhart, IN	Avon; Noblesville		
2020		Cancelled due to COVID						
2021	May 31, 2021	Carmel	24-23	Pendleton	Moose Rugby Grounds; Elkhart, IN	Avon; Marian	Jackson McCart; Carmel	
2022	May 30, 2022	Pendleton	40-17	Leo	Moose Rugby Grounds; Elkhart, IN	Avon	Hunter Branham; Pendleton	
2023	May 29, 2023	Pendleton (2)	20-20**	Avon	Cyntheanne Park; Fishers, IN		Nick Trout; Pendleton	
2024	May 27, 2024	Pendleton (3)	38-7	Penn	Cyntheanne Park; Fishers, IN		Andrew Evans; Pendleton	
2025	May 26, 2025	Pendleton (4)	34-12	Mudsock (HSE)	Cyntheanne Park; Fishers, IN		Garrett Pederson; Pendleton	
2026	May 25, 2026	Pendleton (5)	22-18	Mudsock (HSE)	Kuntz Stadium; Indianapolis, IN		Elijah Pimental; Pendleton	

* – Penn did not compete in state tournament due to conflict with national championship tournament schedule.

** – Pendleton won following double overtime on Sudden Victory Kicks 3–2.

==== Varsity Challenge Cup ====
Season	Date	Winner	Score	Loser	Site	Semifinalists	MVP	Sources
2017	May 29, 2017	North Central	27-22	Warsaw	Moose Rugby Grounds; Elkhart, IN	Columbus; Zionsville		
2018	May 28, 2018	Arsenal Tech	29–19	Angola	Cyntheanne Park; Fishers, IN	Carmel; Columbus		
2019	May 27, 2019	Carmel	55–5	Arsenal tech	Moose Rugby Grounds; Elkhart, IN	Marian; Trinity		

==== Junior Varsity ====
Historically, top-level rugby teams in Indiana would commit a B-side to playing in Division 2. In 2012, a formal Junior Varsity championship was implemented. It was abandoned following the 2016 season.

Season	Date	Winner	Score	Loser	Site	Semifinalists	MVP	Sources
2012	May 28, 2012	Penn (JV)	10–7	Cathedral (JV)	Richard Wigh Fields; Columbus, IN	Carmel (JV)		
2013	May 27, 2013	Penn (JV)	39–7	Notre Dame de La Salette (JV)	Cyntheanne Park; Fishers, IN	Brownsburg	Cory Christman; Penn	
2014	May 31, 2014	Hamilton Southeastern (JV)	13–12	Fishers (JV)	Moose Rugby Grounds; Elkhart, IN	Culver (JV); North Central (JV)		
2015	May 30, 2015	Bishop Dwenger (JV)	18–0	Hamilton Southeastern (JV)	Moose Rugby Grounds; Elkhart, IN	Fishers (JV)	Charlie Perez; Bishop Dwenger	
2016	May 30, 2016	Fishers (JV)	63–0	Hamilton Southeastern (JV)	Cyntheanne Park; Fishers, IN	Bishop Dwenger (JV)	Mason Miller; Fishers	

=== Division 2 ===
Season	Date	Winner	Score	Loser	Site	Semifinalists	MVP	Sources
1998		Carmel (JV)	15–10 (2OT)	Lawrence				
1999	May 9, 1999	Pike	38–12	Carmel (JV)	Major Taylor Velodrome; Indianapolis, IN			
2000	May 27, 2000	Marian	–	Noblesville	Lake Sullivan Sports Complex; Indianapolis, IN			
2001	May 12, 2001	Carroll	12–0	Noblesville	Major Taylor Velodrome; Indianapolis, IN	North Central (B); Pendleton		
2002		Pike	–			North Central (B)		
2003			–					
2004		Hamilton Southeastern	–					
2005	May 30, 2005	Columbus	16–15	Bloomington North	Moose Rugby Grounds; Elkhart, IN	Penn (B)		
2006		Penn (B)	23–15	Cathedral (B)		Lawrence North; Noblesville		
2007	May 28, 2007	Noblesville	12–7	Columbus	Moose Rugby Grounds; Elkhart, IN	Edgewood; Penn (B)		
2008	May 26, 2008	Hamilton Southeastern	–	Pendleton	Richard Wigh Fields; Columbus, IN	Columbus		
2009	May 25, 2009	Cathedral (B)	–	Hamilton Southeastern	Moose Rugby Grounds; Elkhart, IN	South Bend Mercenaries		
2010	May 31, 2010	Zionsville	–	Columbus	Richard Wigh Fields; Columbus, IN	Penn (JV) (3rd); Noblesville (4th)	Columbus, IN	
2011	May 30, 2011	Penn (JV)	12–5	Bloomington	Moose Rugby Grounds; Elkhart, IN	Lawrence Zionsville		
2012		Columbus	15–13	Culver	Richard Wigh Fields; Columbus, IN	Indianapolis Tech; Zionsville		
2013	May 27, 2013	Arsenal Tech	–	Carroll			Shawn Nevers; Arsenal Tech	
2014	May 31, 2014	Warsaw	29–10	Pike	Moose Rugby Grounds; Elkhart, IN	Angola; Bloomington (Dev)	Jason Taylor; Warsaw	
2015	May 30, 2015	Carroll	15–7	Pike	Moose Rugby Grounds; Elkhart, IN	Angola; Arsenal Tech	Derek Longenberger; Carroll	
2016	May 30, 2016	Carroll	52–10	Pike	Cyntheanne Park; Fishers, IN	Homestead; Arsenal Tech	JP Anzini; Carroll	
No Division 2 Boys Competition in 2017–2023
2024	May 27, 2024	Westfield	26-3	Carroll	Cyntheanne Park; Fishers, IN		Casey Graybill Westfield	
2025	May 26, 2025	Brownsburg	12-5	Leo	Cyntheanne Park; Fishers, IN			
2026	May 25, 2026	Royal Irish	27-22	Noblesville	Kuntz Stadium; Indianapolis, IN		Yan Tioua; Noblesville	

== Girls Championships ==
=== Super League ===
Season	Date	Winner	Score	Loser	Site	Semifinalists	MVP	Sources
2018	May 2018	Warsaw	45–15	North Central	Moose Rugby Grounds, Elkhart, IN	Penn; Pike		
2019	May 27, 2019	North Central	50–15	Penn	Moose Rugby Grounds, Elkhart, IN	Pike; Warsaw Area		

=== Division 1 ===
Season	Date	Winner	Score	Loser	Site	Semifinalists	MVP	Sources
2000	May 27, 2000	Noblesville	3–0	Lawrence Central	Lake Sullivan Sports Complex; Indianapolis, IN	Carmel	Nicole Connett (MVP) & Katelyn Balach (MVB); Noblesville	
2001		Carmel	8–5	Bloomington				
2002		North Central	39–5	Carmel				
2003	May 24, 2003	Penn	22–15	North Central	River Road; Carmel, IN	Noblesville; South Bend Clay		
2004	May 22, 2004	Penn (2)	17–0	Lawrence North	Carmel, IN	Brownsburg		
2005		Warsaw	41–5	North Central				
2006		North Central (2)	–	Clay		Noblesville Chaos		
2007	May 28, 2007	North Central (3)	–	Brownsburg	Moose Rugby Grounds; Elkhart, IN	Noblesville		
2008	May 17, 2008	Noblesville (2)	10–5	North Central		Brownsburg; Carmel		
2009	May 25, 2009	North Central (4)	30–5	South Bend Mercenaries	Moose Rugby Grounds; Elkhart, IN	Noblesville		
2010	May 22, 2010	North Central (5)	–	Carmel	McCullough's Run Park; Columbus, IN			
2011	May 21, 2011	North Central (6)	34–0	Columbus	Richard Wigh Fields; Columbus, IN	Brownsburg; South Bend Mercenaries		
2012	May 19, 2012	North Central (7)	10–5	South Bend Mercenaries	North Central; Indianapolis, IN		Bianca McManus; South Bend Mercenaries	
2013		North Central (8)	–	Warsaw				
2014	May 31, 2014	North Central (9)	34–24	Warsaw	Moose Rugby Grounds; Elkhart, IN	Penn; Brownsburg	Pre Smiley; North Central	
2015	May 30, 2015	North Central (10)	32–17	Penn	Moose Rugby Grounds; Elkhart, IN	Warsaw; Arsenal Tech	Yami Hernandez; North Central	
2016	May 30, 2016	Warsaw (2)	34–12	Arsenal Tech	Cyntheanne Park; Fishers, IN	Penn; Pike	Whitney Boren; Warsaw	
2017	May 29, 2017	Penn (3)	34–22	North Central	Moose Rugby Grounds; Elkhart, IN	Pike; Warsaw		
2018	May 28, 2018	Carroll	68–17	Brownsburg	Cyntheanne Park; Fishers, IN	Avon; Ft. Wayne		
2019	May 27, 2019	Carroll (2)	84–0	Fishers	Moose Rugby Grounds; Elkhart, IN	Ft. Wayne High Schools; Westfield		

==== Varsity Challenge Cup ====
Season	Date	Winner	Score	Loser	Site	Semifinalists	MVP	Sources
2017	May 29, 2017	Avon	43–15	Westfield	Moose Rugby Grounds; Elkart, IN	Carmel		
2018	May 28, 2018	Westfield	66–5	Fishers	Cyntheanne Park; Fishers, IN	Noblesville		
2019	May 27, 2019	Brownsburg	20–12	Noblesville	Moose Rugby Grounds; Elkhart, IN			

=== Division 2 ===
Season	Date	Winner	Score	Loser	Site	Semifinalists	MVP	Sources
2000		Noblesville	–					
2011	May 22, 2011	Bishop Dwenger	–	North Central (B)	Richard Wigh Fields; Columbus, IN		Brie Rahrig; Bishop Dwenger	

== Fall 7s Championships ==
Following the induction of the shortcode of Rugby Union, known as Rugby sevens, into the 2016 Summer Olympics, Rugby Indiana added a high school fall 7s competition to augment its XVs spring competitions. The inaugural season was 2016 and consists of a 4-week season, with games on Sundays. For the first three weeks, each team/side got a minimum of two matches on each Sunday. The first three weeks scores/results did not count toward the ranking for championship. The 4th week was a championship tournament.

Source: Rugby Indiana
Source: Rugby Indiana

=== Boys ===
Season	Date	Winner	Score	Loser	Site	Semifinalists	MVP	MVP
2016	October 9, 2016	Carroll	22-12	Penn	Moose Rugby Grounds; Elkhart, IN	Broad Ripple (3rd); Avon		
2017	October 13, 2017							
2018	October 14, 2018	Hamilton Southeastern	21–12	Penn	Moose Rugby Grounds; Elkhart, IN		Donovan Riley; Hamilton Southeastern	

=== Girls ===
Season	Date	Winner	Score	Loser	Site	Semifinalists	MVP	Sources
2016	October 9, 2016	Penn	25–5	Indianapolis #1	Moose Rugby Grounds; Elkhart, IN	Bishop Dwenger (3rd); Hamilton #1	Kathleen Gearhart; Penn	
2017	October 13, 2017	North Central	24–7	Hamilton United	Moose Rugby Grounds; Elkhart, IN	Avon; Bishop Dwenger		
2018	October 14, 2018	Carroll			Moose Rugby Grounds; Elkhart, IN			

== Indiana Teams at Midwest Tournament ==
=== Boys ===
Season	Date	Location	Teams Participating	Results	Sources
1990					
1991					
1992					
1993					
1994					
1995					
1996					
1997					
1998					
1999					
2000					
2001					
2002					
2003			Penn	Penn – Champion	
2004	May 1–2, 2004	Elkhart, IN	Clay; Marian; Penn	Penn – Champion; Marian – 9th Clay – 12th	
2005		Elkhart, IN	Brownsburg; Penn; Marian		
2006					
2007					
2008					
2009					
2010					
2011					
2012					
2013					
2014					
2015					
2016					
2017	May 6–7, 2017	Elkhart, IN	Brownsburg (s); Carroll (c); Marian (c); Penn (s); Royal Irish (c)	Brownsburg (s) – 5th Carroll (c) – 2nd Marian (c) – 8th Penn (s) – Champion; Royal Irish (c) – Champion	
2018	May 5–6, 2018	Elkhart, IN	Brownsburg; Carroll; Fishers; Penn; Royal Irish		
2019	May 4–5, 2019	Elkhart, IN	Brownsburg; Carroll; Fishers; Penn; Royal Irish	Penn – Champion; Royal Irish – 2nd Fishers – 3rd Brownsburg – 5th Carroll – 8th	
2020	May 2–3, 2020	Elkhart, IN			

(c) – represents club team designation
(s) – represents single-school team designation

In 2018, the Midwest tournament ceased the split between single-school and club teams.

=== Girls ===
Season	Date	Location	Teams Participating	Results	Sources
1990					
1991					
1992					
1993					
1994					
1995					
1996					
1997					
1998					
1999					
2000					
2001					
2002					
2003					
2004					
2005					
2006					
2007					
2008					
2009					
2010					
2011					
2012					
2013					
2014					
2015					
2016					
2017					
2018					
2019	April 27–28, 2019	Elkhart, IN	Carroll (s); Penn (s); Warsaw (s)	Carroll (s) – 7th Penn (s) – 6th Warsaw (s) – 5th	
2020	April 25–26, 2020	Elkhart, IN			

(c) – represents club team designation
(s) – represents single-school team designation

== Indiana Teams at National Championships ==
=== Boys ===
Season	Date	Location	Teams Participating	Results	Sources
1991		Indianapolis, IN			
1992		Doylestown, PA			
1993		Seattle, WA			
1994		Parker, CO			
1995		Minneapolis, MN			
1996		Fort Belvoir, VA			
1997		Provo, UT			
1998		Indianapolis, IN			
1999		Provo, UT			
2000		Provo, UT			
2001		Columbus, OH			
2002		Columbus, OH			
2003	May 16–17, 2003	Kelly, TX		Penn – 5th	
2004	May 22, 2004	Fort Worth, TX	Penn	Penn – 4th	
2005		Palo Alto, CA	Penn, Cathedral, Brownsburg	Penn – 3rd, Cathedral - 6th	
2006		Hanover, NH			
2007		Salt Lake City, UT	Penn	Penn – 3rd	
2008		Pittsburgh, PA	Notre Dame de La Salette (s); Penn (s)	Notre Dame de La Salette (s) – 2nd Penn (s) – 3rd	
2009		Pittsburgh, PA			
2010		Sandy, UT			
2011		Sandy, UT	Royal Irish (c)	Royal Irish (c) – 3rd	
2012		Sandy, UT	Penn (s); Royal Irish (c)	Penn (s) – 2nd Royal Irish (c) – Champion	
2013	May 16–18, 2013	Elkhart, IN	Brownsburg (ii); Notre Dame de La Salette (ii); Penn (s); Royal Irish (c)	Brownsburg (ii) – 3rd Notre Dame de La Salette (ii) – Penn (s) – 4th Royal Irish (c) – 2nd	
2014	May 16–18, 2014	Elkhart, IN	Brownsburg (s); Fishers (c); Notre Dame de La Salette (s); Penn (s); Royal Irish (c)	Royal Irish (c) – Champion; Fishers (c) – 7th Penn (s) – 3rd Notre Dame de La Salette (s) – 5th Brownsburg (s) – 7th	
2015		Charlotte, NC	Fishers (ii); Notre Dame de La Salette (ii); Penn (s); Royal Irish (c)	Fishers (ii) – 4th Notre Dame de La Salette (ii) – 3rd Penn (s) – 4th Royal Irish (c) – Champion	
2016		Charlotte, NC	Brownsburg (ii); Penn (s); Royal Irish (c)	Brownsburg (ii) – 3rd Penn (s) – 4th Royal Irish (c) – 2nd	
2017	May 18–20, 2017	Kansas City, MO	Brownsburg (ii); Fishers (s); Penn (s); Royal Irish (c)	Brownsburg (ii) – 3rd Fishers (s) – 8th Penn (s) – 3rd Royal Irish (c) – Champion	
2018	May 17–19, 2018	Kansas City, MO	Brownsburg (s); Fishers (s); Penn (s); Royal Irish (c)		
2019	May 16–18, 2019	Salt Lake City, UT	Penn (s); Royal Irish (c)		

In 2007, the national championship tournament split schools based upon whether their programs were made of students from a single school or a club of combined schools.

(c) – represents club team designation
(ii) – represents Tier II contestant
(s) – represents single-school team designation Source: Goff Rugby Report
Source: Boys High School Rugby National Championships

=== Girls ===
Season	Date	Location	Teams Participating	Results	Sources
2000					
2001					
2002					
2003					
2004					
2005					
2006					
2007					
2008					
2009					
2010					
2011					
2012					
2013					
2014					
2015					
2016	May 21–22, 2016	Ellensburg, WA	None Participating	–	
2017	May 19–20, 2017	Elkhart, IN	None Participating	–	
2018	May 18–19, 2018	Murfreesboro, TN	None Participating	–	
2019	May 17–18, 2019	Salt Lake City, UT	None Participating	–	

(c) – represents club team designation
(s) – represents single-school team designation

Source: Goff Rugby Report

== Mr. & Miss Rugby ==
Beginning in 2016, The Indianapolis Star added rugby to its list of Spring Award recipients. In 2019, the Star did not include rugby in its Spring Awards. Prior to that time, Mr. and Miss Rugby Indiana appears to have been selected by the Indiana Rugby Football Union, coinciding with all-state selections. The data below were sourced from Indiana newspapers searched through Newspapers.com from 1990 through 2019 and represent all information that could be gleaned therefrom.

=== Mr. Rugby ===
Season	Winner	Nominees	Sources
2001		Chad Murphy, Columbus	
2002	Ryan Cole; Penn		
2003	Ryan Cole (2); Penn		
2004	Chris McNamara (Northern Indiana); Marian		
2005			
2006			
2007			
2008			
2009			
2010			
2011			
2012			
2013			
2014			
2015			
2016	Satchel Carnine; Penn	Eric Bradley, Pike; Russell Lemaster, Royal Irish	
2017	Jonas Petrakopoulos; Royal Irish	Isaac Good, Brownsburg; William Vakalahi, Penn	
2018	Michael Nettleton; Fishers	Andy Guhl; Peyton Wall	
2019	Peyton Wall; Leo	Russell Lemaster	
2020	- --		
2021	Joseph Fabini; Bishop Dwenger	Zach White Asher Webb	
2022	Will Kaster; Pendleton	Tommy Hannon Wally Kennach	
2023	Hunter Branham; Pendleton	Mikey Cabreros Gage Poland	
2024	Nick Trout; Pendleton	Casey Graybill Max Brinker	
2025	Garrett Pederson; Pendleton	Tobin Peterson Noah Hughes	

=== Miss Rugby ===
Season	Winner	Nominees	Sources
2002	Gina Benbow; Carmel		
2003	Andrea Hunt (co-Miss Rugby), North Central; Kate Daley (co-Miss Rugby), Penn		
2004			
2005			
2006			
2007			
2008	Jessica Bammann; Brownsburg		
2009			
2010			
2011			
2012			
2013			
2014			
2015			
2016	Kathleen (Kat) Gearhart; Penn	Hannah Garcia, Warsaw; Victoria Jones, Noblesville	
2017	Kathleen (Kat) Gearhart (2); Penn	Tori Jones, Penn; Mikayla Tatum, Pike	
2018	Meagan Reed; Westfield	Sarah Duenas, Warsaw; Delayney Moyer, International	
2019	Meagan Reed (2); Westfield	Delayney Moyer	
2020	- --		
2021	Taylor Powell; North Central	Mikayla Mills	
2022	Taylor Powell (2); North Central	Chloe DeLeon Celia Watson	
2023	Josephine Allen; Ft. Wayne	Malana Ervin Arielle Noussa Fotso	
2024	Mia Blocher; Warsaw	Delaney Wiard Tessa Weisgerber Josie Hause	
2025	Arielle Fotso; Carmel	Lillian Stineberg Delaney Wiard	

== See also ==
- Midwest Rugby Football Union
- USA Rugby
