= Chicago Blaze (rugby union) =

American rugby union club

(United States) Blaze RFC
- Full name: Chicago Blaze Rugby Football Club
- Union: CARFU
- Nickname: The Blaze
- Founded: 1982
- Ground: Thornley Field
- President: Erik Otten
- Coach: Luke White
- League: Midwest Premiership League - Western Conference
1st kit	2nd kit

Official website
- www.chicagoblazerugby.com

Chicago Blaze Rugby Football Club is a rugby union club based in Lemont, Illinois. The Blaze's competes in the Midwest Rugby Football Union's Division I & Division III.

== History ==
In 1982, the Windy City Nomads merged with the Amoco Rugby Club to form the Chicago Blaze Rugby Football Club. The new club would retain the colors blue for Amoco and red for Nomads. The first Blaze jerseys had the red and blue hoops.

Peter Thornley, one of the founding members and was instrumental to the Blaze future by bring together the two clubs and making what had been just an idea of being the first club team in the United States to actually own its own pitch. Before the creation of the clubhouse and field in 1986, the Blaze played at the forest preserve fields on 75th St and Rt 53 in Naperville, but community disapproval of the social aspect of post game celebrations, was what ultimately led the club to look into buying their own field. The current facility includes 4 pitches and includes a new clubhouse opened in 2019.

The club has hosted numerous Illinois State High School Championships, CARFU Championships, Midwest Territorial Championships, USA Club Rugby Super Regionals in 2023 & 2024, and the Women's Premier League Rugby Championship in 2022.

The club continues to host the Midwest Rugby Football Union Championship each fall, as well as the Midwest Qualifier 7's tournament & Firehouse 7's tournaments in the summer.

Currently the club owns 15 acres of land with four irrigated fields, with the main field and practice field having lights, home and visitor locker room facilities with showers, and a clubhouse with a bar for post-match socials, parties and events. Development continues with a play area for kids, spectator stands, and a rugby facility. The Blaze have traveled abroad on several international tours to England (1989), Ireland (1994), Spain (1999) and New Zealand (2002). Since 2016, the Blaze, along with Assassins Rugby Football Club out of Winnipeg, Canada and Wisconsin Rugby Club compete in the annual Triangle Tour.

Over the past years, the Blaze have won Midwest Championships at the Division 1, 2 & 4 levels. The Blaze has competed in the National Championships in 1986, 1990, 1996, 2007, 2010, 2011, 2019, 2023, and 2025.

== Thornley Field ==
Field 1 is named Thornley Field in honor of one of our Founding Members, Pete Thornley.

== Club honors ==
- Midwest Champions 1989, 1997, 2019, 2022, 2024
- Division I National Final Four 1989
- Division IV Nats 2019
