= Alex Gordon (disambiguation) =

Alex Gordon is a former Major League Baseball player who played for the Kansas City Royals.

Alex Gordon may also refer to:

- Alex Gordon (police agent), a police infiltrator
- Alex Gordon, former collegiate basketball player, currently with Chorale Roanne in France
- Alex Gordon (athlete), footballer and athlete
- Sir Alex Gordon (architect) (1917–1999), Welsh architect
- Alex Gordon (writer-producer) (1922–2003), British writer and film producer
- Alex Gordon (footballer) (1940–1996), Scottish footballer
- Alex Gordon (priest) (born 1949), Provost of St Andrew's Cathedral, Inverness
- Alex Gordon (gridiron football) (born 1964), former NFL linebacker
- Alex Gordon (communist) (born 1966), British political activist and trade unionist
- Alex Gordon (rugby union) (born 1991), American rugby union footballer

== See also ==
- Alexander Gordon (disambiguation)
