= Schelto Kruijff =

Dutch surgical oncologist and academic researcher

Schelto Kruijff is a Dutch surgical oncologist and academic researcher, a professor of surgery affiliated with the University Medical Center Groningen (UMCG) and the University of Groningen (RUG). His work focuses on surgical oncology, the use of fluorescence-guided surgery, endocrine tumor treatment, and sustainability in healthcare.

== Education ==
In 2011, Kruijff earned a Doctor of Philosophy (PhD) degree at the University of Groningen, where his doctoral dissertation focused on biomarkers in melanoma. Following his doctorate, he completed postdoctoral training, including a TS Reeve Endocrine Surgery Fellowship at the University of Sydney, Australia. He later undertook additional fellowship experience in hepatobiliary surgery after returning to the Netherlands. Prior to his doctoral studies, he completed a surgical residency in abdominal and oncological surgery.

== Career ==
Kruijff holds a position as staff consultant in surgical oncology and endocrine surgery at the University Medical Center Groningen and is affiliated with the University of Groningen. He is also affiliated with Karolinska Institutet in Sweden, where he participates in research activities within molecular medicine and surgical sciences. His clinical practice includes the surgical treatment of endocrine tumors, such as thyroid and adrenal gland tumors, as well the treatment of adrenal tumors. He serves as head researcher of the Optical Molecular Imaging Group (OMIG), a multidisciplinary research group in Groningen that develops targeted and non-targeted fluorescence-guided techniques for surgical applications.

Kruijff has held roles in professional and academic organizations, including board membership of the Dutch Association of Oncological Surgery (NVCO). He was appointed Chief Green Officer of UMCG, a role focused on promoting sustainability and reducing the environmental impact of healthcare delivery.

== Research ==
Kruijff's research covers surgical innovation, oncological outcomes, imaging techniques, and perioperative technologies. His work includes studies on fluorescence-guided surgery and optical imaging in thyroid and parathyroid procedures, as well as translational and clinical research in cancer care.

He has contributed to academic and public discussions on sustainable innovation in surgery and healthcare systems, including lectures and media interviews addressing environmentally responsible medical practice.

== Fields of work ==
- Studies on quantitative near-infrared fluorescence imaging using indocyanine green in surgical settings.
- Research on PET/CT imaging in medullary thyroid cancer to support surgical decision-making.
- Investigations into intestinal and parathyroid perfusion measurement techniques.
- Early clinical research on melanoma biomarkers.
