= Albany High School (New York) =

High school in Albany, New York

Coordinates: 42.666821°N 73.78268°W

Location
- 700 Washington Avenue; Albany, New York 12203; United States

Information
- Type: Urban public high school
- Motto: Assiduity
- Established: September 7, 1868
- School district: City School District of Albany
- Principal: Jodi M. Commerford
- Faculty: 199.19
- Grades: 9–12
- Enrollment: 2,676 (2022–23)
- Student to teacher ratio: 13.44
- Colors: Blue, gray, and occasionally white
- Mascot: Falcon
- Accreditation: Middle States Association of Colleges and Schools International Baccalaureate World Schools
- Nicknames: Albany High, AHS
- Website: https://www.albanyschools.org/schools/albanyhigh/index

Albany High School (AHS) in Albany, New York, United States, is a public high school with an enrollment of about 2,670 students for the 2023-2024 school year. The school is part of the City School District of Albany. It opened on September 7, 1868, as the Albany Free Academy. Albany High has been located at 700 Washington Avenue since 1974. The school is an International Baccalaureate school with an Advanced Placement program. The school newspaper is The Nest (published online, it replaced the longtime print newspaper The Patroon, in 2012), the literary magazine is Inkblot, and the yearbook is Prisms.

Prior to 1974, Albany had two high schools, Albany High and the former Philip Schuyler High School in the South End. The schools merged for the 1974-75 school year as Albany High, located at 700 Washington Avenue. Albany High School is since then the only comprehensive public high school in the city.

Until 2011, Albany High was divided into two large administrative divisions known as the "North House" and the "South House." Each house had its own cafeteria and administrative offices. In 2011, the school created four themed learning communities referred to as academies (Citizenship Academy, Discovery Academy, Innovation Academy and Leadership Academy); all students are assigned to one of the academies.

In November 2015, city voters narrowly rejected a $196 million plan to renovate and expand Albany High by a close vote of 5,794 to 5,897. Voters approved a revised $179.9 million proposal in February 2016. Construction began in 2018, to be completed in four phases. The full Rebuilding Albany High School project was completed prior to the 2025-26 school year.

== Academics ==
Albany High has a longstanding Advanced Placement program offering 21 courses. Some AP classes count toward the school's array of 29 College in the High School (CHS) programs, which allow students to take college courses at a steep discount, and apply the credits elsewhere. Most courses are offered through Hudson Valley Community College (HVCC). Additionally, the school has a Career and Technical Education program, offering courses in accounting, automotive technologies, barbering, business administration, construction technologies, cosmetology, culinary arts, education, health science (CNA), nutrition, health & wellness, and pre-engineering, some of which give students a seal of endorsement on their diploma, and community service hours. 43 clubs are offered, furthering enrichment for students.

Albany High School's automotive workshop.

Albany High has been included in Newsweek's list of America's Top Public High Schools on multiple occasions, most recently in 2010 (when it ranked #976).

=== School receivership ===
In 2015 the New York State Education Department classified Albany High School as a "Struggling School" and placed it under the school receivership of the Superintendent of the City School District of Albany. If the school did not demonstrate improvement in student performance within two years an Independent Receiver would be appointed by the district to control decisions. As of 2019, Albany High School was no longer in receivership.

== Campus ==
The front walk-up of Albany High. A rear view of Albany High's pre-renovation academic building showing Towers One, Two, and Three, colloquially known by students as the "Old Building".

Albany High's current location at 700 Washington Avenue opened in 1974. The building is mainly silver & gray paneling with blue accents and large swaths of windows, remodeled from the old 1970s brick construction. The remodel, started in 2018 and completed in 2025, added nearly 200,000 square feet to the previous 378,000-square-foot complex, integrating all of the Career and Technical Education spaces which had been housed in the former Abrookin Career and Technical Center with the main building. The building has three floors and is divided into academic wings, each housing a different department. (CTE, Music, Art, Academic, etc.) Each wing is purpose-built for its subjects. There are two cafeterias, divided by academy, and each floor is assigned to each of the four Academies, with the most recently remodeled portion, the "New Old Building" housing the Citizenship Academy on its third floor. There are numerous athletic spaces, including 2 gymnasiums, a pool, a weight room, a cardio room, a dance studio, and several outdoor fields. The high school is a "closed campus", meaning that students may not leave or re-enter without permission.

== Demographics ==
As of the 2024 academic year, Albany High School has about 2,900 students enrolled. Of those students, 41% are African-American, 16% are White (non-Hispanic), 25% are Hispanic, 13% are Asian, and 5% are Native American or multiracial. 68% of students are economically disadvantaged. The school has 210 teachers and 21 other professional staff. The student-to-teacher ratio is about 14:1.

== Notable alumni ==
- Adam Aleksic – Class of 2019 – linguist who graduated from Harvard and now runs a YouTube channel.
- Robert Alter - Class of 1953 - Scholar and translator of The Hebrew Bible (Professor Emeritus, UC Berkeley)
- Glen Barker – Houston Astros outfielder
- Alex Gordon (rugby union) Rugby flanker for Allegheny Rugby Union
- Tracy Baskin – Former Olympiac track and field athlete in the 800 meters, former 4 by 4 co-world record holder, #3 rank 1988 US men 800m
- Carolee Carmello – Broadway actress who made her Broadway debut in City of Angels; she starred in Lestat, Parade and Mamma Mia!.
- Lionel Chalmers – Basketball player who went to Xavier University and the NBA. He was drafted by the L.A. Clippers and traded to the Minnesota Timberwolves for the 2005–2006 NBA season.
- Gene Cretz – Class of 1968 – former U.S. Ambassador to Libya, and U.S. Ambassador to Ghana; taught English at Albany High from 1977 to 1979.
- William Devane – Film and television actor
- Alfred Freedman, M.D. – Class of 1933 – Psychiatrist who headed the American Psychiatric Association when it declared homosexuality was not a mental disorder in 1973.
- Stefon Harris – Class of 1991 – Jazz musician, vibraphonist
- Charlie Leigh – NFL player for the 17–0 1972 Miami Dolphins Super Bowl Champions, primarily as a kick returner
- James Hilton Manning, mayor of Albany
- Catherine McCabe – Class of 1969 – Acting Administrator of the Environmental Protection Agency in 2017
- Michael Premo – Class of 1999 – Award-winning artist, activist, and organizer. He was a central figure in Occupy Wall Street and Occupy Sandy movements, co-director of the participatory documentary, Sandy Storyline and creator of the documentary project Housing is a Human Right.
- Carrie Turner – Popular New York actress in the 1880s and 1890s.
- Charlayne Woodard – Award-winning American film, stage and television actor and playwright

== Principals ==
- 1868 – 1886: Arianna M Gauthier
- 1886 – 1911: Oscar D. Robinson
- 1911 – 1916: Frank A. Gallup
- 1916 – 1951: Harry E. Pratt
- 1951 – 1959: Stanley Heason
- 1959 – 1967: Douglas W. Lincoln
- 1968 – 1986: Armand Rodriguez
- 1987 – 1995: David McGuire
- 1995 – 1998: Willard Washburn
- 1998 – 2001: John Metallo
- 2001 – 2002: John Pellitier
- 2002 – 2006: Michael T. Cioffi
- 2006 – 2009: F. Maxine Fantroy-Ford
- 2009 – 2012: David C. McCalla
- 2012 – 2015: Cecily L. Wilson-Turner
- 2015 – 2018: Dale Getto
- 2018 – : Jodi M. Commerford

== See also ==
- Albany City School District
- List of high schools in New York (state)
