= Alex Gordon (rugby union) =

- Born: Alexander Aaron Gordon; July 30, 1991 (age 35) Albany, New York, U.S.
- Height: 5 ft 8 in (1.8 m)
- Weight: 11 st 11 lb (74.8 kg)
- School: Albany High School
- University: Slippery Rock University of Pennsylvania

Rugby union career
- Position: Flanker
Amateur team(s)
Years	Team	Apps	(Points)
2007–2009	ALB. Bulldogs	24	(110)
Senior career
Years	Team	Apps	(Points)
2009-	Shamrock RFC	81	(55)
- Correct as of May 7, 2014

Alexander Aaron Gordon (born July 30, 1991) is an American rugby union player who plays flanker for Shamrock RFC. He was one of the more recognizable players due to his small stature. He stands 5 ft 8 in (1.73 m) tall and weighs in at 195 lb (88 kg).

== Club career ==
Gordon made his Albany Bulldogs debut in March 2007, taking the field as the number 8 and leading the team to initial victory over their rival Saratoga Mustangs. While the team began to struggle over the course of the Capital District Youth Rugby season, Gordon flourished as the team's defensive stalwart and was named to the 2nd Team All-CDYR Team and was declared team MVP without scoring a single try.

Gordon was named captain of the Bulldogs at the beginning of the 2008 season and continued to lead them throughout the 2009 season, sevens season, and post-seasons. He submitted his greatest season during the Bulldog's 2009 season, scoring a league record 16 tries and bringing his career total to a record 22 tries. He was named 1st Team All-CDYR for the second consecutive year while also earning League MVP honors. The Bulldogs experienced similar success, taking a 5-1 record and the 1st seed into the CDYR Post-Season Tournament, ultimately finishing second to the Berkshire United RFC after a controversial 12-12 overtime game went to sudden death kick rules.

== College career ==
Gordon announced his decision at the conclusion of the 2009 CDYR Tournament that he would pursue an education from, and continue his playing career at, Slippery Rock University of Pennsylvania. While studying Safety and Environmental Management, he joined the local Shamrock RFC men's team. After an unsuccessful attempt at playing number eight again (due to his size), Gordon changed positions to wing. A fruitful rookie year was derailed by a torn PCL due to an ill-advised backflip attempt, but Gordon continued playing through the injury, worsening the severity. Gordon continued playing until September 2011, when he enlisted in the National Guard. After going through BCT in Fort Benning and completing a deployment to the Middle East, Gordon returned to the Shamrocks. During the Fall 2013 season, Gordon made the positional switch to Flanker. It was a very successful change, as Gordon led the Shamrocks in scoring with 7 tries and being voted team MVP. The next semester, Gordon was elected captain and enjoyed another successful tournament season. Currently, Gordon is living in Slippery Rock, Pennsylvania full-time, training for the upcoming 2014 rugby season.
