= Wisconsin Women's Rugby Football Club =

US women's rugby union club, based in Madison, Wisconsin

The Wisconsin Women's Rugby Football Club (WWRFC) is an amateur Division I women's rugby team in Madison, Wisconsin.

The WWRFC plays competitively in the Wisconsin Rugby Football Union, a local area union of the Midwest Rugby Football Union and the USA Rugby. The team is a tax-exempt non-profit organization as a member of Madison United Rugby. The team holds all practices and home matches at the Wisconsin Rugby Sports Complex.

== History ==
The Wisconsin Women's Rugby Football Club was founded in 1975 in Madison, Wisconsin. The team was affiliated with the University of Wisconsin in its early years until distinctions were drawn between senior club and collegiate teams in the early 1990s.

The late 1990s and early 2000s saw the WWRFC appear on the national rugby scene. From 1998-2001 the team competed in the USA Rugby National Championship tournaments regularly.

In 2006, the WWRFC finished fourth in the Midwest and 17th overall in the nation. The team traveled to Seattle to play the 16th-ranked Emerald City Mudhens in one of four 2007 USA Rugby Division I Women's Challenge Matches on May 26, 2007.

The WWRFC earned appearances in the Midwest Women's Division II Final Four every season from 2011-2016, appearing in the final match during four of those seasons.

The WWRFC won the Midwest Women's Division II Championship in 2015 and 2016, defeating the Cincinnati Kelts in 2015 and the Milwaukee Scylla in 2016 for the Championships.

In 2015, the WWRFC won the USA Rugby Women's Division II Club National Championship, defeating the Sacramento Amazons 38-28 at Infinity Park in Glendale, CO.

In 2016, the WWRFC returned to the USA Rugby Women's Division II Club National Championship. They finished as national runners-up, losing to the Life West Gladiatrix 20-66 at Infinity Park in Glendale, CO.

After winning the Midwest Women's Division II Championships two years in a row the WWRFC were promoted to the Midwest Women's Division I. In the fall of 2017 the WWRFC made it to the Midwest Women's Division I Championship where they lost to the Detroit Women.

The WWRFC has been represented by its current and past players on state, regional and national all-star teams, including:

- Wisconsin Under-23 Women's Select-Side Team
- Wisconsin Senior Women's Select-Side Team
- Midwest Women's Under-23 Select-Side Team (Midwest Thunderbirds)
- Midwest Senior Women's 7s Select-Side Team (Midwest Thunderbirds)
- Midwest Senior Women's 15s Select-Side Team (Midwest Thunderbirds)
- U.S. Women's Under-23 National Team (USA Eagles)
- U.S. Women's 7s Developmental Team (USA Eagles)
- U.S. Women's National Team (USA Eagles)

== See also ==
- Rugby union in the United States
