= Chicago Blaze =

Chicago Blaze may refer to:

- Chicago Blaze (basketball), a professional sports team that played in the National Women's Basketball League from 2002 to 2005
- Chicago Blaze (ice hockey), a professional sports team that played in the All American Hockey League in 2008-09
- Chicago Blaze (rugby), a rugby union club founded in 1982
