= List of international trips made by Nayib Bukele =

The following is a list of international trips conducted by Nayib Bukele, the mayor of San Salvador from May 2015 to April 2018 and the president of El Salvador since June 2019.

== Mayor of Nuevo Cuscatlán ==
The following list, it shows the international trips made by Nayib Bukele as a mayor of Nuevo Cuscatlán that he took office on 1 May 2012 to 30 April 2015.

| Image | Country | Cities visited | Date(s) | Notes |
|---|---|---|---|---|
| | United States | New York City | 31 October 2014 | Spoke at the United Nations as a part of World Cities Day |

== Mayor of San Salvador ==
The following list, it shows the international trips made by Nayib Bukele as a mayor of San Salvador that took office on 1 May 2015 to 30 April 2018.

| Image | Country | Cities visited | Date(s) | Notes |
|---|---|---|---|---|
| | United States | Washington, D.C. | 11 September 2016 | Official visit |
| Nayib Bukele with Taiwanese President Tsai Ing-wen | Taiwan | Taipei | 23 February 2017 | Official visit |
| | Israel | Jerusalem | February 2018 | Official visit |
| | Costa Rica | San José | 20 April 2018 | Attended the XVIII summit of the Union of Ibero-American Capital Cities |

== President of El Salvador ==
The following list, it shows the international trips made by Nayib Bukele as a president of the El Salvador that he took office since 1 June 2019.

| Image | Country | Cities visited | Date(s) | Notes |
|---|---|---|---|---|
| | Mexico | Tapachula | 20 June 2019 | Met with Andrés Manuel López Obrador |
| Nayib Bukele with United States President Donald Trump | United States | New York City, Washington, D.C. | 26 September 2019 | State visit, spoke at the United Nations General Assembly |
| Nayib Bukele with Japanese Prime Minister Shinzo Abe | Japan | Tokyo | 29 November 2019 | State visit |
| Nayib Bukele with Chinese General Secretary Xi Jinping | China | Beijing | 4 December 2019 | State visit |
| Nayib Bukele with Qatari Minister of Energy Saad Sherida al-Kaabi | Qatar | Doha | 12 December 2019 | State visit |
| | Guatemala | Guatemala City | 27 January 2020 | State visit |
| | United States | Washington, D.C. | February 2021 | U.S. President Joe Biden refused to meet Bukele. |
| Nayib Bukele with Turkish President Recep Tayyip Erdoğan | Turkey | Ankara | 28 January 2022 | State visit |
| Nayib Bukele visiting Google | United States | Mountain View | 29 August 2023 | Signed a 7-year agreement with Google |
| Nayib Bukele speaking at the United Nations | United States | New York City | 19 September 2023 | Spoke at the United Nations General Assembly |
| | United States | National Harbor | 22 February 2024 | Spoke at the Conservative Political Action Conference |
| | United States | Austin | 20 September 2024 | Met with Elon Musk |
| | United States | New York City | 24 September 2024 | Spoke at the United Nations General Assembly |
| Nayib Bukele with Javier Milei | Argentina | Buenos Aires | 30 September – 1 October 2024 | State visit |
| Nayib Bukele with Rodrigo Chaves Robles | Costa Rica | San José | 11–12 November 2024 | State visit |
| Nayib Bukele with Donald Trump | United States | Washington, D.C. | 12–14 April 2025 | State visit |
| Nayib Bukele with Rodrigo Chaves Robles | Costa Rica | San Rafael | 13–14 January 2026 | State visit |
| | United States | Washington, D.C. | 5 February 2026 | Attended the National Prayer Breakfast |
| Nayib Bukele at the Shield of the Americas Summit | United States | Miami | 7 March 2026 | Participated in the signing of the Shield of the Americas |
| | United States | Washington, D.C. | 16 July 2026 | Met with Donald Trump |

== Canceled visits ==
| Image | Country | Cities | Date(s) | Event | Notes |
|---|---|---|---|---|---|
| Salvadoran Minister of Foreign Affairs Alexandra Hill Tinoco (top row, 4th from left) attended the summit in place of Bukele. | United States | Los Angeles | 6–10 June 2022 | 9th Summit of the Americas | Bukele was one of multiple Latin American heads of state who did not attend the 9th Summit of the Americas. He did not attend due to frustration over the United States' criticism of his government regarding alleged corruption and human rights abuses. |
| | Chile | Santiago | 20 May 2026 | State visit | Planned official visit to meet President José Antonio Kast and commemorate the 150th anniversary of diplomatic relations between Chile and El Salvador. The visit did not take place after negotiations stalled, leaving it indefinitely postponed. |
