= Alexander Gordon =

Alexander Gordon may refer to:

== Law and politics ==
- Alexander Gordon, Lord Rockville (1739–1792), Scottish judge
- Alexander Gordon (Australian politician) (1815–1903), English-born Australian politician and barrister
- Sir Alexander Gordon (judge) (1858–1942), Australian lawyer and judge
- Alexander Theodore Gordon (1881–1919), Scottish politician
- Sir Alexander Gordon (Northern Ireland politician) (1882–1967)

== Military ==
- Alexander Gordon (general) (1670–1752), Scottish general of the Russian army and Jacobite
- Alexander Gordon (British Army officer, born 1781) (1781–1873)
- Sir Alexander Gordon (British Army officer, born 1786) (1786–1815)

== Nobility ==
- Alexander Gordon, 1st Earl of Huntly (died 1470), Scottish magnate
- Alexander Gordon, 3rd Earl of Huntly (died 1524), Scottish nobleman
- Alexander Gordon, Master of Sutherland (died 1530), Scottish magnate
- Alexander Gordon, 12th Earl of Sutherland (died 1594), Scottish landowner
- Alexander Gordon, 2nd Duke of Gordon (c. 1678–1728), Scottish peer
- Alexander Gordon, 4th Duke of Gordon (1743–1827), Scottish nobleman
- Alexander Gordon, 7th Marquess of Aberdeen and Temair (1955–2020), British peer

== Religion ==
- Alexander Gordon (bishop of Aberdeen) (died 1518), Scottish churchman
- Alexander Gordon (bishop of Galloway) (died 1575), Scottish churchman
- Alexander Gordon (Unitarian) (1841–1931), English Unitarian minister and religious historian

== Others ==
- Alexander Gordon (pioneer) (1635–1697), Scottish settler in New England
- Sir Alexander Gordon of Earlston (1650–1726), Scottish gentleman and Covenanter
- Alexander Gordon (antiquary) (c. 1692–1755), Scottish antiquary and singer
- Alexander Gordon (physician) (1752–1799), Scottish physician
- Alexander Snow Gordon (died 1803), American silversmith and inn-keeper
- Alexander Gordon (brewer) (1818–1895), Scottish brewer and philanthropist
- Alexander Esmé Gordon (1910–1993), Scottish architect
- Sandy Grant Gordon (1931–2020), Scottish distiller
- Alexander Gordon (historian) (born 1937), Russian historiographer and socio-anthropologist
- Alexander Gordon (journalist) (born 1964), Russian radio and television personality

== See also ==
- Alex Gordon (disambiguation)
- Alexander Hamilton-Gordon (disambiguation)
- Alexander Gordon Smith (born 1979), British author
