= Environmental resource management =

Type of resource management

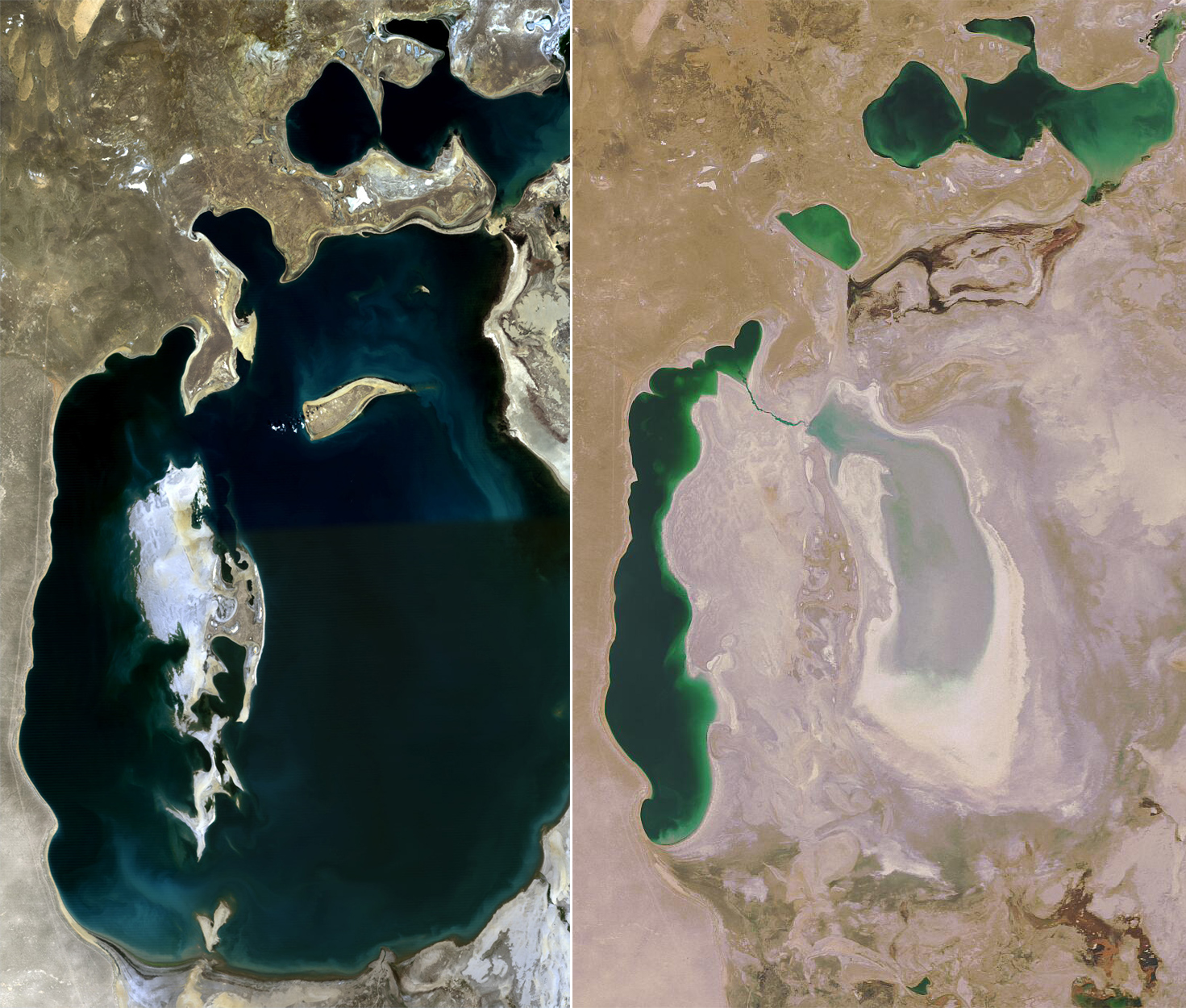
The shrinking Aral Sea, an example of poor water resource management diverted for irrigation

Environmental resource management or environmental management is the management of the interaction and impact of human societies on the environment. It is not, as the phrase might suggest, the management of the environment itself. Environmental resources management aims to ensure that ecosystem services are protected and maintained for future human generations, and also maintain ecosystem integrity through considering ethical, economic, and scientific (ecological) variables. Environmental resource management tries to identify factors between meeting needs and protecting resources. It is thus linked to environmental protection, resource management, sustainability, integrated landscape management, natural resource management, fisheries management, forest management, wildlife management, environmental management systems, and others.

== Significance ==
Environmental resource management is an issue of increasing concern, as reflected in its prevalence in several texts influencing global sociopolitical frameworks such as the Brundtland Commission's Our Common Future, which highlighted the integrated nature of the environment and international development, and the Worldwatch Institute's annual State of the World reports.

The environment determines the nature of people, animals, plants, and places around the Earth, affecting behaviour, religion, culture and economic practices.

== Scope ==
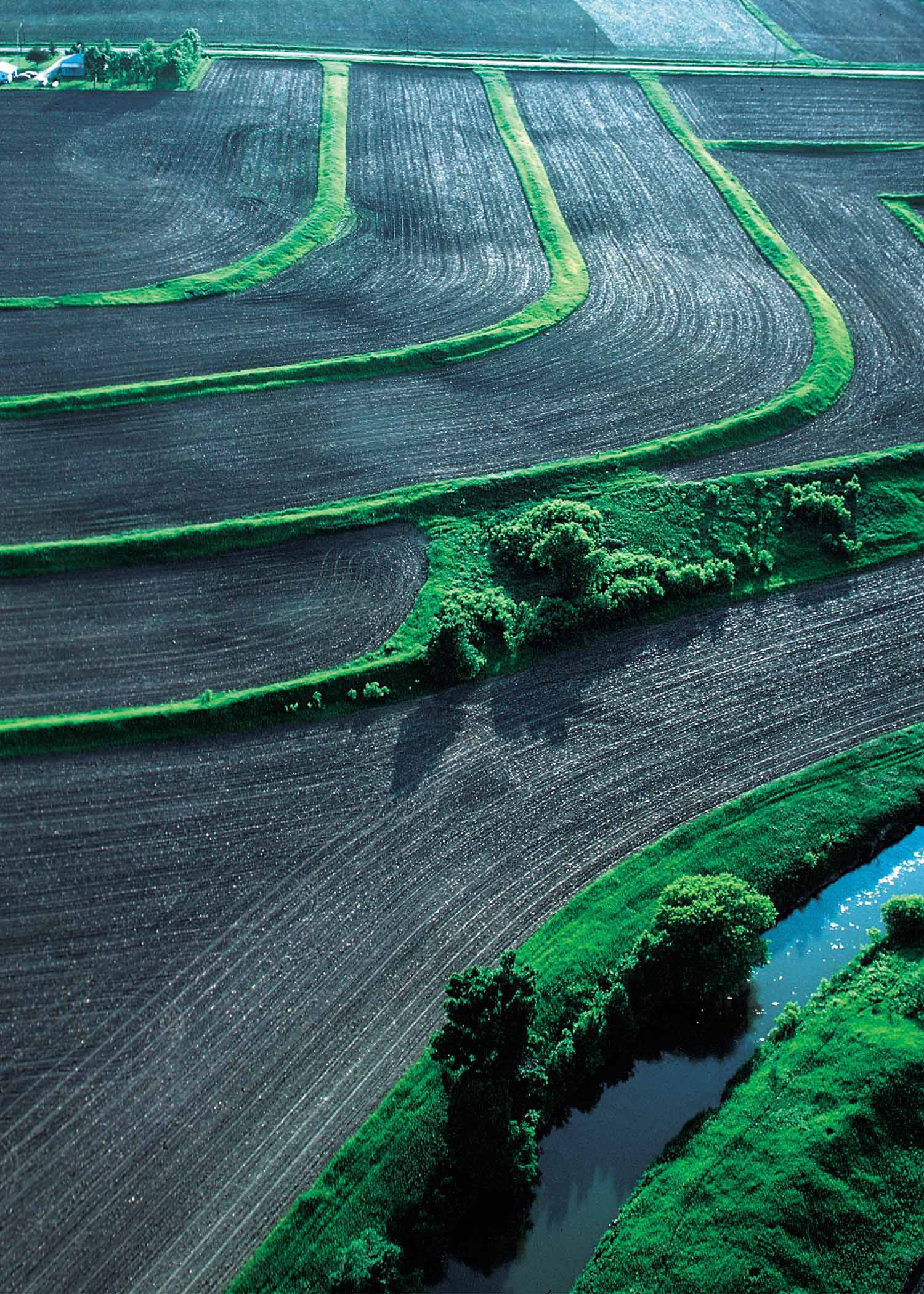
Improved agricultural practices such as these terraces in northwest Iowa can serve to preserve soil and improve water quality.

Environmental resource management can be viewed from a variety of perspectives. It involves the management of all components of the biophysical environment, both living (biotic) and non-living (abiotic), and the relationships among all living species and their habitats. The environment also involves the relationships of the human environment, such as the social, cultural, and economic environment, with the biophysical environment. The essential aspects of environmental resource management are ethical, economical, social, and technological. These underlie principles and help make decisions.

The concept of environmental determinism, probabilism, and possibilism are significant in the concept of environmental resource management.

Environmental resource management covers many areas in science, including geography, biology, social sciences, political sciences, public policy, ecology, physics, chemistry, sociology, psychology, and physiology. Environmental resource management as a practice and discourse (across these areas) is also the object of study in the social sciences.

== Aspects ==
=== Ethical ===
Environmental resource management strategies are intrinsically driven by conceptions of human-nature relationships. Ethical aspects involve the cultural and social issues relating to the environment, and dealing with changes to it. "All human activities take place in the context of certain types of relationships between society and the bio-physical world (the rest of nature)," and so, there is a great significance in understanding the ethical values of different groups around the world. Broadly speaking, two schools of thought exist in environmental ethics: Anthropocentrism and Ecocentrism, each influencing a broad spectrum of environmental resource management styles along a continuum. These styles perceive "...different evidence, imperatives, and problems, and prescribe different solutions, strategies, technologies, roles for economic sectors, culture, governments, and ethics, etc."

==== Anthropocentrism ====
Anthropocentrism, "an inclination to evaluate reality exclusively in terms of human values," is an ethic reflected in the major interpretations of Western religions and the dominant economic paradigms of the industrialised world. Anthropocentrism looks at nature as existing solely for the benefit of humans, and as a commodity to use for the good of humanity and to improve human quality of life. Anthropocentric environmental resource management is therefore not the conservation of the environment solely for the environment's sake, but rather the conservation of the environment, and ecosystem structure, for humans' sake.

==== Ecocentrism ====
Ecocentrists believe in the intrinsic value of nature while maintaining that human beings must use and even exploit nature to survive and live. It is this fine ethical line that ecocentrists navigate between fair use and abuse. At an extreme of the ethical scale, ecocentrism includes philosophies such as ecofeminism and deep ecology, which evolved as a reaction to dominant anthropocentric paradigms. "In its current form, it is an attempt to synthesize many old and some new philosophical attitudes about the relationship between nature and human activity, with particular emphasis on ethical, social, and spiritual aspects that have been downplayed in the dominant economic worldview."

=== Economics ===
Main article: Economics

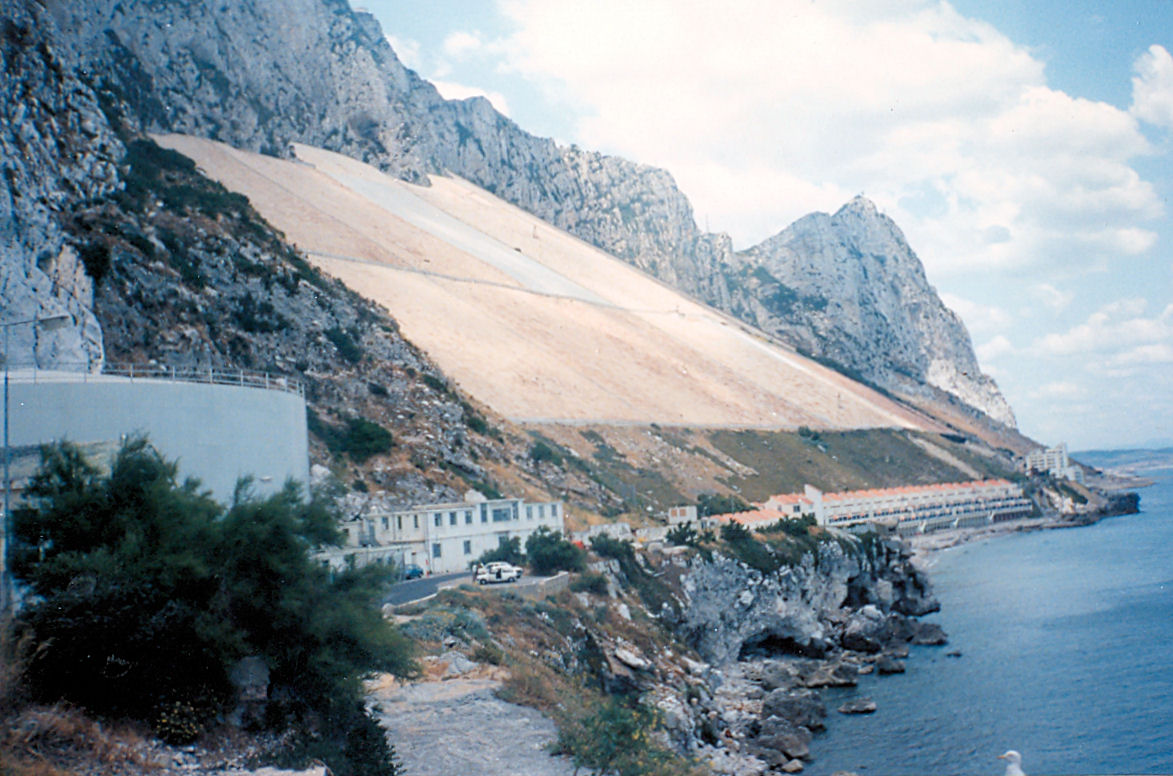
A water harvesting system collects rainwater from the Rock of Gibraltar into pipes that lead to tanks excavated inside the rock.

The economy functions within and is dependent upon goods and services provided by natural ecosystems. The role of the environment is recognized in both classical economics and neoclassical economics theories, yet the environment was a lower priority in economic policies from 1950 to 1980 due to emphasis from policy makers on economic growth. With the prevalence of environmental problems, many economists embraced the notion that, "If environmental sustainability must coexist for economic sustainability, then the overall system must [permit] identification of an equilibrium between the environment and the economy." As such, economic policy makers began to incorporate the functions of the natural environment – or natural capital – particularly as a sink for wastes and for the provision of raw materials and amenities.

Debate continues among economists as to how to account for natural capital, specifically whether resources can be replaced through knowledge and technology, or whether the environment is a closed system that cannot be replenished and is finite. Economic models influence environmental resource management, in that management policies reflect beliefs about natural capital scarcity. For someone who believes natural capital is infinite and easily substituted, environmental management is irrelevant to the economy. For example, economic paradigms based on neoclassical models of closed economic systems are primarily concerned with resource scarcity and thus prescribe legalizing the environment as an economic externality for an environmental resource management strategy. This approach has often been termed 'Command-and-control'. Colby has identified trends in the development of economic paradigms, among them, a shift towards more ecological economics since the 1990s.

=== Ecology ===
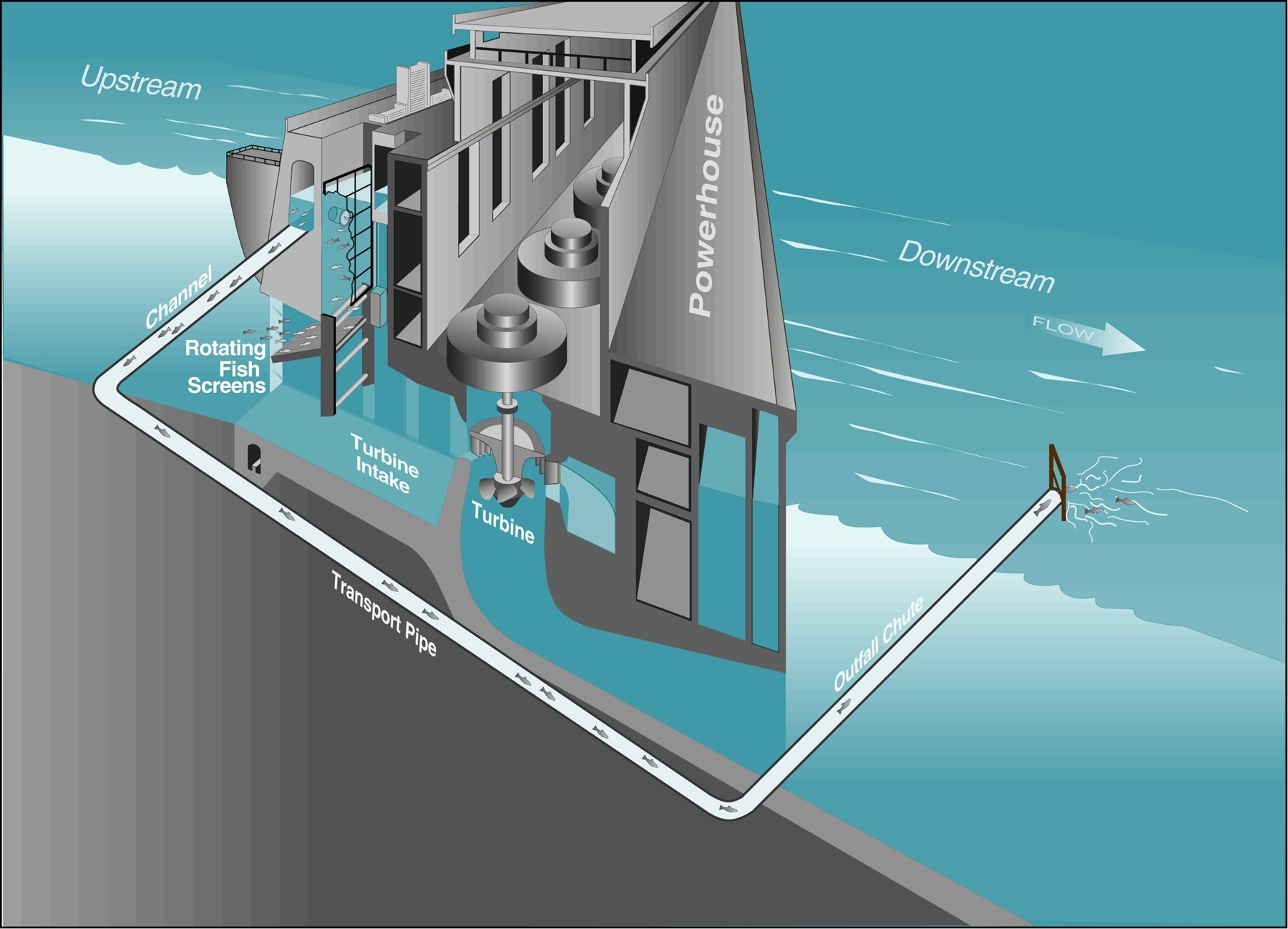
A diagram showing the juvenile fish bypass system, which allows young salmon and steelhead to safely pass the Rocky Reach Hydro Project in Washington

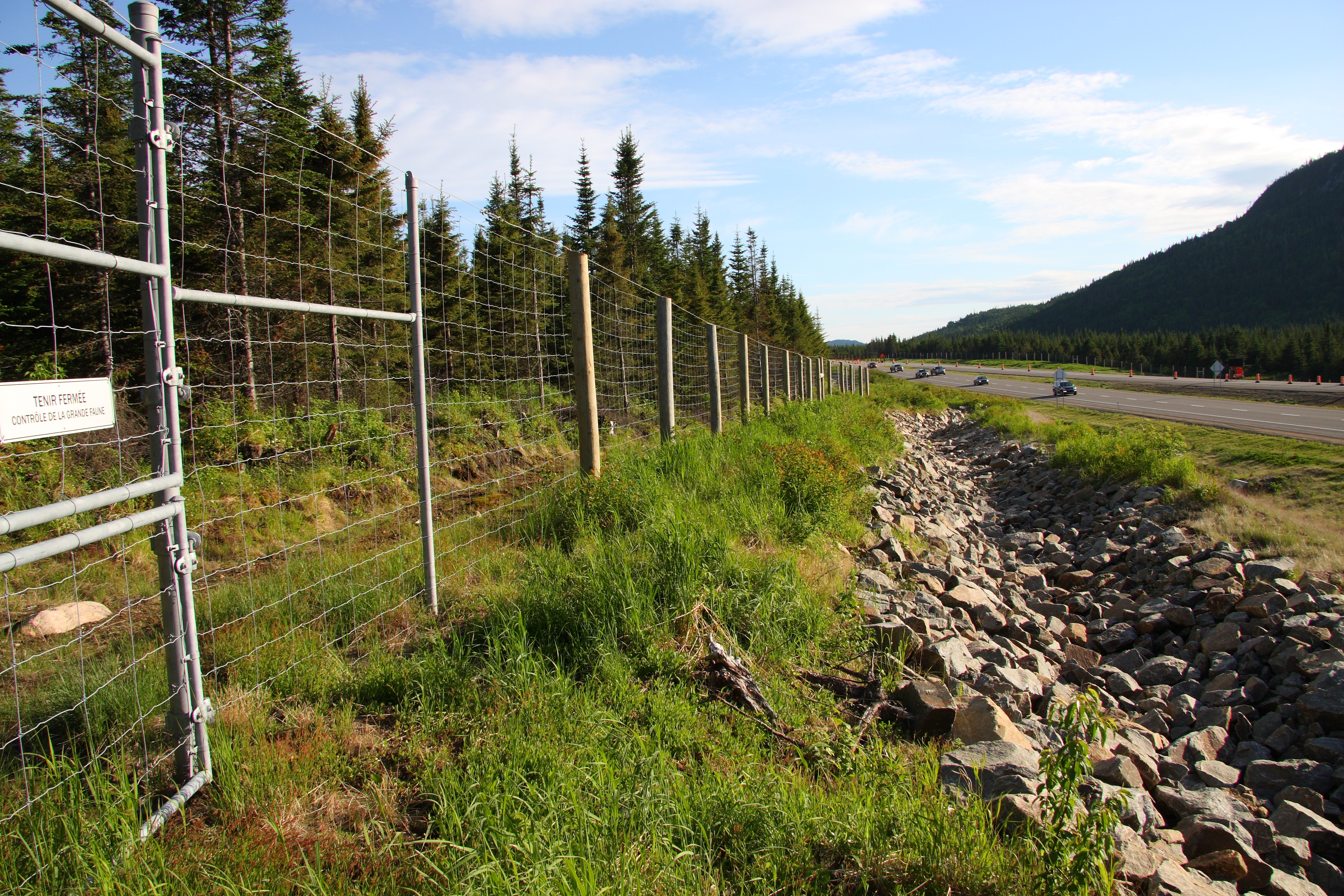
Fencing separates big game from vehicles along the Quebec Autoroute 73 in Canada.

There are many definitions of the field of science commonly called ecology. A typical one is "the branch of biology dealing with the relations and interactions between organisms and their environment, including other organisms." "The pairing of significant uncertainty about the behaviour and response of ecological systems with urgent calls for near-term action constitutes a difficult reality, and a common lament" for many environmental resource managers. Scientific analysis of the environment deals with several dimensions of ecological uncertainty. These include: structural uncertainty resulting from the misidentification, or lack of information pertaining to the relationships between ecological variables; parameter uncertainty referring to "uncertainty associated with parameter values that are not known precisely but can be assessed and reported in terms of the likelihood…of experiencing a defined range of outcomes"; and stochastic uncertainty stemming from chance or unrelated factors. Adaptive management is considered a useful framework for dealing with situations of high levels of uncertainty though it is not without its detractors.

A common scientific concept and impetus behind environmental resource management is carrying capacity. Simply put, carrying capacity refers to the maximum number of organisms a particular resource can sustain. The concept of carrying capacity, whilst understood by many cultures over history, has its roots in Malthusian theory. An example is visible in the EU Water Framework Directive. However, "it is argued that Western scientific knowledge ... is often insufficient to deal with the full complexity of the interplay of variables in environmental resource management. These concerns have been recently addressed by a shift in environmental resource management approaches to incorporate different knowledge systems including traditional knowledge, reflected in approaches such as adaptive co-management community-based natural resource management and transitions management among others.

== Sustainability ==
Sustainability in environmental resource management involves managing economic, social, and ecological systems both within and outside an organizational entity so it can sustain itself and the system it exists in. In context, sustainability implies that rather than competing for endless growth on a finite planet, development improves quality of life without necessarily consuming more resources. Sustainably managing environmental resources requires organizational change that instills sustainability values that portrays these values outwardly from all levels and reinforces them to surrounding stakeholders. The result should be a symbiotic relationship between the sustaining organization, community, and environment.

Many drivers compel environmental resource management to take sustainability issues into account. Today's economic paradigms generally prioritize profits over environmental damage. Ecologically, environmental degradation and climate change destabilize ecological systems that humanity depends on. An increasing gap between the global North–South divide denies access to human needs, rights, and education, leading to further environmental damage. The ecological condition stems from many anthropogenic sources. As a contributing factor to social and environmental change, the modern organisation could apply environmental resource management with sustainability principles to achieve effective outcomes. To achieve sustainable development with environmental resource management, an organisation should work within sustainability principles, including social and environmental accountability; long-term planning; a strong, shared vision; a holistic focus; devolved and consensus decision making; broad stakeholder engagement and justice; transparency measures; trust; and flexibility.

=== Current paradigm shifts ===
To adjust to today's environment of quick social and ecological changes, some organizations have begun to experiment with new tools and concepts. Those that are more traditional and stick to hierarchical decision making have difficulty dealing with the demand for lateral decision making that supports effective participation. Whether it be a matter of ethics or just strategic advantage organizations are internalizing sustainability principles. Some of the world's largest and most profitable corporations are shifting to sustainable environmental resource management: Ford, Toyota, BMW, Honda, Shell, Du Port, Sta toil, Swiss Re, Hewlett-Packard, and Unilever, among others. An extensive study by the Boston Consulting Group reaching 1,560 business leaders from diverse regions, job positions, expertise in sustainability, industries, and sizes of organizations, revealed the many benefits of sustainable practice as well as its viability.

Although the sustainability of environmental resource management has improved, corporate sustainability, for one, has yet to reach the majority of global companies operating in the markets. The three major barriers to preventing organizations from shifting towards sustainable practice with environmental resource management are not understanding what sustainability is; having difficulty modeling an economically viable case for the switch; and having a flawed execution plan, or a lack thereof. Therefore, the most important part of shifting an organization to adopt sustainability in environmental resource management would be to create a shared vision and understanding of what sustainability is for that particular organization and to clarify the business case.

== Stakeholders ==
=== Public sector ===
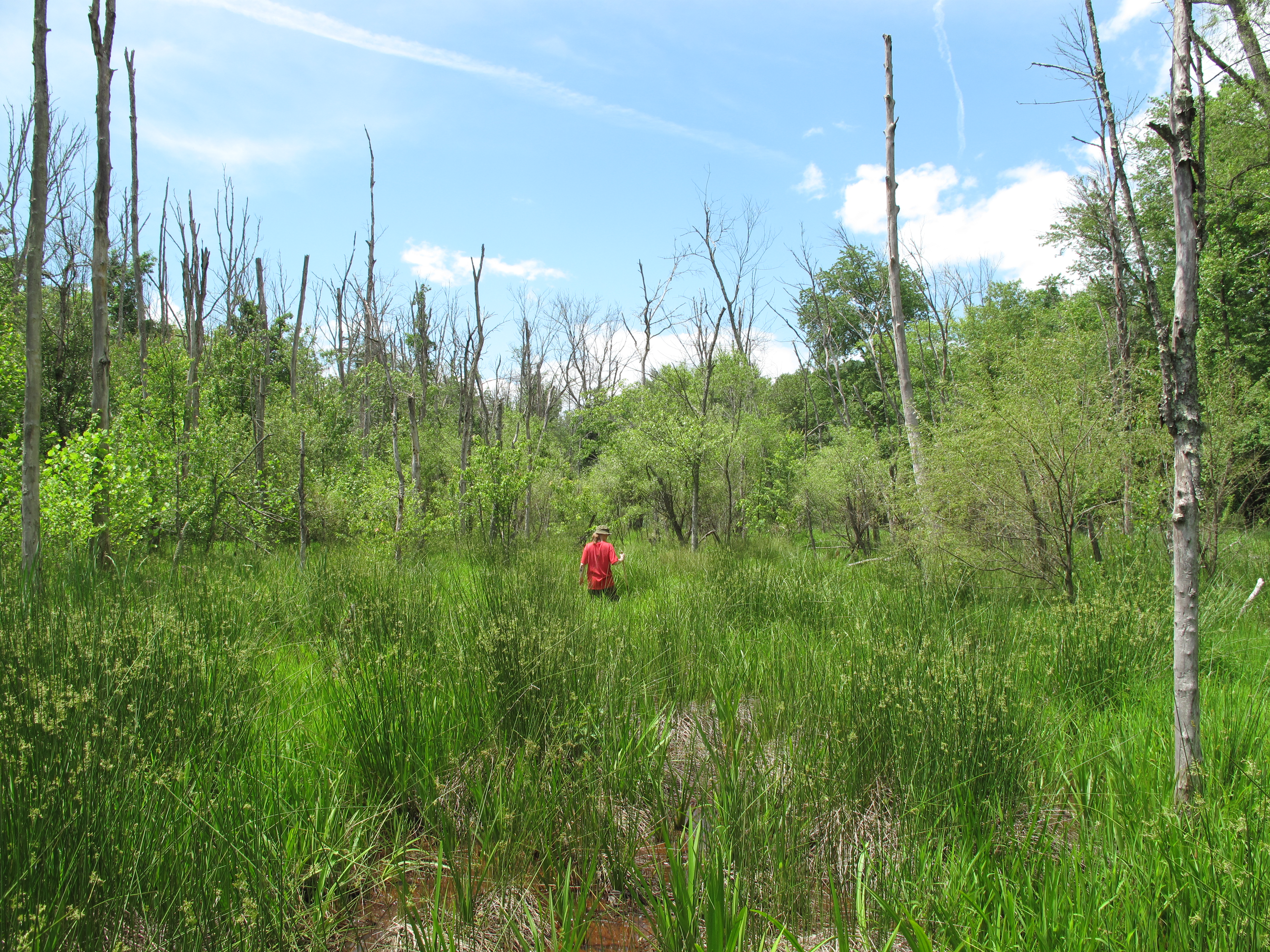
A conservation project in North Carolina involving the search for bog turtles was conducted by United States Fish and Wildlife Service and the North Carolina Wildlife Resources Commission and its volunteers.

The public sector comprises the general government sector plus all public corporations including the central bank. In environmental resource management the public sector is responsible for administering natural resource management and implementing environmental protection legislation. The traditional role of the public sector in environmental resource management is to provide professional judgement through skilled technicians on behalf of the public. With the increase of intractable environmental problems, the public sector has been led to examine alternative paradigms for managing environmental resources. This has resulted in the public sector working collaboratively with other sectors (including other governments, private and civil) to encourage sustainable natural resource management behaviours.

=== Private sector ===
The private sector comprises private corporations and non-profit institutions serving households. The private sector's traditional role in environmental resource management is that of the recovery of natural resources. Such private sector recovery groups include mining (minerals and petroleum), forestry and fishery organisations. Environmental resource management undertaken by the private sectors varies dependent upon the resource type, that being renewable or non-renewable and private and common resources (also see Tragedy of the Commons). Environmental managers from the private sector also need skills to manage collaboration within a dynamic social and political environment.

=== Civil society ===
Civil society comprises associations in which societies voluntarily organise themselves and which represent a wide range of interests and ties. These can include community-based organisations, indigenous peoples' organisations and non-government organisations (NGOs). Functioning through strong public pressure, civil society can exercise their legal rights against the implementation of resource management plans, particularly land management plans. The aim of civil society in environmental resource management is to be included in the decision-making process by means of public participation. Public participation can be an effective strategy to invoke a sense of social responsibility of natural resources.

== Tools ==
As with all management functions, effective management tools, standards, and systems are required. An environmental management standard or system or protocol attempts to reduce environmental impact as measured by some objective criteria. The ISO 14001 standard is the most widely used standard for environmental risk management and is closely aligned to the European Eco-Management and Audit Scheme (EMAS). As a common auditing standard, the ISO 19011 standard explains how to combine this with quality management.

Other environmental management systems (EMS) tend to be based on the ISO 14001 standard and many extend it in various ways:

- The Green Dragon Environmental Management Standard is a five-level EMS designed for smaller organisations for whom ISO 14001 may be too onerous and for larger organisations who wish to implement ISO 14001 in a more manageable step-by-step approach,
- BS 8555 is a phased standard that can help smaller companies move to ISO 14001 in six manageable steps,
- The Natural Step focuses on basic sustainability criteria and helps focus engineering on reducing use of materials or energy use that is unsustainable in the long term,
- Natural Capitalism advises using accounting reform and a general biomimicry and industrial ecology approach to do the same thing,
- US Environmental Protection Agency has many further terms and standards that it defines as appropriate to large-scale EMS,
- The UN and World Bank has encouraged adopting a "natural capital" measurement and management framework.

Other strategies exist that rely on making simple distinctions rather than building top-down management "systems" using performance audits and full cost accounting. For instance, Ecological Intelligent Design divides products into consumables, service products or durables and unsaleables – toxic products that no one should buy, or in many cases, do not realize they are buying. By eliminating the unsaleables from the comprehensive outcome of any purchase, better environmental resource management is achieved without systems.

Another example that diverges from top-down management is the implementation of community based co-management systems of governance. An example of this is community based subsistence fishing areas, such as is implemented in Ha'ena, Hawaii. Community based systems of governance allow for the communities who most directly interact with the resource and who are most deeply impacted by the overexploitation of said resource to make the decisions regarding its management, thus empowering local communities and more effectively managing resources.

Recent successful cases have put forward the notion of integrated management. It shares a wider approach and stresses out the importance of interdisciplinary assessment. It is an interesting notion that might not be adaptable to all cases.

=== Case Study: Kissidougou, Guinea (Fairhead, Leach) ===
Kissidougou, Guinea's dry season brings about fires in the open grass fires which defoliate the few trees in the savanna. There are villages within this savanna surrounded by "islands" of forests, allowing for forts, hiding, rituals, protection from wind and fire, and shade for crops. According to scholars and researchers in the region during the late-19th and 20th centuries, there was a steady decline in tree cover. This led to colonial Guinea's implementation of policies, including the switch of upland to swamp farming; bush-fire control; protection of certain species and land; and tree planting in villages. These policies were carried out in the form of permits, fines, and military repression.

But, Kissidougou villagers claim their ancestors' established these islands. Many maps and letters evidence France's occupation of Guinea, as well as Kissidougou's past landscape. During the 1780s to 1860s "the whole country [was] prairie." James Fairhead and Melissa Leach, both environmental anthropologists at the University of Sussex, claim the state's environmental analyses "casts into question the relationships between society, demography, and environment." With this, they reformed the state's narratives: Local land use can be both vegetation enriching and degrading; combined effect on resource management is greater than the sum of their parts; there is evidence of increased population correlating to an increase in forest cover. Fairhead and Leach support the enabling of policy and socioeconomic conditions in which local resource management conglomerates can act effectively. In Kissidougou, there is evidence that local powers and community efforts shaped the island forests that shape the savanna's landscape.

== See also ==
- Citizen science, cleanup projects that people can take part in.
- Cleaner production
- Environmental impact assessment
- Environmental management scheme
- Environmental manager
- Integrated landscape management
- ISO 14000
- Natural resource management
- Planetary management
- Political ecology
- Resource justice
- Stakeholder analysis
- Sustainable management
