= World Cities Day =

United Nations observance day

World Cities Day is an annual United Nations observance day held on 31 October. The global observance, first held in 2014, is organized by the United Nations Human Settlements Programme (UN-Habitat) in coordination with each year's selected host city.

== History ==
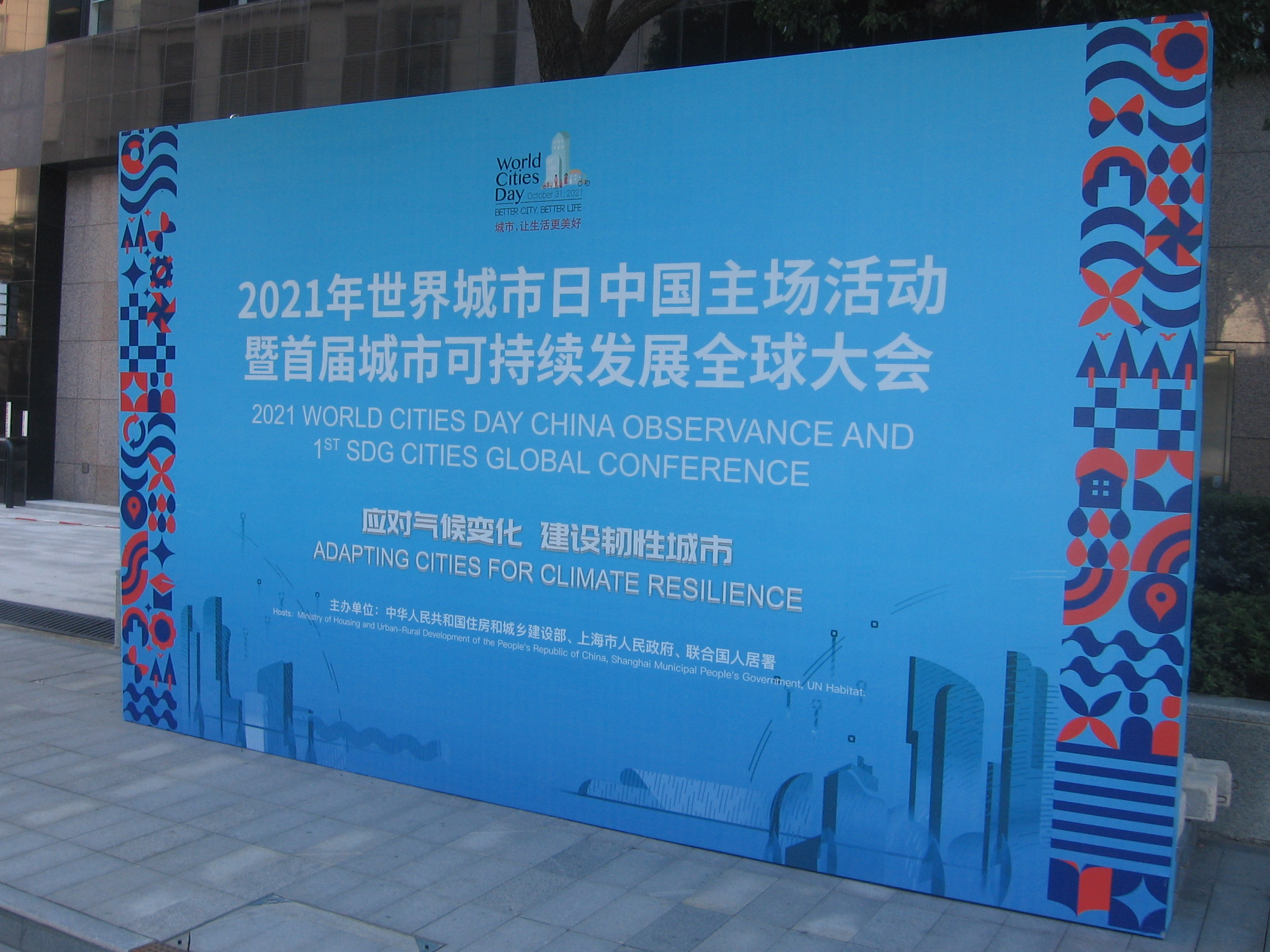
2021 World Cities Day China Observance in Shanghai

World Cities Day was established on 27 December 2013 by the United Nations General Assembly in its resolution A/RES/68/239, in which the General Assembly "decides to designate 31 October, beginning in 2014, as World Cities Day, invites States, the United Nations system, in particular UN-Habitat, relevant international organizations, civil society and all relevant stakeholders to observe and raise awareness of the Day". The first World Cities Day was held in October 2014.

A legacy of Expo 2010 Shanghai China, World Cities Day aims to promote the international community's interest in global urbanization, push forward cooperation among countries in meeting opportunities and addressing challenges of urbanization, and contributing to sustainable urban development around the world. The observance day ties in with Sustainable Development Goal 11, to make cities "inclusive, safe, resilient and sustainable".

The general theme of World Cities Day is Better City, Better Life, while each year a different sub-theme and a location for its global observance is selected, to either promote successes of urbanization, or address specific challenges resulting from urbanization.

== Previous World Cities Days ==
Year	Sub-Theme	Venue	Host
2026	Regenerating the City: Adequate Housing for All		
2025	People-centred smart cities	Bogotá, Colombia	Carlos Fernando Galán, Mayor of Bogotá
2024	Youth leading climate and local action for cities	Alexandria, Egypt	H.E. Dr. Mostafa Madbouly, Prime Minister of the Arab Republic of Egypt
2023	Financing sustainable urban future for all	Üsküdar, Turkey	Hilmi Türkmen, Mayor of Üsküdar
2022	Act Local to Go Global	Shanghai, China	Ni Hong, Minister of Housing and Urban-Rural Development of China
2021	Adapting Cities for Climate Resilience	Luxor, Arab Republic of Egypt	H.E. Dr. Mostafa Madbouly, Prime Minister of the Arab Republic of Egypt
2020	Valuing our communities and cities	Nakuru, Kenya	James Wainaina Macharia, representing the Government of the Republic of Kenya, Cabinet Secretary, Ministry of Transport, Infrastructure, Housing, Urban Development and Public Works
2019	Changing the world: innovations and better life for future generations	Yekaterinburg, Russia	Aleksandr Vysokinskiy, Mayor of Ekaterinburg
2018	Building Sustainable and Resilient Cities	Liverpool, United Kingdom	Joe Anderson, Mayor of Liverpool
2017	Innovative Governance, Open Cities	Guangzhou, China	Wang Menghui, Minister of Housing and Urban-Rural Development of China
2016	Inclusive Cities, Shared Development	Quito, Ecuador	Mauricio Rodas Espinel, Mayor of Quito
2015	Designed to live together	Milan, Italy	Giuliano Pisapia, Mayor of Milan
2014	Leading Urban Transformations	Shanghai, China	Chen Zhenggao, former Minister of Housing and Urban-Rural Development
