= Alexander Hamilton-Gordon =

Alexander Hamilton-Gordon may refer to:

- Alexander Hamilton-Gordon (British Army officer, born 1817) (died 1890), soldier and MP
- Alexander Hamilton-Gordon (British Army officer, born 1859) (died 1939), soldier, son of the above

== See also ==
- Alexander Hamilton (disambiguation)
- Alexander Gordon (disambiguation)
