= Indianapolis Impalas =

US rugby union club, based in Indianapolis

Indianapolis Impalas (Indianapolis RFC)
- Full name: Indianapolis Rugby Football Club
- Unions: USA Rugby; Midwest Rugby Football Union; Indiana Rugby Union
- Founded: 1980
- Location: Indianapolis, Indiana, United States
- Ground: Indianapolis World Sports Park
- President: Evan Roberts
- Coach(es): Michael Temple, Evan Roberts, Chasz Banks
Team kit	2nd kit

Official website
- www.indianapolisrugbyclub.com

The Indianapolis Impalas (Indianapolis Rugby Football Club) are an American rugby union club founded in 1980. The Impalas are members of USA Rugby, and currently compete in Division 1 of the Midwest Rugby Football Union.

The Impalas advanced to the Final 16 of the National Championships in 2004. In 2008–09 the Impalas claimed 3rd overall in the National Championships for Division 2; as a result of this success, the club moved up to Division 1. In addition to the move, the club also formed a Division 3 team to debut in the 2009–10 season.

== Club honors ==
- 2004 DII Men's Club National Championship – 4th place
- 2007–08 Southern League Division Champions of the Midwest DII Eastern Conference
- 2008–09 Southern League Division Champions of the Midwest DII Eastern Conference
- 2008–09 Midwest DII Eastern Conference champions
- 2008–09 Midwest DII co-champions
- 2009 DII Men's Club National Championship – 3rd place
- 2019 Midwest Rugby Football Union DIV champions
- 2020 Midwest Rugby Football Union DIV runner up
- 2023 Midwest Rugby Football Union DII champions
- 2024 USA Rugby Northern Super Regional DII champions

== See also ==
- Rugby Union in the United States
- Sports in Indianapolis
