= Wisconsin Rugby Club =

(United States) Wisconsin Rugby Club
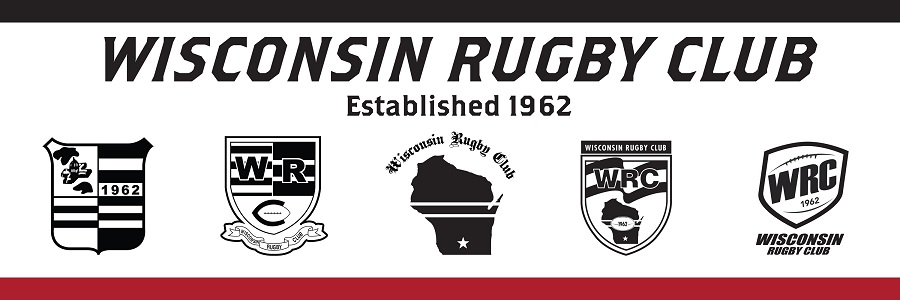
- Full name: Wisconsin Rugby Club
- Union: USA Rugby
- Nickname(s): Wisconsin, WRC
- Founded: 1962
- Ground: Wisconsin Rugby Sports Complex (Capacity: 130)
- Coach(es): (United States) Adam Thimmig (United States) Alex Hanhart
- League(s): Division 2 Division 3
1st kit	2nd kit

Official website
- www.wisconsinrugby.com

The Wisconsin Rugby Club (WRC) is a USA Rugby Men's Rugby Union club with sides competing in Division 2 and Division 3. WRC is based in Madison, Wisconsin, United States. Wisconsin is the 2013 & 1998 USA Rugby Division 2 National Champions, 2015 & 2012 USA Rugby Division 2 National Runners-up, and 2008 3rd Place finisher.

== History ==
The Wisconsin Rugby Club was founded in 1962 in Madison, Wisconsin. The WRC is an amateur Rugby Club that competes as a member of the Wisconsin Rugby Football Union, Midwest Rugby Football Union and USA Rugby.

WRC finished in 4th Place overall in the 1997 Division 2 National Championships.

WRC defeated Frederick 16-8 to win the 1998 Division 2 National Championship.

WRC defeated Detroit 24-16 to finish 3rd in the Nation in 2008.

WRC defeated San Diego Old Aztecs 25-21 on the last play of the game to advance to the 2012 D2 National Championship.

WRC finished as 2012 Division 2 National Champion Runners-up losing to Rocky Gorge (Maryland).

WRC Won the 2013 Division 2 National Championship over Wilmington Rugby Club (Wilmington, DE).

== Club Grounds ==
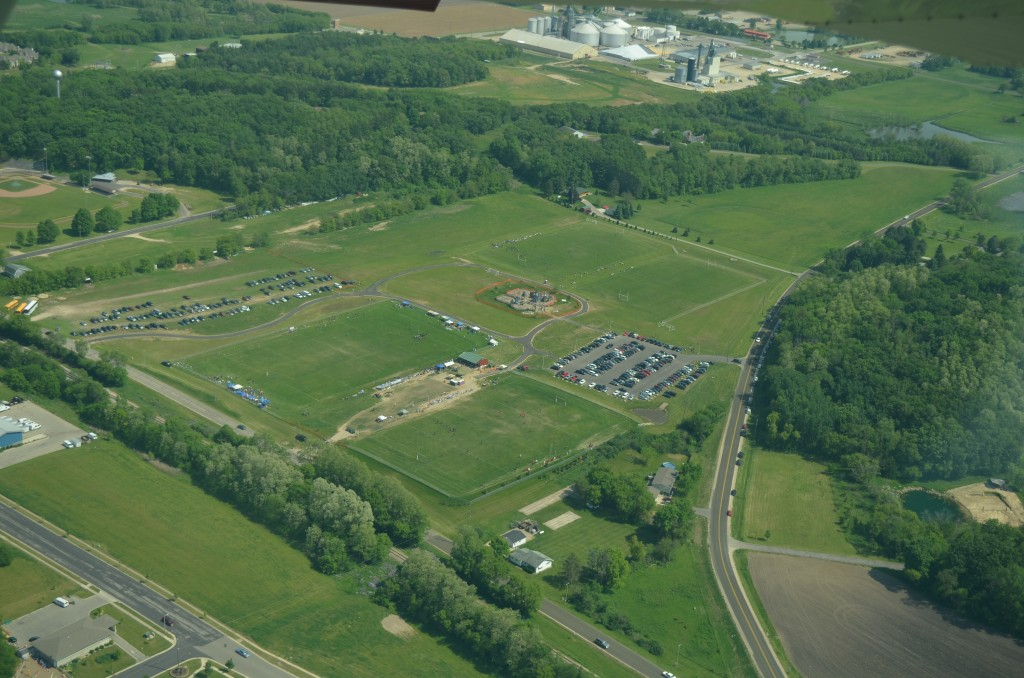
Wisconsin Rugby Sports Complex

The Wisconsin Rugby Club plays home matches at the Wisconsin Rugby Sports Complex in Cottage Grove, Wisconsin.

The Wisconsin Rugby Sports Complex began operating in Fall 2010 following two years of construction. It contains two full-size Rugby Fields, bleacher seating for 700 and 1000 sq ft Picnic Shelter. Future expansion plans call for a 15,000 sq ft two-story clubhouse.

== High school ==
In an effort to promote rugby in the Madison Area, the WRC have created various high school teams. These high school programs are run and staffed by current and former Wisconsin Rugby Club members. The current list of WRC high school rugby programs include:

- Madison La Follette
- Madison Westside
- Middleton
- Oregon High School
