= Alexander Snow Gordon =

American silversmith

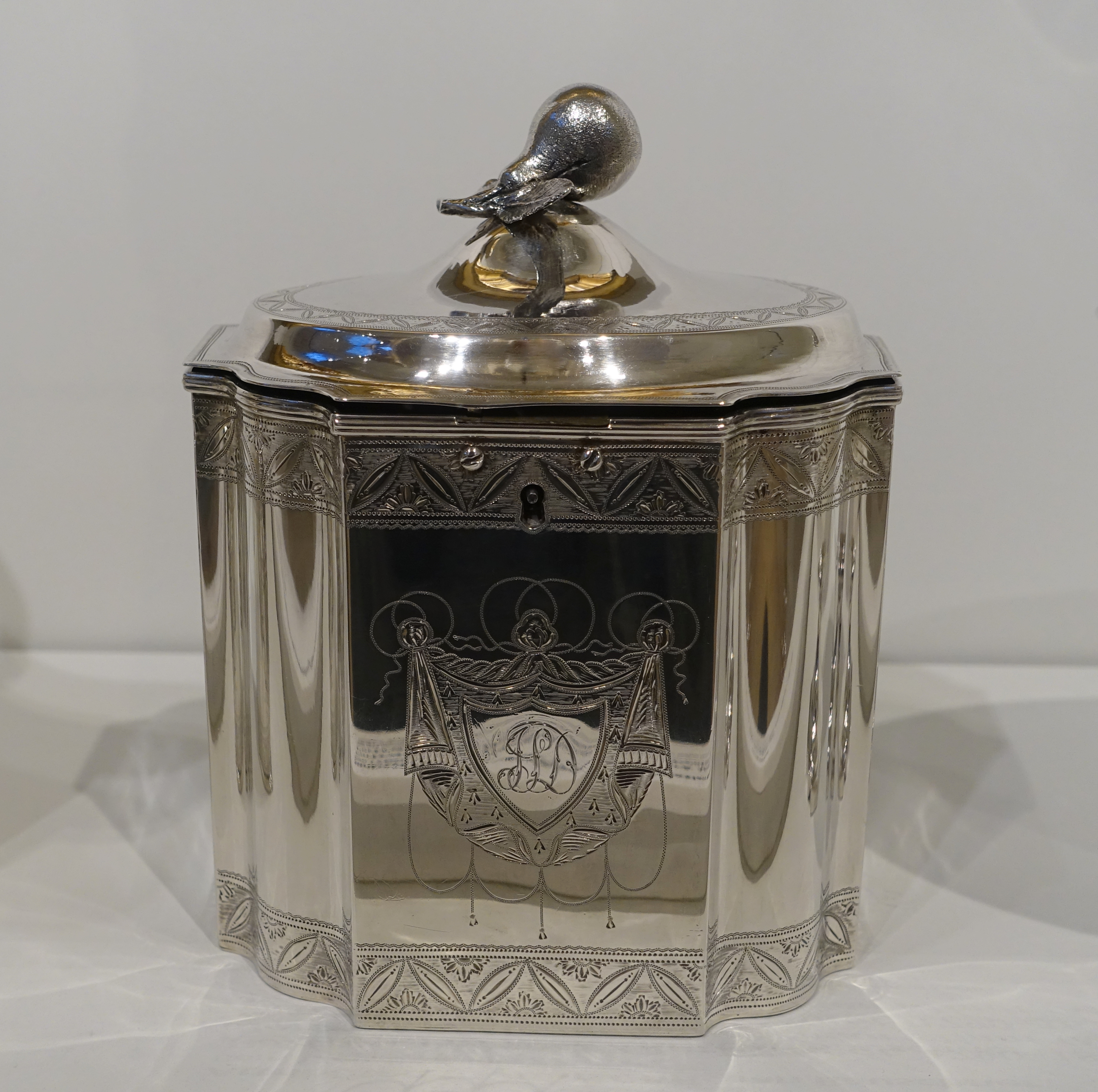
Tea caddy by Alexander Snow Gordon, c. 1795, in the Peabody Essex Museum

Alexander Snow Gordon (died 1803) was an American silversmith and inn-keeper, active in New York City. Little is known of his life, aside from the fact that he started business in 1795 at 40 William Street in New York City. He was a founding member and first master (1801, 1802) of the Washington Lodge of Free and Accepted Masons.
