= Canadian Institute of Public Health Inspectors =

Canadian professional association

The Canadian Institute of Public Health Inspectors (CIPHI) is the national professional association that represents environmental public health professionals (EPHPs) in Canada. CIPHI has a national executive council and eight regional branches. The organization is managed and operated entirely by volunteer members.
