= American Academy of Sanitarians =

- Abbreviation: AAS
- Formation: 1966
- Founded at: Indiana
- Type: Professional Association
- Legal status: 501(c)(3)
- Purpose: Protecting environmental health
- Region served: United States
- Website: https://www.sanitarians.org

The American Academy of Sanitarians (AAS) is a network of environmental health professionals providing recognition of outstanding competence of professional practice in the field of environmental health. The four-part mission of the academy, includes: elevating the standards, improving the practice, advancing the professional proficiency, and promoting the highest levels of ethical conduct among professional sanitarians in every field of environmental health. Through a process of evaluation by peers, the academy recognizes Diplomates, who are qualified persons attaining high professional stature through leadership and accomplishment in the practice of environmental health.

== Recognition ==
Certification as a Diplomate of the American Academy of Sanitarians (DAAS) may be awarded to professionally credentialed environmental health practitioners with qualities of outstanding competence and leadership, which are assessed through a formal process of evaluation by peers.

In 1999, the academy created the certification of Diplomate Laureate of the American Academy of Sanitarians (DLAAS) to recognize Diplomates who have demonstrated continuing outstanding commitment, leadership, and accomplishment in the environmental health profession beyond the criteria used to evaluate Diplomates.
