= Minnesota Rugby Football Union =

The Minnesota Rugby Football Union (MNRFU) is the Local Area Union (LAU) for Rugby Union teams in the state of Minnesota. The MNRFU is part of the Midwest Rugby Football Union (MRFU), one of the seven Territorial Area Unions (TAU's) that comprise USA Rugby.

== Men's clubs ==
=== Division I ===
Metropolis RFC

=== Division II ===
Eastside Banshees Rugby Football Club

Metropolis Killer B's

St. Paul Rugby Football Club

=== Division IV ===
Eastside Banshees Rugby Football Club

Faribault Boksprings

Minneapolis Mayhem

St. Cloud Bottom Feeders

St. Paul Rugby Football Club

Rochester Minnesota Rugby

Twin Ports Ice Monkeys

== Women's clubs ==
=== Division I ===
Minnesota Valkyries

Twin Cities Amazon Rugby Club

=== Division II ===
- Minneapolis Menagerie Rugby Club
- St. Cloud Sirens Rugby Club

== Collegiate clubs ==
Minnesota Collegiate Rugby consists of teams playing in the Division I-A (Big 10), Great Midwest Rugby Conference, and the Northern Lights Collegiate Rugby Conference - which consists of teams competing in USA Rugby Division 2 and the National Small College Rugby Organization (NSCRO).

=== Men's collegiate clubs ===
Division I-A

- University of Minnesota (Big 10)

Great Midwest Rugby Conference

- University of Minnesota Duluth (Division 2)

Northern Lights Conference Tier 1

- Minnesota State University, Mankato (Division 2)
- North Dakota State University (Division 2)
- St. Cloud State University (Division 2)
- University of North Dakota (Division 2)
- Winona State University (Division 2)
- Minnesota State University Moorhead (Division 2)
- St. Cloud State University (Division 2)
- University of St. Thomas (NSCRO)
- St. Johns University (NSCRO)

Northern Lights Conference Tier 2 (NSCRO)

- Bemidji State University
- Carleton College
- Gustavus Adolphus College
- Macalester College
- Southwest Minnesota State University
- St. Olaf College
- University of Minnesota Morris
- The College of St. Scholastica

=== Women's collegiate clubs ===
Division I-A

- University of Minnesota (Big 10)

Northern Lights Conference Tier 1

- Winona State University (Division 2)
- Minnesota State University, Mankato (Division 2)
- St. Cloud State University (Division 2)
- North Dakota State University (Division 2)
- University of Minnesota Duluth (Division 2)
- University of North Dakota (Division 2)
- Minnesota State University Moorhead (NSCRO)

Northern Lights Conference Tier 2 (NSCRO)

- College of St. Benedict
- Gustavus Adolphus College
- Bemidji State University
- Carleton College
- St. Olaf College
- Macalester College
- The College of St. Scholastica
