= Chief green officer =

A Chief green officer (CGO), or Chief environmental commitment officer (CECO), is a corporate officer responsible for implementing and managing the corporation's commitment to reducing its carbon footprint and protecting the environment. Typically, these functions are performed within the facility management group who has responsibilities for providing the basic resources necessary for the business operations. Defining a corporate officer reinforces the facility management efforts historically performed to reduce the corporation's costs of ownership and operations.

The CGO is the highest-ranking corporate administrator of the organization's eco-friendly programs, initiatives, and education, and shares the responsibility with the CEO and COO for the Direction of Research and Development of new technologies

== See also ==
- Chartered Environmentalist
- Chief sustainability officer
- Council-certified Indoor Air Quality Manager (CIAQM)
- Environmental health officer (EHO)
- Sustainable business
- Triple bottom line
