= Environmental manager =

Environmental managers are involved in processes that seek to control some environmental entities in orientation to a plan or idea. Whether such control is possible, however, is contested. Examples for environmental managers range from corporate agents (corporate environmental managers) via managers of a nature reserve, to environmental and resource planning agents but, analytically seen, also involve indigenous environmental managers, farmers or environmental activists. In many accounts, hope is held that environmental managers implement grand plans or political programmes. At the heart of the notion of environmental managers is, thus, a pragmatic and rational actor who optimises environments in orientation to some aim. Critical academics point out that the very idea that such managers exist and are imagined as capable of managing may well be flawed.

== Corporate environmental managers ==
Steve Fineman studied UK managers and their "'green' selves and roles" in the last decade, suggesting that while environmental problems may be recognised by them, production is seen as legitimising pollution. Optimistic accounts see managers as stewards of environmental ethics. Literature differentiates different styles by managers to engage with the environment.

== State environmental managers ==
State institutions can manage directly environments through their staff. And state institutions can use civil agents on their behalf. Examples for the latter are farmers who are to implement environmental regulation, citizens subject to e.g. recycling legislation or independent auditors who use laws as standards. Military agents can also act as environmental managers insofar as their action constitutes planned intervention in some environment (e.g. the burning of a forest, the destruction of streets or managing an open landscape for military training), trying to achieve military aims.

== Scientists as environmental managers ==
A variety of scientists are involved directly in environmental management. Cases of ecologists acting as managers of ecosystems are known.

== Study of environmental managers ==
The very notion that humans may be able to manage environments is criticised for being top-down, anthropocentric and short-sighted.

== See also ==
- Environmental activist
- Chief sustainability officer
- Rational planning model
