= Organizational stakeholders =

Concept in management

Organizational stakeholders are the stakeholders that allow an organization to exist and include shareholders, owners, employees, customers and the wider community. They were known as economic actors in economics theory and the concept became prominent in the 1980s.

== History ==
In the 1980s, a change in companies organizational culture began when internal and external actors started to demand more from the companies from whom they acquired goods and services. Actors wanted companies to reflect their core values, or the values that were established the moment when the organization was created; these values also need to reflect the company's organizational culture. These actors were later on given the name of stakeholders, people or groups who have an interest, claim, or stake in the organization. To be more specific, they focus on what a company does and how well it performs. As companies began to maximize their profits, stakeholders became more demanding and influential in the decision-making process. These groups of stakeholders began insisting on a more dynamic, stimulating, and rewarding work environment that would result in better work conditions.

== Composition of stakeholders and their contributions ==
Stakeholders	Contribution to the Organisation
Shareholders	Money and Capital
Managers	Skills and Expertise
Employees	Skills and Expertise
Customers	Revenue from purchase of goods and services
Suppliers	High-quality inputs
Unions	Free and fair collective bargaining
Government	Rules governing good business practice
Pressure Groups	Social and economic infrastructure
General Public	Customer loyalty and reputation

== Internal stakeholders ==
Stakeholders can be divided into two main categories: Internal Stakeholders and External Stakeholders.

Internal stakeholders can be considered the first line of action when it comes to implementing decisions in a company, due to the fact that they have direct influence on its organizational resources. The classification of internal stakeholders can be divided into three categories: shareholders, managerial employees, and employees. Shareholders typically believe that they are the ones with the most power when it comes to influencing decision making because they own a part of the company, however, managerial and nonmanagerial employees should be given the same amount of credit because they are the ones in charge of applying the different politics that have been established at a managerial level to assure the success of company. While managers transmit the organizations goals, the nonmanagers are in charge of putting these goals into practice. The success of a company occurs when these three categories are given the same importance, and therefore, become synchronized to achieve the same goals.

== External stakeholders ==
External stakeholders are people who neither own a part of the organization nor employed by it, but do have some interest in it or its activities. While internal stakeholders are divided specifically into three categories, external stakeholders are made up of a more broad set of actors. These actors can be: customers, suppliers, unions, the government, pressure groups, and the general public can all be considered external stakeholders. The demands put forth by these actors motivate the organization to accomplish their values and goals that were established when the organization was created. On the other hand, the external stakeholders can evaluate the effectiveness of the organization depending on whether or not they satisfy the interests of these actors. If external stakeholders feel that the company is not handling the issues that they have presented, they have the capacity to indirectly influence the market where the company develops its business, leading to a decrease in the profit of that organization until they have addressed this issue.

== Satisfaction of organizational stakeholders ==
It is clear that the groups that make up organizational stakeholders have their own interests that need to be satisfied, these being either internal or external stakeholders. These interests can vary from financial, technological, or at times can even turn into ethical demands. Therefore, an organization, whether big or small, must first find a way to define, fully understand and address these interests that stakeholders are demanding to be taken care of. This is a very delicate process that needs to be addressed with discretion, due to the fact that this can identify the long-term success of an organization or the failure of the same, "an organisation that does not have the ability to satisfy its stakeholders defeats the purpose of its existence".

== See also ==
- Stakeholder
- Organizational culture
- Strategic planning
