= Allegheny Rugby Union =

Rugby organization if Pittsburgh, Pennsylvania, U.S.

- Sport: Rugby union
- Founded: 1975
- President: Dan Houlihan

The Allegheny Rugby Union is a non-profit corporation whose objective is to promote, serve, and manage the game of rugby union in the greater Pittsburgh area. The Allegheny area is the region described as Western Pennsylvania, Western New York, Northern West Virginia and Eastern Ohio bordering Pennsylvania in the United States of America. The Allegheny Rugby Union is a member of the Midwest Rugby Football Union (MRFU) and USA Rugby.

== Senior Club ==
=== Men's Club ===
Senior Division I

- Pittsburgh Forge RFC

Senior Division II

- South Pittsburgh Hooligans Rugby Club

Senior Division III

- Greensburg Maulers RFC
- Pittsburgh Forge RFC
- Presque Isle Scalawags RFC (Erie, PA)

Senior Division IV

- South Pittsburgh Hooligans Rugby Club

=== Women's Club ===
Senior Division I/II

- Buffalo WRFC
- North Buffalo WRFC
- Pittsburgh Forge WRFC
- South Buffalo WRFC

== Men's College ==
Following the bankruptcy of USA Rugby in the spring of 2020, and the rebranding of the National Small College Rugby Organization (NSCRO) as National Collegiate Rugby (NCR), the Allegheny Rugby Union undertook a massive expansion returning Men's collegiate rugby to the conference. In spring 2020, the ARU announced the re-launch of its D1/D2 Men's Collegiate Conference. Shortly after that it announced a new Small College Conference under the auspices of the ARU. The creation of a small college conference greatly expanded the reach of the Union as it added teams from as far west as Indiana, Kentucky, and Michigan, outside the traditional footprint of the ARU.

Currently it has five members in the D1/D2 conference and 26 members in the small college conference. The first full season of competitive play for both conferences began in fall 2021.

Men's College Division I/II

- Alderson Broaddus University
- Kent State University
- Indiana University of Pennsylvania
- West Virginia University
- Wheeling University

Men's Small College Conference

- Akron University
- Ashland University
- Baldwin Wallace University
- Bellarmine University
- California University of Pennsylvania
- Case Western Reserve University
- Cedarville University
- Clarion University of Pennsylvania
- Denison University
- Earlham College
- Franciscan University of Steubenville
- Frostburg State University
- Gannon University
- Hillsdale University
- John Carroll University
- Kenyon College
- Malone University
- Oberlin College
- Ohio Northern University
- Ohio Wesleyan University
- Rio Grande University (OH)
- Robert Morris University
- Slippery Rock University of Pennsylvania
- Taylor University
- Tiffin University
- Wabash College
- Wittenberg University

== Women's College ==
Women's College Division II

- Indiana University of Pennsylvania WRFC
- Kent State University WRFC
- Notre Dame College WRFC
- University of Pittsburgh WRFC
- West Virginia University WRFC
- Youngstown State University WRFC

Women's College NSCRO

- California University of Pennsylvania WRFC
- Clarion University WRFC
- Fairmont State University WRFC
- Gannon University WRFC
- Robert Morris University WRFC
- St. Vincent's College WRFC
