= Midwest Rugby Football Union =

The Midwest Rugby Football Union (MRFU) is a Territorial Union (TU) for rugby union teams playing in the Midwestern United States. It is one of seven TUs that governed a specific region of USA Rugby. It was founded in 1964.

In 2013, USA Rugby reorganized from Territorial Unions (TU's) to Geographical Unions (GU's).

== Local Area Unions (LAU's) ==
- Allegheny Rugby Union official site
- Chicago Area Rugby Football Union (CARFU) new official site
- Indiana Rugby Football Union official site
- Iowa Rugby Union official site
- Michigan Rugby Football Union official site
- Minnesota Rugby Football Union (MNRFU) official site
- Ohio Rugby Union official site
- Wisconsin Rugby Football Union (WRFU) official site

== See also ==
- USA Rugby
- Indiana High School Rugby
