= USA Club Rugby XVs =

Annual rugby competition

- Sport: Rugby Union
- Founded: 1979
- No. of teams: Various
- Most recent champions: Old Blue RFC (MD1), Life University (WD1), Atlanta Old White (MD2), Syracuse Chargers (MD3), Life West Gladiatrix (WD2)
- Most titles: Old Blues RFC Berkeley Men (8) & Berkeley All Blues Women (11)

The USA Club Rugby XVs Championship is an annual competition pitting the best rugby union clubs in the United States. First played in 1979 under the supervision of the United States of America Rugby Union or USA Rugby. This competition for men and women is played in multiple divisions (Division I to III). The event is streamed online annually, typically on YouTube or The Rugby Channel.

From 1958 to 1979, the Monterey/Pebble Beach Classic in Monterey, CA was the de facto National Championship for clubs, colleges and military. Known at its conception in 1959 as the Monterey Rugby Tournament, the title went through several changes: Monterey National Rugby Tournament, 1962; Monterey National Rugby Championships, 1978; Monterey National Invitational Rugby Tournament, 1980; and Pebble Beach Rugby Classic, 1985 to the last tournament in 1990. This is the oldest tournament in North America. It was founded by Paul Andrew and steered through most of its years by Steve Yost. The games were discontinued in 1991 after failure to find a suitable venue.

By 1979, USA Rugby took over the running of the National Club Championship, with College starting in 1980. Club Divisions II (1992) and III (2000) for Men and Division II for Women (2001) being added through the 90's and the turn of the new millennia.

== Men's Division I Championship results ==
Season	Champion	Score	Runner-up	Location
1979	Old Blues RFC Berkeley	14 - 6	St. Louis Falcons	Kansas City
1980	Old Blues RFC Berkeley	20 - 6	St. Louis Falcons	Long Beach
1981	Old Blues RFC Berkeley	9 - 3	Old Blue RFC	Dayton
1982	Old Blues RFC Berkeley	13 - 6	Denver Barbarians	Palo Alto
1983	Old Blues RFC Berkeley	23 - 0	Dallas Harlequins	Chicago
1984	Dallas Harlequins	31 - 12	Los Angeles Rugby Club	Hartford
1985	Milwaukee RFC	10 - 4	Denver Barbarians	Chicago
1986	Old Blues RFC Berkeley	20 - 0	Old Blue RFC	Tampa
1987	Old Blues RFC Berkeley	28 - 10	Pittsburgh Rugby	Tampa
1988	OMBAC San Diego	29 - 12	Milwaukee RFC	Windhover
1989	OMBAC San Diego	19 - 9	Philadelphia Whitemarsh	Denver
1990	Denver Barbarians	21 - 13	Old Blues RFC Berkeley	Denver
1991	OMBAC San Diego	12 - 9	Washington Rugby Club	San Diego
1992	Old Blues RFC Berkeley	32 - 9	Mystic River	Denver
1993	OMBAC San Diego	30 - 13	Milwaukee RFC	Washington
1994	OMBAC San Diego	30 - 16	Life Running Eagles	Chicago
1995	Potomac	16 - 12	OMBAC San Diego	Austin
1996	OMBAC San Diego	23 - 12	Old Blues RFC Berkeley	Chicago
1997	Gentlemen of Aspen	31 - 25	Old Blue RFC	San Diego
1998	Gentlemen of Aspen	47 - 12	Old Blue RFC	San Diego
1999	Gentlemen of Aspen	30 - 13	San Francisco Golden Gate	Fairfield
2000	Gentlemen of Aspen	42 - 34	Hayward Rugby	Manchester
2001	San Mateo RFC	22 - 10	N.Y.A.C.	Indianola
2002	San Mateo RFC	37 - 3	Austin Blacks	Indianola
2003	Boston Irish Wolfhounds	14 - 5	San Mateo RFC	Indianola
2004	Boston Irish Wolfhounds	27 - 8	Austin Blacks	Indianola
2005	Santa Monica Rugby Club	42 - 14	Back Bay RFC	San Diego
2006	Santa Monica Rugby Club	57 - 19	Boston Irish Wolfhounds	San Diego
2007	Hayward Rugby	30 - 16	Austin Blacks	San Diego
2008	Life Running Eagles	15 – 14	Glendale Raptors	Glendale
2009	Gentlemen of Aspen	25 – 10	Las Vegas Blackjacks	Glendale
2010	Las Vegas Blackjacks	36 – 22	Belmont Shore RFC	Glendale
2011	Glendale Raptors	20 – 15	Olympic Club Rugby	Glendale
2012	Belmont Shore RFC	34 – 11	Glendale Raptors	Glendale
2013	Life Running Eagles	27 – 26	Old Puget Sound Beach	Madison
2014	Life Running Eagles	39 – 7	New Orleans Rugby	Madison
2015	N.Y.A.C.	44 – 39	Austin Blacks	Glendale
2016	Mystic River	45 – 33	Austin Blacks	Glendale
2017	Austin Huns	27 – 23	N.Y.A.C.	Glendale
2018	Mystic River	25 – 24	Belmont Shore RFC	Glendale
2019	Life Running Eagles	28 – 27	Austin Blacks	Obetz
2020-21	No champion due to COVID-19 pandemic			
2022	Dallas Rugby	42 – 16	Schuylkill River Exiles	Atlanta
2023	Austin Blacks	38 – 14	Old Blue RFC	St. Charles
2024	St. Louis Bombers Rugby Club	26 - 25	Belmont Shore RFC	Round Rock
2025	Belmont Shore RFC	27 - 12	Old Blue RFC	Indianapolis
2026	Old Blue RFC	48 – 28	Seattle Rugby Club	Chicago

== Women's Division I Championship results ==
Season	Champion	Score	Runner-up	Location
1979	Florida State Seminoles	4 - 0	Wisconsin Rugby	Arlington Heights
1980	Florida State Seminoles	14 - 0	Indianapolis Hoydens	Oakbrook
1981	Belmont Shore Rugby	7 - 6	Beantown Rugby	Dayton
1982	Beantown Rugby	25 - 0	Chicago Rugby	Oakbrook
1983	Beantown Rugby	11 – 10	Florida State Seminoles	Oakbrook
1984	Florida State Seminoles	11 - 6	Beantown Rugby	Oakbrook
1985	Florida State Seminoles	12 - 6	San Diego Surfers	San Francisco
1986	Beantown Rugby	8 - 4	Florida State Seminoles	Newport
1987	Beantown Rugby	6 - 4	Florida State Seminoles	San Diego
1988	Minnesota Gophers	18 - 0	Florida State Seminoles	Naperville
1989	Bay Area SheHawks	9 - 4	Florida State Seminoles	New Orleans
1990	Belmont Shore Rugby	12 - 3	Bay Area SheHawks	Minneapolis
1991	Beantown Rugby	19 - 0	Florida State Seminoles	Alexandria
1992	Bay Area SheHawks	19 - 0	Berkeley All Blues	Minneapolis
1993	Bay Area SheHawks		Beantown Rugby	
1994	Berkeley All Blues		Bay Area SheHawks	
1995	Bay Area SheHawks		Berkeley All Blues	
1996	Beantown Rugby		Berkeley All Blues	
1997	Berkeley All Blues	25 – 14	Maryland Stingers	
1998	Berkeley All Blues	28 – 16	Maryland Stingers	
1999	Berkeley All Blues	32 – 10	Beantown Rugby	
2000	Berkeley All Blues	24 – 21	Beantown Rugby	
2001	Berkeley All Blues	41 – 11	Beantown Rugby	
2002	Berkeley All Blues	17 – 6	New York Rugby	
2003	Berkeley All Blues	36 – 8	Minnesota Valkyries	
2004	Berkeley All Blues	58 – 0	Minnesota Valkyries	
2005	Berkeley All Blues	32 – 20 (OT)	Minnesota Valkyries	
2006	New York Rugby	22 – 17	Berkeley All Blues	
2007	Berkeley All Blues	25 – 18	Beantown Rugby	
2008	Berkeley All Blues	25 – 17	New York Rugby	
2009	San Diego Surfers	14 – 0	Northern Virginia Rugby	
2010	San Diego Surfers	16 – 12	Atlanta Harlequins	Mesa
2011	Chicago North Shore	13 – 5	Glendale Raptors	Virginia Beach
2012	Atlanta Harlequins	33 – 14	Oregon Sports Union	Fort Myers
2013	No Championship Held Due to Women's League Restructure			
2014	Oregon Sports Union	39 – 7	Chicago North Shore	Madison
2015	Seattle Rugby Club	31 – 24	Beantown Rugby	Glendale
2016	Seattle Rugby Club	54 – 21	Chicago North Shore	Glendale
2017	Life West Gladiatrix	39 – 17	Raleigh Venom	Glendale
2018	Life West Gladiatrix	91 – 22	Raleigh Venom	Glendale
2019	Northern Virginia Rugby	24 - 22	Austin Valkyries	Obetz
2020-21	No champion due to COVID-19 pandemic			
2022	Northern Virginia Rugby	27 - 19	Colorado Gray Wolves	Atlanta
2023	San Diego Surfers	45 - 22	Northern Virginia Rugby	St. Charles
2024	Northern Virginia Rugby	44 - 12	Utah Vipers	Round Rock
2025	Utah Vipers	45 - 34	Northern Virginia Rugby	Indianapolis
2026	Life	69 - 12	Utah Vipers	Chicago

== Men's Division II Championship results ==
Season	Champion	Score	Runner-up	Location
1992	Battleship Rugby	12 - 11	Nashville Rugby	Mobile
1993	Santa Rosa Rugby		Nashville Rugby	Mobile
1994	Santa Rosa Rugby		Lincoln Park Rugby	Austin
1995	Michigan Rugby		San Fernando Valley Rugby	Austin
1996	Snake River Rugby	29 – 15	Tempe Old Devils	Chicago
1997	*Winning Team was disqualified*	22 – 16	Huntington Beach Unicorns	San Diego
1998	Wisconsin Rugby	16 – 8	Frederick Rugby	San Diego
1999	Orange County Islanders	32 – 22	Grand Rapids Gazelles	Lemont
2000	Fort Worth Rugby	22 - 17	Grand Rapids Gazelles	Rockford
2001	The Woodlands Rugby	42 - 35	Milwaukee RFC	Rockford
2002	New Haven Old Black	48 - 27	South Side Irish	Pittsburgh
2003	Riverside Rugby	41 - 15	Tempe Old Devils	Pittsburgh
2004	Fairfield Yankees	23 - 3	Nashville Rugby	Pittsburgh
2005	Park City Haggis	26 - 17	Atlanta Old White	San Diego
2006	Pearl City Black Bears	32 - 5	Santa Barbara Grunion	San Diego
2007	Raleigh Vipers	29 - 27	Red Mountain Warthogs	San Diego
2008	Red Mountain Warthogs	41 - 18	Brandywine Rugby	Glendale
2009	East Palo Alto Razorbacks	46 - 22	Albuquerque Aardvarks	Glendale
2010	Tampa Bay Krewe	29 - 17 (OT)	Doylestown Dragons	Glendale
2011	New Orleans Rugby	27 - 21	Tampa Bay Krewe	Glendale
2012	Rocky Gorge Rugby	37 - 26	Wisconsin Rugby	Glendale
2013	Wisconsin Rugby	60 - 27	Wilmington Rugby	Glendale
2014	Rocky Gorge Rugby	29 - 5	Tempe Old Devils	Madison
2015	Life West Gladiators	43 - 10	Wisconsin Rugby	Glendale
2016	Tempe Old Devils	54 - 21	Detroit Tradesmen	Glendale
2017	Life Running Eagles	50 - 24	St. Louis Bombers	Glendale
2018	Denver Barbarians	39 - 38	Detroit Tradesmen	Glendale
2019	Olympic Club Rugby	12 -10	Atlanta Old White	Obetz
2020-21	No champion due to COVID-19 pandemic			
2022	Charlotte Rugby Club	35 - 24	Denver Barbarians	Atlanta
2023	Denver Barbarians	46 - 34	Boise United	St. Charles
2024	Miami Tridents	38 - 10	Oceanside Chiefs	Round Rock
2025	Atlanta Old White	39 - 8	Boise United	Indianapolis
2026	Atlanta Old White	32 - 10	North Bay	Chicago

== Women's Division II Championship results ==
Season	Champion	Score	Runner-up	Location
2001	Ann Arbor Rugby	28 – 0	Minneapolis Menagerie	Pittsburgh
2002	Village Lions		Minneapolis Menagerie	Cincinnati
2003	Detroit Rugby	11 – 10	Cincinnati-Dayton Rugby	Minneapolis
2004	Detroit Rugby	29 – 26	Cincinnati-Dayton Rugby	Monmouth
2005	Raleigh Venom	8 – 6	Detroit Rugby	Naples
2006	Raleigh Venom	22 – 5	Albany Knickerbockers	Raleigh
2007	Detroit Rugby	15 – 5	Scioto Valley Rugby	Sanford
2008	Orlando Rugby	27 – 17	Detroit Rugby	Orlando
2009	Raleigh Venom	12 – 0	Pittsburgh Angels	Houston
2010	Albany Knickerbockers	34 – 22	Albuquerque Atomic Sisters	Mesa
2011	Raleigh Venom	17 – 0	Pittsburgh Angels	Virginia Beach
2012	Pittsburgh Angels	8 – 0	Severn River Rugby	Fort Myers
2013	No Championship Held Due to Women's League Restructure			
2014	Pittsburgh Angels	36 – 21	Sacramento Amazons	Madison
2015	Wisconsin Rugby	66 – 20	Sacramento Amazons	Glendale
2016	Life West Gladiatrix	66 – 20	Wisconsin Rugby	Glendale
2017	Milwaukee Scylla	16 – 15	San Francisco Golden Gate	Glendale
2018	Charlotte Rugby Club	46 – 28	St. Louis Sabres	Glendale
2019	Sacramento Amazons	53 - 42	Harrisburg Rugby	Obetz
2020-21	No champion due to COVID-19 pandemic			
2022	Providence	25 - 8	Knoxville Minx	Atlanta
2023	Knoxville Minx	33 – 22	Severn River Rugby	St. Charles
2024	Tampa Bay Krewe	59 - 14	White Horse Phoenixville	Round Rock
2025	Las Vegas Rugby	28 - 24	White Horse Phoenixville	Indianapolis
2026	Life West Gladiatrix	24 - 12	Tampa Bay Krewe	Chicago

== Men's Division III Championship results ==
Season	Champion	Score	Runner-up	Location
2000	Boston Rugby	30 – 18	Stanislaus Rugby	Rockford
2001	Battleship Rugby	23 – 12	Milwaukee Westside Harlequins	Rockford
2002	Chico Mighty Oaks	47 – 5	Clinton Muddy River	Pittsburgh
2003	Reno Zephyrs	28 – 10	Clinton Muddy River	Pittsburgh
2004	Clinton Muddy River	22 – 19	Reno Zephyrs	Pittsburgh
2005	Pearl City Black Bears	26 – 10	Montauk Sharks	San Diego
2006	Mission Rugby	32 – 22	Boston Irish Wolfhounds	San Diego
2007	Boston Irish Wolfhounds	55 – 5	Mission Rugby	San Diego
2008	Reno Zephyrs	31 – 27	Michiana Moose	Glendale
2009	Northern State Wolves	67 – 22	Beaumont Bluehawks	Glendale
2010	OMBAC San Diego	28 – 14	St. Louis Royals	Glendale
2011	Metropolis Rugby	46 – 25	Syracuse Chargers	Glendale
2012	New Orleans Rugby	36 – 20	Philadelphia Whitemarsh Rugby	Glendale
2013	Oceanside Chiefs	44 – 40 (3OT)	Old Blue of New York	Glendale
2014	Old Blue of New York	25 – 7	Life West Gladiators	Madison
2015	Wichita Barbarians	30 – 28	Tri-City Barbarians	Glendale
2016	Fairfield Yankees	54 – 21	Euless Texans	Glendale
2017	St. Louis Royals	29 – 19	Bremer County Bucks	Glendale
2018	Austin Blacks	33 – 18	Long Island Rugby	Glendale
2019	Austin Blacks	48 - 12	Grand Rapids Gazelles	Obetz
2020-21	No champion due to COVID-19 pandemic			
2022	Palm Beach Panthers	48 - 7	Union County Mudturtles	Atlanta
2023	Austin Blacks	18 - 14	Colorado Springs Grizzlies	St. Charles
2024	Austin Blacks	86 - 0	Colusa County	Round Rock
2025	Columbia Rhinos	36 - 19	Scottsdale Rugby	Indianapolis
2026	Syracuse Chargers	46 - 44	Brevard Old Red Eye	Chicago

== See also ==
- History of rugby union in the United States
- USA Rugby
