= 1993 National Rugby Championships =

Tournament details
- Tournament format(s): Various
- Date: 1993

Tournament statistics

Final

The 1993 National Rugby Championships were a series of tournaments organized by the United States RFU to determine a national champion in several divisions for United States rugby teams. The divisions included club, college, high school, military, sevens, all–stars and local union.

== Men's Club ==
The 1993 USA Rugby National Club Championship took place at the Catholic University in Washington, DC from May 8–9. The teams featured in the tournament were the champions of the four sub unions of USARFU. OMBAC of San Diego, CA won its fourth national title. Lock Rick Crivellone of OMBAC was the MVP.

Regional Semifinal
April 10 - Long Beach, CA
OMBAC	14
San Francisco	3
April 10 - Long Beach, CA
Old Blues	43
Belmont Shore	34
December 5 - Columbia, SC
Potomac AC	31
Norfolk Blues	6
December 5 - Columbia, SC
Life College	26
Old Blue	19
November 7 - Lemont, IL
Milwaukee	57
Des Moines	6
November 7 - Lemont, IL
Scioto Valley	17
Pittsburgh	6
April 26 - Dallas, TX
Kansas City Blues	28
Houston Old Boys	11
April 26 - Dallas, TX
Dallas Harlequins	31
Boulder	12

Regional Final
April 11 - Long Beach, CA
OMBAC	27
Old Blues	14
December 6 - Columbia, SC
Potomac AC	23
Life College	0
November 8 - Lemont, IL
Milwaukee	23
Scioto Valley	18
April 27 - Dallas, TX
Kansas City Blues	32
Dallas Harlequins	25

National Semifinal
May 8 - Washington, DC
OMBAC	21
Potomac AC	8
May 8 - Washington, DC
Milwaukee	31
Kansas City Blues	13

National Final
May 9 - Washington, DC
OMBAC	30
Milwaukee	13
Third place
May 9 - Washington, DC
Potomac AC	23
Kansas City Blues	8

=== Semifinals ===
8 May 1993
3:00PM

Milwaukee	31–13	Kansas City Blues
Try: Rich Matiszik 6' c Shawn McLaughlin 13' c Mike Landry 28' c Rich Matiszik 54'; Rich Matiszik 80'; Con: Simon Bailey		Try: Travis Williams 23' c Con: Schaun Colin; Pen: Schaun Colin 32', 2H'

Washington, DC
Attendance: 1500
Referee: Don Reordan (USA)

8 May 1993
5:00PM

OMBAC	21–8	Potomac AC
Try: Tom Short 8'; Duncan Lumsden 61' c Con: Sean Doherty; Pen: Jason McVeigh 5', 18'; Drop: Sean Doherty 55'		Try: Tom Lyons 33'; Pen: Neil Williams 45'

Washington, DC
Referee: B. Loftus (Chicago)

=== Third place ===
9 May 1993
1:00PM

Potomac AC	23–8	Kansas City Blues
Try: Chris Schrichte 24'; John Jasper 39'; Phil Vivaldi 57' c Con: Neil Williams; Pen: Mike O'Neil 5'; Drop: Neil Williams 75'		Try: Chuck McKeon 70'; Pen: Chuck McKeon 11'

Washington, DC
Referee: Bob Loftus (USA)

=== Final ===
9 May 1993
11:00AM

OMBAC	30–13	Milwaukee
Try: Jason McVeigh 8'; Ben Hough 17'; Brian Vizard 36'; Jon Lee 46' c Jason McVeigh; Con: Jason McVeigh; Pen: Jason McVeigh 6'		Try: Rich Matiszik 57' c Con: Simon Bailey; Pen: Simon Bailey (2)

Washington, DC
Referee: Don Reordan (USA)

Champions: Old Mission Beach Athletic Club
Staff: Rolls, McFadyen, Coogan, Ramirez, Downes
Captain: Mike Saunders (Scrumhalf)
Roster: Sean Allen (Hooker), Gabriel Araujo (Prop), Clark Bernales (Flanker), Scott Bracken (Prop), Kevin Casey (Flanker), Dave Crist (Center), Rick Crivellone (Lock), Sean Doherty (Center/Fullback), Kelly Dolan (Lock), Jerry Fanning (Hooker), John Gibb (Scrumhalf), Dennis Gonzalez (Flanker), Matt Heasley (Center), John Hinken (Wing), Ben Hough (#8/Flanker), Solo Komai (Flanker), Jon Lee (Wing), Chris Lippert (Prop), Duncan Lumsden (Fullback), Simon Mathews (Flyhalf/Fullback), Jason McVeigh (Flyhalf), Kevin Perry (Prop), Joe Santos (Center/Wing), Mike Saunders (Scrumhalf), Tom Short (Center/Wing), Brian Vizard (#8), Brad Walker (Lock), Frank Zugovitz (Lock).

== Club Division II ==
The 1993 National Division II Championship was the second edition of this tournament held May 8–9 at the USS Alabama Memorial Park in Mobile, AL. The Santa Rosa club of California was the champion.
Tournament MVP was Santa Rosa flyhalf Greg DeJoux.

Regional Semifinal
April 11 - Long Beach, CA
Santa Rosa	34
Old Aztecs	12
April 11 - Long Beach, CA
Riverside	56
Skyline	0
April 26 - Dallas, TX
Austin Huns	63
Kohlfield Scorpions	8
April 26 - Dallas, TX
Denton County	21
Topeka	3
April 17 - Chicago, IL
Nashville	26
Dayton	0
April 17 - Chicago, IL
Fox Valley	12
South Side Irish	0
December 5 - Columbia, SC
Severn River	22
Cape Fear	14
December 5 - Columbia, SC
Albany Knicks	40
Battleship	15

Regional Final
April 11 - Long Beach, CA
Santa Rosa	22
Riverside	15
April 27 - Dallas, TX
Austin Huns	7
Denton County	3
April 18 - Chicago, IL
Nashville	8
Fox Valley	0
December 6 - Columbia, SC
Severn River	21
Albany Knicks	18

National Semifinal
May 8 - Mobile, AL
Santa Rosa	18
Austin Huns	15
May 8 - Mobile, AL
Nashville	20
Severn River	5

National Final
May 9 - Mobile, AL
Santa Rosa	21
Nashville	5
Third place
May 9 - Mobile, AL
Severn River	17
Austin Huns	7

Semifinals

8 May 1993
12:00PM

Nashville	20–5	Severn River
Try: Eric Raney 36'; David Brooks 60' c Marcus Williamson 71'; Con: David Brooks; Pen: David Brooks 25'		Try: Doug Stump 45'

Mobile, AL
Referee: Mike Geach (West)

8 May 1993
2:00PM

Santa Rosa	18–15	Austin Huns
Try: Chris Orr 36' c Dan McMillon; Con: Greg DeJoux; Pen: Greg DeJoux 8', 17'		Try: Thierry Dubose 1H', 64'; Graham Watson 70'

Mobile, AL
Referee: Jerry McLemore (Midwest)

Third place

9 May 1993
11:00AM

Severn River	17–7	Austin Huns
Try: Bill Antlitz 46' c Colin Rand 56' c Roger Coleman; Con: Colin Rand		Try: Jack Bloom 17' c Con: Dave Sugden

Mobile, AL
Referee: Jerry McLemore (Midwest)

Final

9 May 1993
1:00PM

Santa Rosa	21–5	Nashville
Try: Jason Mahaere 8', 55'; Greg DeJoux 61'; Pen: Greg DeJoux 5', 13'		Try: Keith Burnett

Mobile, AL
Referee: Mike Geach (West)

Champions: Santa Rosa
Coach: Pete Eiermann
Roster: Kahaulelio, Ratcliff, Jason Mahaere, Bodwin, Doug Orr, Amsbrufy, Dan Maloney, Matt Eshoo, John Tomasin, Greg DeJoux, Pickford, Rivera, Chris Orr, Gilligan, Dan McMillon, Wongking, Hensley, Dunbar, Bertolone.

== Women's Club ==
The 1993 Women's National Rugby Championship was an eight team tournament and played at California State University Long Beach in Long Beach, CA on May 29–30. The Bay Area Shehawks won the title by defeating Beantown 6–5. Florida State took third place.

Quarterfinals

29 May 1993

Beantown	54–0	Colorado Olde Girls

Long Beach, CA

29 May 1993

Florida State	30–0	New Orleans Halfmoons

Long Beach, CA

29 May 1993

Bay Area SheHawks	25–0	Chicago

Long Beach, CA

29 May 1993

Twin City Amazons	13–11	Berkeley All–Blues

Long Beach, CA

Seventh place

30 May 1993

Chicago	18–5	Colorado Olde Girls

Long Beach, CA

Fifth place

30 May 1993

Berkeley All–Blues	W–L	New Orleans Halfmoons

Long Beach, CA

Semifinals

29 May 1993

Beantown	23–3	Twin City Amazons
Try: Kerry Kilander; Mary Sullivan; Alex Williamson; Amy Westerman; Pen: 1		Pen: 1

Long Beach, CA

29 May 1993

Bay Area SheHawks	23–10	Florida State
Try: Koreen Keith walkover c Teresa Mauldin; Con: Jos Bergman; Pen: Jos Bergman 1H', 62'		Try: Patty Jervey 15'; BB Alley 56'

Long Beach, CA
Referee: Paul Champ

Third place

30 May 1993

Florida State	15–10	Twin City Amazons
Try: Mary Waller; Elita Lerner; Claire Godwin		Try: Teresa Taylor; Sue Shierverand

Long Beach, CA

Final

30 May 1993

Bay Area Shehawks	6–5	Beantown
Pen: Joslin Bergman 1', 1H'		Try: Brett Newton

Long Beach, CA
Attendance: 500
Referee: Gary Andrews

Lineups:
Bay Area SheHawks– Kathy Morrison (Coach), Weix, Pepper, Schawver, Surr, Cook, Meredith, Law, Murray, Kelly, Bergmann, Zdarko, Misko, Mauldin, Gutierrez, Keith (Cote).
Beantown– Flavin, Palmacci, Hertz, Stevens, Rutkowski, Spicer–Bourdon, Kilander, Williams, Connell, Dixey, Sullivan, Craven, Morrissey, Newton, Westerman.

== College ==
The 1993 College championship was won by UC Berkeley with a win over Army. Boston College won the second edition of the Women's Collegiate Championship. The College All–Star Championship was won by the Pacific Coast while the East was runner–up.

== Military ==
The 1993 National Military Rugby Championship were hosted by the Columbus/Fort Benning Cruise–a–matics rugby club and took place at French and Blue Fields in Fort Benning, GA from April 29 to May 2. There were 18 teams that participated in the event. The club division was won by Pensacola with a win over Fort Benning. Pensacola scrumhalf Mark Pidcock and Fort Benning lock E.J. Hall were the MVPs. West Point beat Fort Bragg 43–6 to win the consolation bracket.The Fort Benning Cruise–a–matics won the 7s tournament 28–17 over the Fort Benning Rebels. In the Open division the President's XV won the title 17–10 over the Exiles.

The club division groups were the following:
1 - Pensacola, Quantico, Ft Leonard Wood, Ft Sill
2 - Wright-Patterson AFB, Army, Navy, Camp Lejeune
3 - USUHS Camp Pendleton, Eglin AFB, Ft Bragg, Ft Rucker
4 - Ft Benning, Whiteman AFB, Ft Polk, Scott AFB, Panama

The open division groups were the following:
1 - President's XV, DOC, Gulf Coast
2 - Exiles, Ft Hood, Cherry Point

Path to championship:
Pensacola 28–0 Quantico
Pensacols 43–0 Fort Leonard Wood
Pensacola 46–0 Fort Sill

Path to final:
Fort Benning 11–12 Scott AFB
Fort Benning 59–0 Fort Polk
Fort Benning 53–0 Whiteman AFB

Championship bracket

Quarter-finals
May 2 – Fort Benning, GA
Pensacola NAS	33
Wright–Patterson	3
May 2 – Fort Benning, GA
Camp Lejeune	W
Quantico	L
May 2 – Fort Benning, GA
Fort Benning	W
Camp Pendleton	L
May 2 – Fort Benning, GA
USUHS	W
USSOCOM	L

Semi-finals
May 2 – Fort Benning, GA
Pensacola NAS	41
Camp Lejeune	13
May 2 – Fort Benning, GA
Fort Benning	W
USUHS	L

Final
May 2 – Fort Benning, GA
Pensacola NAS	6
Fort Benning	3
Third place
May 2 – Fort Benning, GA
Camp Lejeune
USUHS

Club Championship

2 May 1993

Pensacola	6–3	Fort Benning
Pen: Keith Takabayashi 2'; Mark Pidcock 18'		Pen: Malcolm Frost

Fort Benning, GA
Referee: Jerry McLemore (West

Lineups:
Pensacola– Stasko, Sands, Speece, Sheran, Heard, Liebe, Edgarton, Brown, Takabayashi, Pidcock, Traq, Hughes, Anderson, Kumagai, Michles.
Fort Benning– Allen, Kreuger, Frescura, Hensley, Hall, Monaco, McGinnis, Morton, Strafer (Kostecki), Lissner, Weyand, Goldhammer, Mennes, Frost, Monnard.

The 1993 Interservice Rugby Championship was held at the Pensacola Naval Air Station in Florida from 9 to 11 September. The teams involved were select sides of each service branch. From these teams a selection was made to field the Combined Services Rugby team for tours. Navy was the championship for the first time.

Results:

Round Robin					Scores				
Rank	Standings	Pld	W	L	NAV	MAR	ARM	AIR	COA
1.	Navy	4	3	1	X	8:5	12:13	10:8	35:0
2.	Marines	4	3	1	5:8	X	12:0	18:5	32:11
3.	Army	4	3	1	13:12	0:12	X	18:10	17:5
4.	Air Force	4	1	3	8:10	5:18	10:18	X	22:5
5.	Coast Guard	4	0	4	0:35	11:32	5:17	5:22	X

Wooden Spoon
Coast Guard

Third place

11 September 1993

Air Force	29–17	Army

Pensacola, FL

Championship

11 September 1993

Navy	20–7	Marines
Try: Mark Pidcock 7'; Eric Wick 16'; Craig Haines; Mark Pidcock		Try: Tim Taillon 2' c Con: Keith Takabayashi

Pensacola, FL
Referee: Bruce Carter (NorCal)

Lineups:
Navy– Gary Stasco (Coach), Speece, Fleming (DiGuardo), Taylor, Walker (Kirby), McLaughlin, Wick (Edgarton), Guinan, Gabe Puello, Mark Pidcock, Shay, Sinibaldi (Faraimo), Koyne, Long, Williams, Hurni.
Marines– Danny Meredith (Coach), Schill, Church, Turman, Brown, Wynn (Flynn), Jacobs, Pelham, Murphy (Gilligan), Kurz (Haines), Bowlin, Pooler (Kumagai), Taillon, Washington, Evergin, Takabayashi.

== Sevens ==
Club
The 1993 National Club Sevens championship, was played at Dillon Stadium in Hartford, CT from 21 to 22 August. There were eight teams featured which included two representatives from each of the four territorial unions. Metropolis and Milwaukee qualified from the Midwest. Old Blue and OMEX (Old Maroon of Essex County) qualified from the East. Tempe and Tacoma represented the Pacific Coast. Dallas Reds and Kansas City Blues represented the West. Old Blue defeated the KC Blues to win the championship.

Path to championship:
Old Blue 24-17 Kansas City Blues
Old Blue 26-0 Tempe
Old Blue 33-5 Metropolis

Semifinals
Old Blue 45-7 OMEX
Kansas City 17-12 Milwaukee

Final
Old Blue 40-22 Kansas City Blues

All Star
The 1993 National All-Star Sevens rugby tournament was an eight team tournament with two representatives from each territory. The other purpose of the tournament was to select members for the U.S. Eagles Seven–a–side team. This year's tournament took place at Dillon Stadium in Hartford, CT from 21 to 22 August. The Pacific Coast I team won the final 35–17 over the East II team. West I came in third.

Semifinals
East 2 19–17 Midwest
Pacific 1 W–L West

Final
Pacific Coast 1 35-17 East 2

== All–Star ==
In 1993 The National All–Star Championship featured six teams and took place at Englewood High School in Denver, CO from May 29–31. This edition included the four regional rugby union teams as well as the U.S. Military's Combined Services team and the U.S. Jewish Olympic team Maccabiah. The Western Mustangs won the tournament with three wins. The MVPs were Western scrumhalves David James and Greg Goodman.

Results:

29 May 1993
10:00AM

Pacific Coast	39–19	Combined Services
Try: Ramon Samaniego (2); Mike Moe (2); Hinkin; Short; Con: Barry Williams (3); Pen: Barry Williams		Try: Graves c Con: Pidcock; Pen: Shay (3); Moore

Denver, CO
Referee: Mark Binning (East)

29 May 1993
12:00PM

West	35–22	Maccabiah
Try: Williams; Englebrecht; Goodman; Van der Molen; Mazerolle; Con: Gale (2); Pen: Gale (2)		Try: Lipman c Con: Kane; Pen: Kane (3); Schleifer (2)

Denver, CO
Referee: Mike Geach (West)

29 May 1993
2:00PM

East	38–6	Midwest
Try: Winters; Johnson; Fenn; Kennedy; Con: Caulder (3); Pen: Caulder (4)		Pen: Konczak (2)

Denver, CO

30 May 1993
10:00AM

Midwest	23–0	Combined Services
Try: Konczak; Blaska; Varnes; Panyard; Pen: Pickston

Denver, CO
Referee: Jerry McLemore (West)

30 May 1993
12:00PM

West	30–26	Maccabiah
Try: Kreutzer (3) c Schlereth c Con: Colin (4); Pen: Colin (5)		Try: S. Calmas; Simon; Con: Lipschitz; Pen: Kane

Denver, CO
Referee: Dave Head (Pacific)

30 May 1993
2:00PM

Pacific Coast	45–19	East
Try: Schurfeld (2); Hein (2); Hansen; Con: O'Brien (4); Pen: O'Brien (4)		Try: Kennedy (2); Pen: Judge (3)

Denver, CO
Referee: Bob Loftus (Midwest)

Fifth place

31 May 1993
9:45AM

Maccabiah	33–17	Combined Services
Try: Schleifer; Spielman; Gordon; Karetsky; Con: Schleifer (2); Pen: Schleifer (3)		Try: Pidcock; Drummond; Sinibaldi; Con: Pidcock (2)

Denver, CO
Referee: Scott Miller (West)

Third place

31 May 1993
11:15AM

East	41–36	Midwest
Try: Simpson (2); Geraghty (2); Con: Judge (3); Pen: Judge (5)		Try: Flohre; Gosch; Blaska; Con: Konczak (3); Pen: Konczak (5)

Denver, CO
Referee: Ed Sorenson (East)

Championship

31 May 1993
1:00PM

West	39–27	Pacific Coast
Try: Glass; Mazerolle; Van der Molen; Schlereth; Brown; Con: Gale; Pen: Gale (3); Drop: Gale		Try: Steinbauer; Short; Williams; Kelder; Con: O'Brien (2); Pen: O'Brien

Denver, CO
Referee: Don Reordan (Pacific)

Team		W	L	F	A
1	Western Mustangs	3	0	104	75
2	Pacific Coast Grizzlies	2	1	111	77
3	Eastern Colonials	2	1	98	87
4	Midwest Thunderbirds	1	2	65	79
5	Maccabiah	1	2	81	82
6	Combined Services	0	3	36	95

Champions: Western Mustangs
Staff: Larry Naifeh (Coach), Ron Laszewski (Asst.), John Godsman (Manager), Carrie Guvito (Trainer)
Captains Mark Pedersen–Flanker (Houston), Greg Goodman–Scrumhalf (Dallas Harlequins)
Roster: Locks– Jim Angstman (Dallas Harlequins), Tony Duplisse (Dallas Harlequins), Norbert Mueller (Dallas Harlequins), Bob Reininga (Denver Barbarians); Flyhalves– Schaun Colin (KC Blues), Mark Gale (Dallas Harlequins); Hookers– Steve Brown (Boulder), Brett Taylor (Dallas Harlequins); Flankers– Scott Emerson (Kansas University), Leland Means (Austin), Sean O'Brien (Denver Barbarians), Mark Van Der Molen (Denver Barbarians); Centers– Greg Kreutzer (Columbia Outlaws), Michael Waterman (Dallas Harlequins), Steve Whittington (Houston), Mark Williams (Aspen); Wings– Michael Engelbrecht (Dallas Harlequins), Mike Glass (Rio Grande), Michael Mazerolle (Houston Old Boys), Chris Schlereth (St. Louis Bombers); Scrumhalves– Greg Goodman (Dallas Harlequins), David James (Denver Barbarians); #8s– Brannan Smoot (Dallas Harlequins); Props– Brian Monaghan (Dallas Reds), Norman Mottram (Boulder), John Toole (Denver Barbarians), Duane Watts (Dallas Harlequins); Fullback– Greg Jarvis (Kansas University), Travis Williams (KC Blues).

Junior All–Star
The 1993 Junior All–Star competition took place in Denver, CO. The Midwest were the winners. East was second and West finished third.

Women's All–Star
The seventh edition of the Women's All–Star was hosted by Florida State women's rugby club and played at Godby High School from December 5–6 in Tallahassee, FL. The Pacific Coast and East tied for first, West was third and Midwest fourth.

5 December 1992

East	60–0	West
Try: Mary Dixey(2); Patty Connell (2)2; Beth Grohovsky (2); Vicky Bowlin; Jan Auger; Kirsten Vernon; Colleen Fahey; Con: Amy Westerman (4); Vicky Bowlin

Tallahassee, FL

5 December 1992

Pacific Coast	54–5	West
Try: Jos Bergman (2); Jen Crawford (2); Pam Irby; Sharon Girardi; Kim Green; Kim Cobb; Jim Vialet; Con: Jos Bergman (4); Pen: Jos Bergman 2		Try: Cyndi Miller

Tallahassee, FL

5 December 1992

West	38–15	Midwest
Try: Krista McFarren c Tracy Henderson c Peggy Claiborne c Michelle Johnson c Tracy Henderson c Con: Chris Minsky; Pen: Chris Minsky		Try: Christie Nixon c Con: Christie Nixon; Pen: Christie Nixon

Tallahassee, FL

5 December 1992

East	13–13	Pacific
Try: Jan Rutkowski; Alex Williams 59'; Pen: Amy Westerman		Try: Vicky Cody; Jen Crawford; Drop: Jen Crawford 61'

Tallahassee, FL

6 December 1992

East	27–3	Midwest
Try: Mary Dixey 1'; Vicky Bowlin 25'; Patty Connell; Candi Orsini; Kati Kovacs; Con: Amy Westerman		Pen: Christie Nixon 3'

Tallahassee, FL

6 December 1992

Pacific Coast	32–5	East
Try: Kim Cobb c Jen Crawford; Karen Cook; Pam Irby; Betsy Hill; Con: Jos Bergman (2); Pen: Jos Bergman		Try: Tania Hahn

Tallahassee, FL

== Local Union ==
The 1993 National Local Union Championship took place in Lemont, IL from June 12–13. This tournament brought together the Local Union champions of the four regional territories. Metropolitan New York represented the Northeast, Chicago Area represented the Midwest RFU, Texas represented the Western RFU, and the Pacific Coast RFU representative, Southern California had to withdraw and was replaced by Deep South. Metropolitan New York were the champions. Met NY fullback Dan Kennedy was Most Valuable Back and Met NY #8 Adrian Scott was Most Valuable Forward.

Semifinals

12 June 1993

Met New York	44–18	Texas
Try: Doug Erickson 21' c Paul Holdstock 25'; Tom Rodgers 35'; Adrian Scott 51'; Greg McAllister 60' c Kevin Bowman 63'; Drew Fautley 68' c Con: Bill Russell; Pen: Paul Holdstock 48'		Try: Larry Wydermeyer; Craig Hyer c Con: Britt Coffman; Pen: Steve Mitchell 18', 54'

Lemont, IL
Referee: Don Reordan (USA)

12 June 1993

Chicago Area	63–7	Deep South
Try: Bob Kuras 7'; Steve Blashka 13', 49'; Russell Hyde 20', 67' c, 69' c Mark Sawicki 29' c John Bell 55', 2H' c Pat Bolger 58', 70'; Con: Matt Pickston; Pen: Mike Telkamp 71'		Try: Joe Goodwin 43' c Con: John Garrigan

Lemont, IL
Referee: Tim Walsh (CARFU)

Third place

13 June 1993

Texas	30–13	Deep South
Try: Bill Bartok 59'; Gary Heitman 66' c Larry Wydermeyer 72'; Steve Binion c Con: Sean Conlan; Steve Mitchell; Pen: Sean Conlan 12', 45'		Try: Dave Culpepper 25'; Con: John Garrigan; Pen: John Garrigan 31', 55'

Lemont, IL
Referee: Tim Walsh (CARFU)

Final

13 June 1993

Met New York	19–12	Chicago Area
Try: Dan Kennedy 19' c, 2H' c Paul Holdstock 52'; Con: Bill Russell		Try: Larry Zeno 43' c Jeff Campbell 63'; Con: Matt Pickston

Lemont, IL
Referee: Don Reordan (USA)

Champions: Metropolitan New York
Staff: Jacko Jackson (President), Colin Kiley (Coach), Dean Carson (Manager), Bruce McLane (Assistant Manager)
Roster: Props– Chuck Donigian (Old Blue), John Galloway (White Plains), Jim Louro (Monmouth); Hookers– Joe Casella (White Plains), Frank Romano (Manhattan); Locks– Derek DeLapp (New York), Drew Fautley (New York); Flankers– Kevin Bowman (Monmouth), Ned Elton (Old Blue), Matt Heisler (Old Blue), Vinnie Laino (Old Blue), Rich Podlucki (Monmouth); #8s– Adrian Scott (Old Blue), Gary Lambert (White Plains); Scrumhalf– Joss Raven (Manhattan); Flyhalf– Greg McAllister (Old Blue); Centers– Doug Erickson (White Plains), Kirk Miller (Manhattan), Bill Russell (Old Blue); Wings– Paul Holdstock (Winged Foot), Tom Rodgers (Old Blue), Andy Koefler (White Plains); Fullback– Dan Kennedy (Old Blue).

== High School ==
The 1993 National High School Rugby Championship was a twelve team tournament that took place from 14 to 15 May at Magnuson Park in Seattle, WA. The Xavier squad from New York won the championship by defeating Highland of Salt Lake City, UT in the final.

Scores:
Group I
Highland 24-3 Walt Whitman
Littleton 10-3 Walt Whitman
Highland 20-0 Littleton
Group II
Redmond 8-7 Ben Davis
Redmond 22-17 Doylestown
Doylestown 13-3 Ben Davis
Group III
Skyline 14-3 St. Louis Druids
Skyline 20-6 Valley Joeys
St. Louis Druids 14-5 Valley Joeys
Group IV
Xavier 22-8 Parkhill
Kentwood 20-0 Parkhill
Xavier 12-3 Kentwood

Consolation

15 May 1993
9:30AM

Littleton	5–13	Doylestown

Seattle, WA

15 May 1993
9:30AM

St. Louis Druids	7–12	Kentwood

Seattle, WA

15 May 1993
11:30AM

Walt Whitman	7–0	Ben Davis

Seattle, WA

15 May 1993
11:30AM

Valley Joeys	12–7	Parkhill

Seattle, WA

Eleventh place

15 May 1993

Ben Davis	12–5	Parkhill

Seattle, WA

Ninth place

15 May 1993

Valley Joeys	8–0	Walt Whitman

Seattle, WA

Seventh place

15 May 1993

Valley Joeys	8–0	Walt Whitman

Seattle, WA

Fifth place

15 May 1993

Doylestown	7–5	Kentwood

Seattle, WA

Semifinals

15 May 1993
10:30AM

Highland	28–0	Redmond
Try: Andy Brinton; Lihai Makoni; Jon Law; Brett Steele

Seattle, WA

15 May 1993
10:30AM

Skyline	7–10	Xavier
Try: Ryan Hodgson c Con: Robb Reinhold		Try: Joe Lozito c Con: Finbar Carrig; Pen: Finbar Carrig

Seattle, WA

Third place

15 May 1993

Redmond	15–5	Skyline

Seattle, WA

=== Final ===
15 May 1993
4:30PM

Xavier	6–3	Highland
Pen: Finbar Carrig 78', 83'		Pen: Taylor Scalley 1H'

Seattle, WA
Referee: Ian Hyde–Lay

Lineups:
Highland– Larry Gelwix (Coach), Buehner, Watkins, Bradley, Hawes (Captain), Petersen, Henricksen, Moreno, Brinton, Berg, Schroepfer, Makoni, Steele, Fihaki, Law, Scalley.
Xavier– Mike Tolkin (Coach), Pat Cusanelli (Coach), Lozito, McGuiness, Morris, Lynch, Duffell, Steffens, Stevens, Israel(Captain), Guarneri, Bender, Mullen, Lugano, Gallagher, Dimango, Carrig.
