= 1987 National Rugby Championships =

Rugby tournaments in the United States

Tournament details
- Tournament format(s): Various
- Date: 1987

Tournament statistics

Final

The 1987 National Rugby Championships were a series of tournaments organized to determine a national champion in several divisions for United States rugby teams. The divisions included Men's/Women's Club, college, high school, Military, Sevens, and Interterritorial.

== Men's Club ==
The 1987 National Club Rugby Championship was sponsored by Michelob and took place at Pepin Rood Stadium of Tampa University in Florida from May 8–9. The teams featured in the tournament were the champions of the four sub unions of USARFU. The Old Blues rugby club of Berkeley, CA won the title for the seventh time. Gary Townsend of Old Blues was MVP.

Regional Semifinal
April 25 - Vancouver, WA
Old Blues	25
Old Puget Sound Beach	3
April 25 - Vancouver, WA
Los Angeles	25
BATS	3
April 25 - Conshohocken, PA
Life Chiropractic	22
Beacon Hill	6
April 25 - Conshohocken, PA
Washington	22
Norfolk Blues	18
April 25 - Pittsburgh, PA
Pittsburgh	10
Louisville	9
April 25 - Pittsburgh, PA
Milwaukee	32
Chicago Lions	16
April 25 - Dallas, TX
Denver Barbarians	28
Kansas University	7
April 25 - Dallas, TX
Dallas Harlequins	23
Albuquerque Aardvarks	6

Regional Final
April 26 - Vancouver, WA
Old Blues	20
Los Angeles	10
April 26 - Conshohocken, PA
Life Chiropractic	13
Washington	6
April 26 - Pittsburgh, PA
Pittsburgh	16
Milwaukee	14
April 26 - Dallas, TX
Denver Barbarians	12
Dallas Harlequins	10

National Semifinal
May 8 - Tampa, FL
Old Blues	21
Life Chiropractic	9
May 8 - Tampa, FL
Pittsburgh	22
Denver Barbarians	21

National Final
May 9 - Tampa, FL
Old Blues	28
Pittsburgh	10
Third place
May 9 - Tampa, FL
Life Chiropractic	15
Denver Barbarians	6

=== Semifinals ===
8 May 1987
6:30PM

Pittsburgh	22–21	Denver Barbarians
Try: Lee Goodman 10' c Mark Carrozza 44'; Con: Jack McGannon (1/2); Pen: Tom Croskey 56', 77', 80'; Drop: Joe Klimowicz 29'		Try: Steve LaPorta 49' c Con: Mike DeJong (1/1); Pen: Mike DeJong (5)

Pepin Rood Stadium, Tampa, FL
Referee: Don Reardon (USARFU)

8 May 1987

Old Blues	21–9	Life College
Try: Matt Taylor 26' c Moses Smiliai c Con: Gary Townsend (2/2); Pen: Gary Townsend (3)		Pen: Colin Moore 12', ?', 34'

Pepin Rood Stadium, Tampa, FL
Referee: Ian Nixon (USA)

=== Third place ===
9 May 1987

Life College	15–6	Denver Barbarians
Try: Jim Louro; Tony Poole; Tony Poole; Drop: Mark Daniel 60'		Pen: Mike DeJong (2)

Pepin Rood Stadium, Tampa, FL
Referee: Don Reardon (USARFU)

=== Final ===
9 May 1987

Berkeley Old Blues	28–10	Pittsburgh
Try: Tim O'Brien c Stanley Lolohea c Mark Bass; Con: Gary Townsend (2/3); Pen: Gary Townsend (4)		Try: Jack McGammon; Pen: Tom Croskey (2)

Pepin Rood Stadium, Tampa, FL
Referee: Ian Nixon (USARFU)

Champions: Old Blues
Staff: Whit Everett (Coach), Dave Bateman (Coach), Mr. Goldenburg (President)
Captain: John Everett
Roster: Mark Bass (Flanker), John Blackburn (Flanker), Mark Carlson (#8), Steve Ellis (Center), John Everett (Hooker), Sam Havili (Lock), Brian Hillesland (Lock), Greg Hulbert (Lock), Don James (Prop), Stanley Lolahea (Flanker), Rob Mascheroni (Wing), Mike McClintock (Hooker), Bo Meyersieck (Flyhalf), Ken Meyersieck (Scrumhalf), Dave Mogni (Center), Dave Morze (Lock), Tim O'Brien (Center), Ramon Samaniego (Scrumhalf), Moses Similai (Center), Todd Stone (Wing), Matt Taylor (Wing), Gary Townsend (Fullback), Brian Walgenbach (Prop), Art Ward (#8), Blane Warhurst (Flanker), Giles Wilson (Prop).

== Women's Club ==
The 1987 Women's National Rugby Championship was a tournament that took place at Robb Field on May 23–24 in San Diego, CA. Beantown won the title by defeating Florida State 6–4. The University of Minnesota took third place with a 34–0 win over Belmont Shore Land Sharks.

Quarter-finals
May 23 – San Diego, CA
Beantown	28
Colorado Old Girls	0
May 23 – San Diego, CA
Belmont Shore	8
Chicago	7
May 23 – San Diego, CA
Florida State	18
New Orleans Half Moons	0
May 23 – San Diego, CA
U. of Minnesota	8
Eugene Housewives	0

Semi-finals
May 23 – San Diego, CA
Beantown	12
Belmont Shore	4
May 23 – San Diego, CA
Florida State	24
Minnesota	0

Final
May 24 – San Diego, CA
Beantown	6
Florida State	4
Third place
May 24 – San Diego, CA
Minnesota	9
Belmont Shore	6

=== Final ===
24 May 1987
2:00PM

Beantown	6–4	Florida State
Try: Carmen Morrison 40' c Con: Margie McClure		Try: Karen Davis 38'

San Diego, CA
Attendance: 600
Referee: Ed Todd (NCRFU)

Champions: Beantown of Boston, MA
Roster: Flavin, Connors, Kimball, Kane, Thorley, Heffernan, Bridi, Rutkowski, Margie McClure, Mary Ellen Martin-Madden, Karen Keith, Onufry, Morrissey, Carmen Morrison, Keefe.

== College ==
The 1987 College championship was won by San Diego State. Air Force was runner-up.

== Military ==
The 1987 National Military Rugby Championship was a twenty team tournament that took place at Wright Patterson Air Force base in Dayton, OH from May 2–3 and was won by Pensacola Naval Air Station with a 40–0 win over the Davis Monthan Mandrills in the Club Division while The Mike Stephenson President's Fifteen won the Open Division defeating US Coast Guard Select 22–14 in the final. In the Chairman's Cup competition for kickers John Byzewski of Mike Stephensons won the drop kicking contest, and Mike Croy of Scott Air Force Base was the best place kicker.

Club Division

Standings											
Rank	Group A	Pld	W	L	T	F	A	WPI	FTB	FTC	CLA
1.	Wright-Patterson Jets	3	3	0	0	64	4	X	17:4	16:0	31:0
2.	Fort Benning	3	2	1	0	59	25	4:17	X	9:8	46:0
3.	Fort Carson	3	0	2	0	8	25	0:16	8:9	X	?
4.	Clark	3	0	2	0	0	77	0:31	0:46	?	X

Standings										
Rank	B+C	Pld	W	L	PEN	D-M	WP2	SCO	SEY	PAN
1.	Pensacola	3	3	0	X	X	40:0	46:0	X	38:0
2.	Davis Monthan Mandrills	3	3	0	X	X	29:0	21:0	40:0	X
3.	Wright Pat II	3	1	2	0:40	0:29	X	X	24-4	X
4.	Scott	3	0	2	0:46	0:21	X	X	X	X
5.	Seymore Johnson	3	0	2	X	0:40	4:24	X	X	X
6.	Panama Southcom	3	0	1	0:38	X	X	X	X	X

Standings								
Rank	Group D	Pld	W	L	CAM	FTL	HAW	FTH
1.	Camp Lejeune Misfits	3	3	0	X	7:0	20:10	41:0
2.	Fort Leavenworth	3	0	1	0:7	X	?	?
3.	Hawaii Marines	3	0	1	10:20	?	X	?
4.	Fort Hood	3	0	1	0:41	?	?	X

Standings											
Rank	Group E	Pld	W	L	T	F	A	FTC	CHE	CAM	TIN
1.	Fort Campbell	3	2	0	1	53	12	X	12:12	25:0	16:0
2.	Cherry Point	3	2	0	1	46	18	12:12	X	9:0	25:6
3.	Camp Pendleton	3	0	2	0	0	34	0:25	0:9	X	?
4.	Tinker	3	0	2	0	6	41	0:16	6:25	?	X

Standings										
Rank	Group F	Pld	W	L	F	A	HAW	FTS	USU	FTK
1.	Hawaii ORCHAS	3	2	1	28	20	X	10:16	12:0	6:4
2.	Fort Sill	3	2	1	24	32	16:10	X	0:22	8:0
3.	USUHS	3	1	1	22	12	0:12	22:0	X	?
4.	Fort Knox	3	0	2	4	14	4:6	0:8	?	X

Quarter-finals
May 3 – Dayton, OH
Pensacola	27
Fort Benning	0
May 3 – Dayton, OH
Camp Lejeune	21
Fort Campbell	0
May 3 – Dayton, OH
Davis Monthan	24
Cherry Point	8
May 3 – Dayton, OH
ORCHAS	9
Wright Patterson	3

Semi-finals
May 3 – Dayton, OH
Pensacola	10
Camp Lejeune	6
May 3 – Dayton, OH
Davis Monthan	19
ORCHAS	9

Final
May 3 – Dayton, OH
Pensacola	40
Davis Monthan	0

Open Division
The Mike Stephenson's President's Fifteen advanced to the championship match with wins of 36–4 against the combined team of Yuma/29 Palms and 40–0 against the Subic Bay Marines. The Coast Guard also made it to the final from its group with wins of 60–0 over Black Sheep and 44–0 over the combined team of Ellsworth/Lackland AFB.

Third place
Subic Bay Marines 18-4 Black Sheep

Championship
Mike Stephenson's President's Fifteen 22-14 Coast Guard

The 1987 Interservice Rugby Championship was held at Fort McNair in Washington D.C. from 12 to 13 September. The teams involved were select sides of each service branch. From these teams a selection was made to field the Combined Services Rugby team for tours.
Round robin

- Army 16–9 Navy
- Marines 9–3 Air Force
- Marines 9–8 Navy
- Army 21–4 Coast Guard
- Marines 22–0 Coast Guard
- Navy 16–7 Air Force
- Coast Guard 18–7 Air Force
- Army 28–3 Marines
- Air Force 26–13 Army
- Navy 15–6 Coast Guard

Third place

- Navy 12–0 Air Force

Championship

13 September 1987

Army	23–9	Marines
Try: Dan Fethiere; Mike Dell'Orco 66'; Nick Grosso 76' c Con: Dan Morrison; Pen: Dan Morrison ?', 5', 27'		Try: Jay Cripple c Con: Darrin Gonzalez; Pen: Darrin Gonzalez 10'

Fort McNair, Washington DC
Referee: Ed Browder

1. Army (4–1) 2. Marines (3–2) 3. Navy (3–2) 4. Air Force (1–4) 5. Coast Guard (1–3)

== Sevens ==
Club
The 1987 National Club Seven–a–side championship, was played at Lincoln Park at the Milwaukee Polo Grounds in Milwaukee, Wisconsin on 6 September as part of the 14th annual Labor Day tournament. There were eight teams featured which included two representatives from each of the four territorial unions. Akron and QC Irish qualified from the Midwest. Bethlehem and Duck Brothers qualified from the Eastern regional. Los Angeles and Old Puget Sound represented the Pacific Coast. Denver Barbarians and Oklahoma University represented the West. The Duck Brothers defeated the Denver Barbarians to win the championship. Old Puget Sound finished third. The MVPs were Will Brewington and Chris Doherty. The top two scorers were Mark Gaetjen with 26 points from 3 tries and 7 conversions and Will Brewington with 24 points from 6 tries.

First round:

- Old Puget Sound Beach 14–4 Bethlehem
- Denver Barbarians 26–6 Akron
- Los Angeles 24–10 Quad City Irish
- Duck Brothers 24–0 Oklahoma

Second round:

- Bethlehem 16–6 Akron
- Quad City Irish 16–6 Oklahoma
- Denver Barbarians 18–10 Old Puget Sound Beach
- Duck Brothers 24–6 Los Angeles

Third round:

- Oklahoma 14–6 Akron (Seventh place)
- Bethlehem 10–4 Quad City Irish (Fifth place)
- Old Puget Sound Beach 10–0 Los Angeles (Third place)

=== Final ===
6 September 1987

Duck Brothers	18–10	Denver Barbarians
Try: Will Brewington; Will Brewington; Chris Doherty; Will Brewington 42'; Con: Mark Gaetjen (1)		Try: John Scott; Mike DeJong c Con: Mike DeJong

Milwaukee, WI
Referee: Don Reordan

Champions: Duck Brothers
Coach: Tony Brown
Roster: Chris Albrittain (Prop), Will Brewington (Hooker), Chris Doherty (Center), Jeff Gaetjen (Hooker), Mark Gaetjen (Wing), Danny Parris (Scrumhalf), Charlie Wilkinson (Flyhalf), George Wilkinson (Center), Jimmy Wilkinson (Prop).

All Star
The 1987 National All-Star Sevens Rugby Tournament was an eight team tournament with two representatives from each territory. Similar to the ITTs, the other purpose of the tournament was to select members for the U.S. Eagles Seven–a–side team. The eight teams played two rounds of games and then were paired off in placement matches. This years tournament took place at Hi Corbett Field and Hi Corbett Annex in Tucson, AZ from 30 October to 1 November as part of the 13th Annual Michelob Continental Rugby Classic. The East II team won the final over the East I team. Pacific Coast I came in third.

First round:

- Midwest I 10–16 East II
- East I 26–4 Midwest II
- Pacific I 30–0 West II
- West I 18–4 Pacific II

Second round:

- Midwest I 24–6 West II
- Pacific II 28–0 Midwest II
- East II 10–4 Pacific I
- East I 22–12 West I

Third round:

- West II 18–10 Midwest II (Seventh place)
- Midwest I 4–0 Pacific II (Fifth place)
- Pacific I 12–0 West I (Third place)

=== Final ===
31 October 1987

East I	10–12	East II
Try: Herman Venske c Terrence Titus; Con: Herman Venske (1/2)		Try: Mike Siano c Joe Taranto c Con: Joe McCann (2/2)

Tucson, AZ
Referee: Don Reordan

Champions: East II
Coach: Emil Signes, Tony Brown
Roster: Joe Taranto (Union), Joe McCann (OMEX), Steve Burnham (MOB), Shaun Western (MOB), Rory Lewis (Washington), Jimmy Wilkinson (NOVA), Mike Siano (Philadelphia Whitemarsh), Miller (MOB), Chris Petrakes (MOB).

== ITT ==
The Inter Territorial Tournament involved the four regional rugby unions comprising the United States RFU: Pacific Coast RFU, Western RFU, Midwest RFU, and the Eastern Rugby Union. The region teams are formed with players selected from the sub regional rugby unions. Subsequently, the USA Eagles are selected from the four regional teams after the ITT concludes. In 1987 the tournament took place at Windhover Park in Schenectady, NY from May 23–25. The Pacific Coast Grizzlies won the tournament for the tenth time. The Pacific Coast RFU also won the Junior Tournament for players under the age of 25.

Results:

23 May 1987
2:00PM

Pacific	25–13	Western
Try: Dan Morrison c Sam Vaca c Dave Surdyka c Mike Murray; Con: Dan Morrison (3/4); Pen: Dan Morrison		Try: David Skidmore; Pen: Mike De Jong (3)

Schenectady, NY
Referee: Geohegan

23 May 1987
3:30PM

Eastern	23–3	Midwest
Try: Mac Miller; Lance Manga; Ken Thring; Steve Siano; Con: Will Finley 2 Drop: Will Finley		Pen: Tom Croskey

Schenectady, NY

24 May 1987

Pacific	17–15	Eastern
Try: John Mickel 17'; Todd Samet 54' c Jon Lee 75'; Con: Dan Morrison; Pen: Dan Morrison 62'		Try: J.R. Robbins c Con: Chris McGrath; Pen: Chris McGrath (2); Drop: Will Finley

Schenectady, NY
Referee: Leach

24 May 1987

Midwest	10–8	Western
Try: Dominick Ancona; Pen: Tom Croskey (2)		Try: Chuck McKeon; Doug Straehley

Schenectady, NY

25 May 1987
11:30PM

Pacific Coast	13–13	Midwest
Try: Bill Leversee; Pen: Dan Morrison (3)		Try: Mark Sawicki 20'; Pen: Jim Aston (2); Drop: Tom Croskey 34'

Schenectady, NY
Referee: Geohegan

25 May 1987
12:30PM

Western	14–0	Eastern
Try: Chuck McKeon; Jim Cook; Frank Kennedy; Con: Mike DeJong

Schenectady, NY

Champions: Pacific Coast Grizzlies
Staff: Mike Pitts (Manager/San Francisco), Bing Dawson (Coach/OMBAC)
Roster: Dave Bateman (Old Puget Sound), Bruce Bevirt (Santa Monica), Mark Carlson (Old Blues), Tom Constantine (Belmont Shore), Peter Deddeh (OMBAC), Jon Knutson (Old Puget Sound), Jon Lee (OMBAC), Bill Leversee (Belmont Shore), Rick Mayfield (Portland Pigs), Joe McGlinchey (Belmont Shore), John Mickel (Los Angeles), Tex Moore (Tucson Magpies), Randy Morris (Belmont Shore), Dan Morrison (San Francisco), Mike Murray (Los Angeles), Dave Ochs (OMBAC), Tim Peterson (San Francisco), Lee Rosen (Los Angeles), Ramon Samaniego (Old Blues), Todd Samet (San Francisco), Gary Stasco (OMBAC), Dave Surdyka (Los Angeles), Sam Vaca (San Francisco), Kurt Weyand (OMBAC), Barry Williams (Los Angeles).

Team		W	L	T
1	Pacific Coast Grizzlies	2	0	1
2	Midwest Thunderbirds	1	1	1
3	Western Mustangs	1	2	0
4	Eastern Colonials	1	2	0

Women's ITT
The first edition of the Women's ITT was played from January 31 to February 1 in Metarie, LA and held in conjunction with the Battle of New Orleans tournament. The Eastern RU won the championship.

Round one:

- East 16–10 West
- Midwest 10–3 Pacific Coast

Round two:

- East 8–3 Pacific Coast
- West 11–8 Midwest

Round three:

- East 4–4 Midwest
- Pacific Coast 19–6 West

Champions: Eastern RU
Coach: Kojm, Arnsdorff
Roster: Alhberg, Auger, Bowlin, Camp, Correira, Crowson, Dixey, Fahey, Flavin, Flores, Gowl, Hanawalt, Heffernan, Holmes, Jervey, Johnson, Maher, McClure, McFarren, Money, Morrison, Morrissey, Onufry, Orsini, Pace, Rutkowski, Sup, J. Watts, M. Watts.

== High School ==
The 1987 National High School Rugby Championship was an eight team tournament took place 16 May at the Fort Logan complex in Denver, CO. The Burlingame squad from California won the championship by defeating Highland of Salt Lake City in the final. Alamo City took third.

Quarter-finals
May 16 – Denver, CO
Burlingame	28
Regis	0
May 16 – Denver, CO
Alamo City	15
Doylesville	3
May 16 – Denver, CO
Highland	9
Arvada West	0
May 16 – Denver, CO
Langley

Semi-finals
May 16 – Denver, CO
Burlingame	28
Alamo City	9
May 16 – Denver, CO
Highland	10
Langley	6

Final
May 16 – Denver, CO
Burlingame	16
Highland	6
Third place
May 16 – Denver, CO
Alamo City	9
Langley	6

=== Final ===
16 May 1987

Burlingame	16–6	Highland
Try: Mohu Latu; Eric Tuipulotu; Con: Bachalet; Pen: Bachalet (2)

Denver, CO
