= 1991 National Rugby Championships =

Rugby union tournaments in the United States

Tournament details
- Tournament format(s): Various
- Date: 1991

Tournament statistics

Final

The 1991 National Rugby Championships were a series of tournaments organized by the United States RFU to determine a national champion in several divisions for United States rugby teams. The divisions included club, college, high school, military, sevens, and inter-territorial.

== Men's Club ==
The 1991 Steinlager/USA Rugby National Club Championship took place at Robb Field in San Diego, CA from May 11–12. The teams featured in the tournament were the champions of the four sub unions of USARFU. Old Mission Beach Athletic Club won its third national title in four years. Washington, also in their third appearance in four years, placed second. Fullback Paul Sheehy of Washington and OMBAC flanker Dennis Gonzalez were the MVPs.

Regional Semifinal
December 1 - Orlando, FL
Washington	17
Atlanta Renegades	9
December 1 - Orlando, FL
Life Chiropractic	23
Old Blue	10
November 10 - Indianapolis, IN
Chicago Lions	31
Pittsburgh	14
November 10 - Indianapolis, IN
Scioto Valley	24
Palmer	3
April 14 - Seattle, WA
OMBAC	36
San Francisco	0
April 14 - Seattle, WA
Belmont Shore	10
Golden Gate	4
April 27 - Dallas, TX
Dallas Harlequins	26
St. Louis Bombers	13
April 27 - Dallas, TX
Denver Highlanders	20
Denver Barbarians	19

Regional Final
December 2 - Orlando, FL
Washington	25
Life Chiropractic	22
November 11 - Indianapolis, IN
Chicago Lions	20
Scioto Valley	14
April 15 - Seattle, WA
OMBAC	13
Belmont Shore	3
April 28 - Dallas, TX
Dallas Harlequins	26
Denver Highlanders	0

National Semifinal
May 11 - San Diego, CA
Washington	21
Chicago Lions	17
May 11 - San Diego, CA
OMBAC	21
Dallas Harlequins	15

National Final
May 12 - San Diego, CA
OMBAC	12
Washington	9
Third place
May 12 - San Diego, CA
Dallas Harlequins	27
Chicago Lions	10

=== Semifinals ===
11 May 1991
12:00PM

Washington	21–17	Chicago Lions
Try: Chris Andres 32'; Rory Lewis 59'; Duane Lawson c Justin Wheeler; Con: Paul Sheehy; Pen: Clark Wagner 68'		Try: Jeff Simon 15'; Mark Santiago 42' c Tom Simon 75' c? Con: Kurt Beers; Pen: Kurt Beers 8'

San Diego, CA
Referee: Dave Head (SCRFU)

11 May 1991
2:00PM

OMBAC	21–15	Dallas Harlequins
Try: John Lee; Jason McVeigh; Tom Short; Jason McVeigh 65' c Con: Chris O'Brien (1/3); Pen: Jason McVeigh 8'		Try: Mike Waterman 75' c Mark Gale c Con: Mark Gale; Pen: Mark Gale 54'

San Diego, CA
Referee: Mark Binning (Potomac)

=== Third place ===
12 May 1991

Dallas Harlequins	27–10	Chicago Lions
Try: Pete Granholm 18' c Andy Crane 39' c Paul Unterkofler 50' c Andy Crane 56'; Willie Stewart 60'; Chip Henderson c Con: Paul Sheehy; Tim Cone; Pen: Paul Sheehy (3); Tim Cone 66'; Drop: Clark Wagner		Try: Scott Bush c Drop: Joe Clarkson (3)

San Diego, CA
Referee: George Gadjovich (Toronto)

=== Final ===
12 May 1991

OMBAC	12–9	Washington
Pen: Forster 25', 56', 78', 85'		Try: Paul Sheehy 46' c Con: Paul Sheehy; Pen: Paul Sheehy 39'

San Diego, CA
Attendance: 2000
Referee: Mark Binning

Champions: Old Mission Beach Athletic Club
Staff: Bing Dawson (Coach), Mr. Rolls
Captain: Mike Saunders (Scrumhalf)
Roster: Sean Allen (Hooker), Dave Crist (Center), Carl Crumpacker (Lock), Graham Downes (Prop), Jerry Fanning (Hooker), Steve Forster (Flyhalf), John Gibb (Scrumhalf), Dennis Gonzalez (Flanker), John Hastings (Prop), Matt Heasley (Center), Ben Hough (Flanker), Solo Komai (Flanker), Kevin Kujawa (Flanker), Jon Lee (Wing), Bill Leversee (Lock), Chris Lippert (Prop), Dave Long (Center), Gerald Lumkong (Center), Duncan Lumsden (Fullback), Simon Mathews (Fullback), Jason McVeigh (Flyhalf), Dennis Panish (Back), Mike Saunders (Scrumhalf), Tom Short (Wing), Brian Vizard (#8), John Wooley (Prop), Ron Zenker (Lock), Frank Zugovitz (Lock).

== Women's Club ==
The 1991 Women's National Rugby Championship was a tournament was played at Lee District Park in Alexandria, VA on May 25–26. Beantown won the title by defeating Florida State 19–0. Chicago took third place. New Orleans Halfmoon fullback Dr. Krista McFarren was named MVP.

Quarterfinals

25 May 1991

Beantown	W–L	Bay Area Shehawks

Alexandria, VA

25 May 1991

New Orleans Half Moons	28–6	Madison

Alexandria, VA

25 May 1991

Florida State	18–6	Berkeley All Blues

Alexandria, VA

25 May 1991

Chicago	25–0	Colorado Old Girls

Alexandria, VA

Semifinals

25 May 1991

Florida State	14–4	Chicago

Alexandria, VA

25 May 1991

Beantown	38–6	New Orleans Half Moons
Try: Jan Rutkowski; Kelly Craven; Joan Morrissey; Mary Sullivan 1H', 56'; Amy Westerman c Sue Robicheaux c Con: Amy Westerman (5)		Try: Krista McFarren

Alexandria, VA

Third place

26 May 1991

New Orleans Half Moons	10–4	Chicago
Try: Liz Faridnia; Lucy Smith; Con: Krista McFarren (1)

Alexandria, VA

=== Final ===
26 May 1991
3:00PM

Beantown	19–0	Florida State
Try: Mary Sullivan 16'; Laurie Spicer; Con: (1); Pen: Amy Westerman 8', 1H', 44'

Alexandria, VA
Referee: Ed Sorensen (East)

Lineups:
Beantown– Stevens, Connors, Kimball, Pendergast, Kane, Spicer, Gartner, Rutkowski, Connell, Dixey, Westerman, Craven, Morrissey, Newton, M. Sullivan.
Florida State– Fahey, V. Sullivan, Hill, Gamage, Kojm, Gibson, Sup, Godwin, Flores, Auger, Davis, Jervey, Orsini, Nicholson, Alley.

== College ==
The 1991 College championship was won by UC Berkeley for the eighth time with a win over Army. The College All–Star Championship was won by the Pacific Coast while the East was runner–up. Air Force won the inaugural Women's Collegiate Championship.

== Military ==
The 1991 Steinlager National Military Rugby Championship took place at Fort Benning in Columbus, GA from May 11–12 and was won by Pensacola with a 16–0 win over Eglin AFB. A 'Boot Division' was played by teams finishing second in their group and the Quantico Heartbreakers were the winners in that bracket. Tom Collins of Eglin, was Most Valuable back, and Sam Pelham of Pensacola, was Most Valuable forward.

Group stage

Standings					Scores			
Rank	Pool 1	Pld	W	L	PEN	QUA	LEW	WRI
1.	Pensacola	3	3	0	X	7:3	20:3	9:3
2.	Quantico	3	2	1	3:7	X	20:0	13:0
3.	Fort Lewis	3	1	2	3:20	0:20	X	15:6
4.	Wright Patterson	3	0	3	3:9	0:13	6:15	X

Standings					Scores			
Rank	Pool 2	Pld	W	L	USU	MID	BEN	LEO
1.	USUHS	3	3	0	X	23:6	21:6	28:0
2.	Midwest	3	2	1	6:23	X	6:3	10:0
3.	Fort Benning	3	1	2	6:21	3:6	X	19:9
4.	Leonard Wood	3	0	3	0:28	0:10	9:19	X

Standings					Scores			
Rank	Pool 3	Pld	W	L	PRE	FTS	SCO	SCO
1.	President's XV	3	3	0	X	17:0	32:3	X
2.	Davis Monthan	3	2	1	0:17	X	12:6	12:0
3.	Fort Sill	3	1	2	3:32	6:12	X	12:0
4.	Fort Polk	3	0	3	0:26	0:12	0:12	X

Standings					Scores			
Rank	Pool 4	W	L	T	EGL	BRA	LEJ	SEY
1.	Eglin AFB	3	0	0	X	16:3	12:6	28:0
2.	Fort Bragg	2	1	0	3:16	X	4:0	24:3
3.	Camp Lejeune	0	2	1	6:12	0:4	X	9:9
4.	Seymour Johnson	0	2	1	0:28	3:24	9:9	X

Boot Division

Semifinals
May 11 – Ft. Benning, GA
Davis Monthan	13
Fort Bragg	0
May 11 – Ft. Benning, GA
Quantico	W
Midwest	L

Final
May 12 – Ft. Benning, GA
Quantico	10
Davis Monthan	0

Championship bracket

Semifinals
May 11 – Ft. Benning, GA
Eglin	6
USUHS	3
May 11 – Ft. Benning, GA
Pensacola	6
President's XV	0

Final
May 12 – Ft. Benning, GA
Eglin	0
Pensacola	16

Championship

12 May 1991

Pensacola	16–0	Eglin AFB
Try: Jack McLaughlin c Barry Taylor 73'; Con: Mike Presnell; Pen: Mike Presnell; Drop: Mike Presnell

Fort Benning, GA

The 1991 Interservice Rugby Championship was held in Quantico, VA from 5 to 7 September. The teams involved were select sides of each service branch. From these teams a selection was made to field the Combined Services Rugby team for tours.

Round Robin						Scores				
Rank	Standings	Pld	W	L	T	AIR	COA	ARM	NAV	MAR
1.	Air Force	4	3	0	1	X	10:10	15:12	19:4	21:6
2.	Coast Guard	4	2	1	1	10:10	X	6:3	0:11	20:4
3.	Army	4	2	2	0	12:15	3:6	X	4:3	12:0
4.	Navy	4	1	2	1	4:19	11:0	3:4	X	6:6
5.	Marines	4	0	3	1	6:21	4:20	0:12	6:6	X

Wooden Spoon
Marines

Third place

7 September 1991

Army	15–0	Navy
Try: Neuman; Blockus; Stephenson 35'; Pen: Blockus 55'

Quantico, VA

Championship

7 September 1991

Coast Guard	24–12	Air Force
Try: Eric Dayton 1' c Bob Speer 20' c Tom Hickey 78' c Con: Eddie Nagle; Pen: Eddie Nagle 1H', 75'		Try: Tony Fay c Tom Collins c Con: Jeff Debusk

Quantico, VA
Referee: Ed Sorensen (EPRFU)

Lineups:
Coast Guard– Mike Rand (Coach), Sandie MacLeod (Trainer), John Long, Matt Sisson, Vito Roselli, Anthony Vogt (Dan MacLeod), Jerry Wilson, Gene Adgate, Tom Hickey, Pat DeQuattro, John Hickey, Chuck Elias, Bill Hucke, Craig Kohler, Eddie Nagle, Eric Dayton, Dennis Purcell (Robert Speers).
Air Force– Gabos, Coveno, Bachelor (Delanois), Gonyea, Gaines (Pearlstein), Baade, Hill, Beaufils, Hajosy, Jeff Debusk, Neely, Gregory, Tom Collins, Moad, Tony Fay.

== Sevens ==
Club
The 1991 National Club Sevens championship, was sponsored by Steinlager and played at Lee District Park in Alexandria, Virginia on 17–18 August. There were eight teams featured which included two representatives from each of the four territorial unions. Cleveland and Wisconsin qualified from the Midwest. Maryland Old Boys and Northern Virginia qualified from the East. Monterey Bay Rebels and Old Puget Sound Beach represented the Pacific Coast. Denver Barbarians and Kansas City Blues represented the West. Old Puget Sound Beach defeated Northern Virginia to win the championship. MOB finished third. Mike Telkamp of Old Puget Sound Beach was MVP.

Pool 1
First round

- OPSB 18–0 Cleveland
- NOVA 22–6 Denver Barbarians

Second round

- OPSB 19–0 NOVA
- Cleveland 25–6 Denver Barbarians

Third round

- OPSB 18–16 Denver Barbarians
- NOVA 22–6 Cleveland

Pool 2
First round

- MOB 24–0 Kansas City Blues
- Monterey Bay 12–12 Milwaukee

Second round

- MOB 22–10 Monterey Bay
- Kansas City Blues 32–0 Milwaukee

Third round

- MOB 24–6 Milwaukee
- Monterey Bay 12–6 Kansas City Blues

Consolation bracket
Semifinals

- Milwaukee 18–0 Cleveland
- Denver Barbarians 22–0 Kansas City Blues

Seventh place

- Cleveland 18–12 Kansas City Blues

Fifth place

- Denver Barbarians 16–12 (OT) Milwaukee

Championship bracket
Semifinals

18 August 1991

Old Puget Sound Beach	16–12	Monterey Bay Rebels
Try: Barry Sayler c Mike Telkamp c Con: Mike Telkamp		Try: Bruce Murphy c John Selle c Finau Puloka 81'; Con: Rod Caborn

Alexandria, VA

18 August 1991

Northern Virginia	24–10	Maryland Old Boys
Try: Charlie Wilkinson; Dixie Dean; Keith Trumps; Keith Trumps; Dan Daus		Try: Chris Petrakes; Steve Burnham c

Alexandria, VA

Third place

18 August 1991

Maryland Old Boys	22–4	Monterey Bay Rebels
Try: Vince Granger; Steve Burnham; Will Brewington; Vince Granger		Try: Bruce Murphy

Alexandria, VA

=== Final ===
18 August 1991

Old Puget Sound Beach	26–6	Northern Virginia
Try: Jon Knutson c Mike Telkamp c Mike Telkamp; Mike Telkamp; Ty Adams c Con: Mike Telkamp		Try: Keith Trumps c Con: Mark Fowler

Alexandria, VA
Referee: Mark Binning (USARFU)

Champions: Old Puget Sound Beach
Staff: Dick Smith (Owner), Chuck Depew (Manager)
Captain: Dave Dateman
Roster: Mike Housh, Jon Knutson, Ty Adams, Mike Telkamp, Finau Puloka, George Foster, David Carpenter, Jim Burgett, Barry Sayler.

All Star
The 1991 National All-Star Sevens Rugby Tournament was an eight team tournament with two representatives from each territory. Similar to the ITTs, the other purpose of the tournament was to select members for the U.S. Eagles Seven–a–side team. This years tournament took place at Lee District Park in Alexandria, VA from 17 to 18 August. The Pacific I team won the final 14–12 over the East I team. Midwest I came in third. Pacific center George Conahey was MVP.

Group A
First round

- Pacific I 18–10 West II
- Midwest I 16–4 East II

Second round

- Pacific I 24–0 East II
- Midwest I 38–4 West II

Third round

- Pacific I 18–12 Midwest I
- East II 20–0 West II

Group B
First round

- East I 26–0 Midwest II
- Pacific II 20–0 West I

Second round

- East I 14–6 Pacific II
- West I 28–0 Midwest II

Third round

- East I 22–6 West I
- Pacific II 15–10 Midwest II

Consolation bracket
Semifinals

- East II 36–0 Midwest II
- West I 30–6 West II

Seventh place

- Midwest II 18–13 West II

Fifth place

- East II 28–6 West I

Championship bracket
Semifinals

18 August 1991

Pacific I	18–10	Pacific II
Try: Rich Pearson c Mike Telkamp c George Conahey c Chris Williams c Con: Tommy Smith		Try: Dennis Gonzalez; Tom Short c Con: Salty Thompson

Alexandria, VA

18 August 1991

East I	12–4	Midwest I
Try: Rory Lewis; Mike Siano; Vinnie Brunetti		Try: Jason Fox

Alexandria, VA

Third place

18 August 1991

Midwest I	24–10	Pacific II
Try: Ron Flohre c Jason Fox c Thor Bolstad c Steve Jung c Con: Thor Bolstad		Try: Mike Moe; Gene Coughlin; Con: Mike Moe

Alexandria, VA

=== Final ===
18 August 1991

Pacific I	14–12	East I
Try: George Conahey; Rich Pearson; George Conahey c Con: Tommy Smith		Try: Mark Gaetjen c Tom Brewer c Con: Steve Siano

Alexandria, VA
Referee: Bob Loftus (USARFU)

Champions: Pacific Coast I
Coach: Tommy Smith
Roster: Dahlin, Chris Williams, Ben Hough, Wayne Chai, Tom Billups, Humphreys, Rich Pearson, Tom Short, Moe, George Conahey, Jon Hinkin.

== ITT ==
The Inter Territorial Tournament involved the four regional rugby unions comprising the United States RFU: Pacific Coast RFU, Western RFU, Midwest RFU, and the Eastern Rugby Union. The region teams are formed with players selected from the sub regional rugby unions. Subsequently, the USA Eagles are selected from the four regional teams after the ITT concludes. In 1991 the tournament took place at Wildewood Polo Field in Columbia, SC from May 25–27. The Eastern Colonials won the tournament with three wins. Pat Bolger was MVP.

Results:

25 May 1991
11:30AM

West	38–0	Midwest
Try: Mike Waterman; Hayward; DeJong; Frank Kennedy; Hayward; Mike Waterman; Robbie Robinson; Brannan Smoot c Con: DeJong (3)

Columbia, SC
Referee: Dave Head (USARFU)

25 May 1991
2:30PM

Pacific Coast	23–24	East
Try: Ben Hough 20' c Rich Schurfeld 60' c Shawn Lipman; Con: Chris O'Brien; Pen: Chris O'Brien 11', 1H', 42'		Try: Mark Pidcock 33' c J.R. Robbins c Con: Glenn Judge; Pen: Glenn Judge 1', 2H'; Drop: Glenn Judge 61', 63'

Columbia, SC
Referee: Don Reordan (USARFU)

26 May 1991
11:30AM

Pacific Coast	6–20	Midwest
Pen: Salty Thompson 22', 1H'		Try: Mark Paynard 33' c Chris Boston; Pat Bolger; Con: Thor Bolstad; Pen: Thor Bolstad 4', 62'

Columbia, SC
Referee: Jim Jeffers (USARFU)

26 May 1991
2:30PM

West	7–39	East

Columbia, SC
Referee: Bob Loftus (USARFU)

27 May 1991
10:30AM

West	15–29	Pacific Coast
Try: Mark Pederson 7' c Con: Bill Hayward; Pen: Bill Hayward 66', 75', 80'		Try: Ben Hough 14'; Chris O'Brien 52' c Rich Schurfeld 64' c Ramon Samaniego 68'; Chris O'Brien c Con: Chris O'Brien (2); George Conahey; Pen: Chris O'Brien 30'

Columbia, SC
Referee: Mark Binning (USARFU)

27 May 1991
1:30PM

East	24–21	Midwest
		Pen: Thor Bolstad 25'

Columbia, SC

Team		W	L	F	A
1	Eastern Colonials	3	0	87	51
2	Pacific Coast Grizzlies	1	2	58	59
3	Western Mustangs	1	2	60	68
4	Midwest Thunderbirds	1	2	41	68

Champions: East Colonials
Staff: Mr. Smith (Manager), Al Little (Coach)
Captain: Bob Clark-#8 (Boston)
Roster: Joe Burke-Center (Albany Knights), Jim Duffy-Lock (Washington), Rob Farley-Flanker (Philadelphia Whitemarsh), Steve Gootkind-Prop (Life College), Butch Horwath-Prop (Philadelphia Whitemarsh), Glenn Judge-Flyhalf (Hartford Wanderers), Jim Keller-Lock (NYAC), Reza Khalili-Flanker (Potomac AC), Jim King-Flanker (Old White), Gary Lambert-#8 (White Plains), John Lang–Wing (Pensacola), Rory Lewis-Wing (Washington), Marcus Maffei-Wing (Philadelphia Whitemarsh), Lance Manga-Prop (Philadelphia Whitemarsh), Greg McAllister-Fullback (Old Blue), Gerry McDonald-Prop (Washington), Alec Montgomery-Fullback (Mystic River), Mark Pidcock-Scrumhalf (Pensacola), Kim Pipkin-Prop (Columbia), J.R. Robbins–Hooker (Washington), Chris Schmidt–Lock (Chesapeake), Paul Sheehy-Fullback (Washington), Ed Simpson-Flanker (Old Blue), Allen Spriggs-Scrumhalf (Boca Raton), Tom Sullivan–Center (Washington), Kevin Swords–Lock (Beacon Hill), Jim Walier–Center (Old Blue).

Junior ITT
The 1991 Junior ITT tournament took place in Columbia, SC from May 25–27. The East won with a 3–0 record.

25 May 1991
10:00AM

West	11–32	Midwest
Try: Joe Fridkin; Robke; Pen: Coffman		Try: Mark Paca; Farrell; Lowe; Callum; Con: Russ Spalding (2); Pen: Russ Spalding (4)

Columbia, SC
Referee: Mark Binning (USARFU)

25 May 1991
1:00PM

Pacific Coast	9–20	East
Pen: Devon Diaz (3)		Try: Schor; Daniels; Pen: Cormac Kelly (3); Liles

Columbia, SC
Referee: Pierce Higgins (Canada)

26 May 1991
10:00AM

Pacific Coast	19–20	Midwest
Try: 2 Con: Moe; Pen: Devon Diaz (2); Moe		Try: Gosch; Ranalli penalty try Dave Canning; Con: 3

Columbia, SC
Referee: Dave Head (USARFU)

26 May 1991
1:00PM

West	22–23	East
Try: Van der Molen; Robke; Con: Brittain Coffman; Pen: Brittain Coffman (2)		Try: Augustine; Walsh; Kevin Gass; Con: Seymour; Pen: Seymour

Columbia, SC
Referee: Don Reordan

27 May 1991
9:00AM

West	13–31	Pacific Coast

Columbia, SC

27 May 1991
12:00PM

East	11–0	Midwest

Columbia, SC

Women's ITT
The fifth edition of the Women's ITT was played from February 2–3 in Tallahassee, FL. The tournament was won by the Pacific Coast with East in second and West was third.

2 February 1991

Pacific Coast	19–7	East
Try: Brenda Schumacher c Sandy Meredith; Con: Chris Harju; Pen: Chris Harju (3)		Try: Pam Heimann; Pen: Amy Westerman 10'

Tallahassee, FL

2 February 1991

West	9–4	Midwest
Try: Pam Proto c Con: Krista McFarren; Pen: Krista McFarren 24'		Try: Anita Coleman

Tallahassee, FL

2 February 1991

Pacific Coast	29–4	West
Try: Suna Kneisley 19'; Julie Thompson; Elise Huffer; Jen Crawford; Suna Kneisley 72' c Suna Kneisley 80'; Con: Jen Crawford; Pen: Andi Morrell 64'		Try: Krista McFarren

Tallahassee, FL

2 February 1991

East	13–4	Midwest
Try: Bebe Alley; Amy Westerman 79' c Con: Lori Utchel; Pen: Amy Westerman		Try: Cynthia Bystrak

Tallahassee, FL

3 February 1991

Pacific Coast	23–10	Midwest
Try: Jen Crawford; Brenda Schumacher c Elise Huffer; Con: Chris Harju; Pen: Chris Harju (3)		Try: Joyce Weeg 15'; Pen: Pat Standley (2)

Tallahassee, FL

3 February 1991

East	18–8	West
Try: Mary Sullivan 37'; Laura Johnson 41'; Mary Sullivan 52' c Amy Westerman 58'; Con: Lori Utchel		Try: Tracey Henderson; Pat Proto

Tallahassee, FL

== High School ==
The 1991 National High School Rugby Championship was an eight team tournament that took place from 17 to 18 May at the Lake Sullivan Sports Complex in Indianapolis, IN. The Highland squad from Utah won the championship by defeating Walter Whitman of Arlington in the final. The St. Louis Druids took third.

Quarterfinals

17 May 1991

Highland	17–0	Littleton
Try: Sifa Fihaki; Taylor Scalley; Rob Moe

Indianapolis, IN

17 May 1991

Walter Whitman	17–11	Redmond
Try: Antoine White (2)

Indianapolis, IN

17 May 1991

St. Louis Druids	4–0	Skyline
Try: Ryan Colombo

Indianapolis, IN

17 May 1991

Xavier	22–4	Ben Davis
Try: Dave Fryer (2); Rob MaGuire (2)

Indianapolis, IN

Consolation semifinals

18 May 1991

Skyline	30–10	Redmond
Try: Sean Brown; Con: Sean Brown (4); Pen: Sean Brown (2)

Indianapolis, IN

18 May 1991

Littleton	11–6	Ben Davis
Try: Dave Head; Nick Dumas; Pen: Jeff Rommel

Indianapolis, IN

Seventh place

18 May 1991

Redmond	11–4	Ben Davis
Try: David Neuenschwander; Jeff Backschies; Pen: Brent Nourse		Try: Chad Brewer

Indianapolis, IN

Fifth place

18 May 1991

Skyline	19–10	Littleton
Try: Ryan Boyack; Joe DuPaix; Tim Smith; Con: Sean Brown (2); Pen: Sean Brown		Try: Duffy Wall; John Adams; Con: Jeff Rommel (1)

Indianapolis, IN

Semifinals

18 May 1991

Highland	11–0	Xavier

Indianapolis, IN

18 May 1991

Walter Whitman	12–10	St. Louis Druids

Indianapolis, IN

Third place

18 May 1991

St. Louis Druids	13–8	Xavier
Try: Boland; Con: Todd Bruemer; Pen: Todd Bruemer		Try: Tim Riches; Mike Minardi

Indianapolis, IN

=== Final ===
18 May 1991
5:00PM

Highland	29–0	Walter Whitman
Try: Shane Peterson 3' c Ve'a Ofa 20' c Taylor Scalley; Paul Ellis; Sifa Fihaki c Con: Shane Peterson; Pen: Rob Moe 70'

Indianapolis, IN
Referee: Bill Terrill
