= 1989 National Rugby Championships =

Tournament details
- Tournament format(s): Various
- Date: 1989

Tournament statistics

Final

The 1989 National Rugby Championships were a series of tournaments organized to determine a national champion in several divisions for United States rugby teams. The divisions included Men's/Women's Club, college, high school, Military, Sevens, and Interterritorial.

== Men's Club ==
The 1989 National Club Rugby Championship was sponsored by Steinlager and took place at Englewood High School in Denver, CO from May 13–14. The teams featured in the tournament were the champions of the four sub unions of USARFU. The Old Mission Beach Athletic Club of San Diego, CA won the title for the second time by defeating Philadelphia Whitemarsh in the final. The host team, Denver Barbarians who were in their sixth national tournament placed third. Mike Siano of Whitemarsh was Most Valuable Forward and Mike Saunders of OMBAC was Most Valuable Back.

Regional Semifinal
April 23 - Long Beach, CA
OMBAC | 15
Old Blues | 9
April 23 - Long Beach, CA
Belmont Shore | 22
San Jose Seahawks | 3
April 29 - Boulder, CO
Denver Barbarians | 31
Kansas City Blues | 0
April 29 - Boulder, CO
Dallas Harlequins | 33
St. Louis Bombers | 9
April 29 - Minneapolis, MN
Milwaukee | 6
Cincinnati Wolfhounds | 3
April 29 - Minneapolis, MN
Eastside Banshees | 15
Akron | 8
April 22 - Conshohocken, PA
Philadelphia Whitemarsh | 34
Providence | 12
April 22 - Conshohocken, PA
Atlanta Renegades | 12
Old White | 3

Regional Final
April 24 - Long Beach, CA
OMBAC | 23
Belmont Shore | 21
April 30 - Boulder, CO
Denver Barbarians | 21
Dallas Harlequins | 9
April 30 - Minneapolis, MN
Milwaukee | 13
Eastside Banshees | 0
April 23 - Conshohocken, PA
Whitemarsh | 15
Atlanta Renegades | 12

National Semifinal
May 13 - Denver, CO
OMBAC | 27
Milwaukee | 12
May 13 - Denver, CO
Whitemarsh | 18
Denver Barbarians | 9

National Final
May 14 - Denver, CO
OMBAC | 19
Whitemarsh | 9
Third place
May 14 - Denver, CO
Denver Barbarians | 43
Milwaukee | 12

=== Semifinals ===
13 May 1989

| OMBAC | 27–12 | Milwaukee |
| Try: Kevin Higgins 71' c Jon Lee 75' c Steve Forster c Con: Steve Forster; Pen: Steve Forster 1', 35'; Drop: Steve Forster 10' | | Try: Rich Beckmann 14' c Con: Simon Bailey (1/1); Pen: Simon Bailey 50', 59' |

Denver, CO
Referee: Kieran Geoghegan

13 May 1989

| Philadelphia Whitemarsh | 18–9 | Denver Barbarians |
| Try: Mike Siano 72' c Marsh Pennington 77' c Con: Scott Lance (2/2); Pen: Scott Lance 19', 65' | | Pen: Mike DeJong 2H'; Drop: Mike DeJong 9', 2H' |

Denver, CO
Referee: Don Reordan

=== Third place ===
14 May 1989

| Denver Barbarians | 43–12 | Milwaukee |
| Try: Mark Smith c David Philpott; Greg Lang c Mark Smith c Dave Tresemer c Steve LaPorta c Con: Mike DeJong (4/5); David Philpott (1/1); Pen: Mike DeJong 2 Drop: Mike DeJong 60' | | Try: Sean Cummings c Con: Simon Bailey; Pen: Simon Bailey 1H', 49' |

Denver, CO
Referee: Kieran Geoghegan

=== Final ===
14 May 1989

| OMBAC | 19–9 | Philadelphia Whitemarsh |
| Try: Mike Saunders 33'; Pen: Steve Forster 8', 2H', 76', 80'; Drop: Steve Forster 26' | | Try: Mike Siano 47' c Con: Scott Lance; Pen: Scott Lance 13' |

Denver, CO
Referee: Don Reordan

Champions: Old Mission Beach Athletic Club
Staff: Bing Dawson (Coach), Mr. Rolls (Manager)
Captain: Mike Saunders (Scrumhalf)
Roster: Colin Cole (Scrumhalf), Rick Crivellone (Flanker), Pete Deddah (Flanker), Graham Downes (Prop), Steve Forster (Flyhalf), Dennis Gonzalez (Flanker), Kevin Higgins (Center), Ben Hough (Flanker), Mike Johnson (Wing), Peter Kuttel (Flanker), Jon Lee (Wing), Bill Leversee (Lock), Chris Lippert (Prop), Greg Lumping (Center), Duncan Lumsden (Wing), Charlie Montgomery (Fullback), Dennis Panish (Center), Dwayne Parker (Hooker), John Phillips (Flyhalf), Gary Stasco (Prop), Marty Trinkino (Hooker), Sam Vaka (Center), Brian Vizard (#8), Ron Zenker (Lock).

== Women's Club ==
The 1989 Women's National Rugby Championship was a tournament sponsored by Steinlager and was played at Lafreniere Park on May 27–28 in Metairie, LA. The Bay Area Shehawks won the title by defeating Florida State 9–4. Beantown took third place. The Shehawks scored the most points with 68 while the individual with the most tries was Mary Sullivan of Minnesota with 7. The MVP back was Shehawk scrumhalf Laura Burr and the MVP forward was Shehawk lock And Morrell.

Quarter-finals
May 27 – Metairie, LA
Bay Area Shehawks | 43
U of Colorado Rainbows | 0
May 27 – Metairie, LA
Beantown | 8
Chicago | 0
May 27 – Metairie, LA
Florida State | 8
U of Minnesota | 0
May 27 – Metairie, LA
Berkeley All Blues | 12
Colorado Old Girls | 0

Semi-finals
May 27 – Metairie, LA
Bay Area Shehawks | 13
Beantown | 9
May 27 – Metairie, LA
Florida State | 26
Berkeley All Blues | 6

Final
May 28 – Metairie, LA
Bay Area Shehawks | 9
Florida State | 4
Third place
May 28 – Metairie, LA
Beantown | 20
Berkeley All Blues | 15

Consolation Bracket

Semi-finals
May 27 – Metairie, LA
Chicago | 30
U of Colorado Rainbows | 4
May 27 – Metairie, LA
U of Minnesota | 29
Colorado Old Girls | 0

Fifth place
May 28 – Metairie, LA
Chicago | 0
Minnesota | 18
Seventh place
May 28 – Metairie, LA
Old Girls | 12
Rainbows | 4

Semifinals

27 May 1989

| Shehawks | 13–9 | Beantown |
| Try: Laura Karcher c Sandy Meredith; Con: Andi Morrell; Pen: Andi Morrell | | Try: Jan Rutkowski c Con: Madge McClure; Pen: Madge McClure |

Metairie, LA

27 May 1989

| Florida State | 26–6 | Berkeley All Blues |

Metairie, LA

=== Final ===
28 May 1989

| Shehawks | 9–4 | Florida State |
| Pen: Andi Morrell 23', 50', 58' | | Try: Kathy Flores |

Metairie, LA
Referee: Ed Browder (NERFU)

Lineups:
Bay Area Shehawks– Kathie Morrison (Coach), Linda Chevalier, Alexander, Jessie Roberts, Andi Morrell, Brenda Trobaugh, Marti Watts, Law, Barbara Bond (Captain), Laura Burr, Annie Misko, Leal, Laura Karcher, Sandy Meredith, Mauldin, Zdarko.
Florida State– Fahey, Sullivan, Hill, Kathy Kojm, Brown, Claire Sup, Morton, Kathy Flores (Captain), Mary Holmes, Alley, Cooper, Patty Jervey, Candi Orsini, Davis, Nicholson.

== College ==
The 1989 College championship was won by Air Force. Long Beach was runner-up. In the College All–Star tournament at Colorado Springs the Eastern All–Stars came in first, the Western took second and Pacific finished third ahead of the Midwest.

== Military ==
The 1989 National Military Rugby Championship was a tournament that featured sixteen teams in the Club division and six in the Open division. It took place at Wright Patterson Air Force base in Dayton, OH from May 9–14 and was won by Camp Lejeune Misfits with a 21–4 win over the Pensacola in the Club Division while the President's XV won the Open Division defeating the Hahn Panthers 28–7. A 'boot competition' was played by teams finishing third in their group and Fort Sill defeated Seymour Johnson 21–3 to win that honor. In the consolation bracket final Fort Sill defeated Seymour–Johnson 18–3. In the Open Division championship the President's XV defeated US Forces Europe 28–7. In the Chairman's Cup competition for kickers Mike Ferguson of the Marine Corps won the drop kicking contest, and Steve Lavoye of Davis–Monthan was the best place kicker.

Path to championship:
Camp Lejeune 6–4 Fort Sill
Camp Lejeune 29–7 F.E. Warren
Camp Legeune 6–0 Wright–Patterson

Path to final:
Pensacola 15–0 Seymour Johnson
Pensacola 15–4 USUHS
Pensacola 13–0 Fort Knox

Quarterfinals
May 14 – Dayton, OH
Camp Lejeune | 11
Fort Campbell | 6
May 14 – Dayton, OH
Camp Pendleton | L
Fort Bragg | W
May 14 – Dayton, OH
Pensacola | 8
Wright Patterson | 0
May 14 – Dayton, OH
Fort Benning | W
Davis Monthan | L

Semifinals
May 14 – Dayton, OH
Camp Lejeune | 24
Fort Bragg | 3
May 14 – Dayton, OH
Pensacola | 4
Fort Benning | 0

Final
May 14 – Dayton, OH
Camp Lejeune | 21
Pensacola | 4

=== Final ===
14 May 1989

| Camp Lejeune Misfits | 21–4 | Pensacola |
| Try: Glenn Graham 20' c Wally Bugler 50' c Glenn Graham 65' c Con: Brett Bowlin (3/3); Pen: Brett Bowlin 30' | | Try: 75' |

Dayton, OH
Referee: Ted Serfs (USN)

Lineups:
Camp Lejeune– Castagnero, Bugler, Brown, Phillips, Clapp, Haddad, Greenwood, Mathews, Hittman, Bowlin, Polk, Byzewski (Captain), Graham, Hobbs, Ferguson.
Pensacola– Shield, Sands, Dyer, Parks, Yeager, Kowaleski, Lien (Captain), Schuler, Johansen, Reese, Grahm, Bennett, Miller, Milo, Veazy.

The 1989 Interservice Rugby Championship was held at Fort McNair in Washington D.C. from 9–10 September. The teams involved were select sides of each service branch. From these teams a selection was made to field the Combined Services Rugby team for tours.
Round robin

- Navy 13-12 Marines
- Air Force 14–9 Coast Guard
- Coast Guard 16–12 Marines
- Army 24–16 Navy
- Marines 0–18 Air Force
- Coast Guard 18–13 Army
- Navy 27–7 Coast Guard
- Air Force 16–15 Army
- Army 20–0 Marines
- Air Force 12–12 Navy

Third place

- Coast Guard 23–7 Navy

Championship

10 September 1989

| Air Force | 31–0 | Army |
| Try: Tom Miller c Brent VanderPol c Joe Neely c Con: Mark Bissel; Pen: Mark Bissell (3); Drop: Mike Sergeant |

Fort McNair, Washington DC
Referee: Binning

1. Air Force (4–0–1) 2. Army (2–3) 3. Coast Guard (3–2) 4. Navy (2–1–1) 5. Marines (0–4)

== Sevens ==
=== Club ===
The 1989 National Club Seven–a–side championship, was played at Lee District Park in Alexandria, Virginia on August 26 in conjunction with the Potomac Ruggerfest. There were eight teams featured which included two representatives from each of the four territorial unions. Akron and Quad City Irish qualified from the Midwest. Maryland Old Boys and Northern Virginia qualified from the Eastern regional. OMBAC and Old Puget Sound Beach represented the Pacific Coast. Denver Barbarians and New Mexico Brujos represented the West. The Maryland Old Boys defeated Northern Virginia to win the championship. Denver Barbarians finished third. The teams played round robins in two groups of four teams each. The top two teams advanced to the semifinals.

Pool 1
First round

- OPSB 14–0 NM Brujos
- NOVA 14–10 QC Irish

Second round

- QC Irish 30–0 OPSB
- NOVA 18–4 NM Brujos

Third round

- NOVA 22–6 OPSB
- NM Brujos 16–10 QC Irish

Pool 2
First round

- Denver 16–12 OMBAC
- MOB 20–0 Akron

Second round

- Denver 24–4 Akron
- MOB 24–4 OMBAC

Third round

- MOB 22–6 Denver
- OMBAC 32–0 Akron

Semifinals

26 August 1989

| Northern Virginia | 20–4 | Denver Barbarians |
| Try: Dixie Dean 2', 1H', 7', 2H'; Keith Trumps 2H' | | Try: Adam Brickner 2H' |

Alexandria, VA

26 August 1989

| Maryland Old Boys | 18–10 | Old Puget Sound Beach |
| Try: Will Brewington 2' c Steve Burnham c Con: John Redmond | | Try: Dave Bateman; Dave Bateman c Con: Mike Telkamp |

Alexandria, VA

Consolation

26 August 1989

| Denver Barbarians | 18– | Old Puget Sound Beach |

Alexandria, VA

==== Final ====
26 August 1989

| Maryland Old Boys | 26–12 | Northern Virginia |
| Try: Chris Petrakes; Vince Granger 9', 14' c, 2H'; Will Brewington 15' c Con: John Redmond | | Try: David Dean 1H' c Mark Gaetjen 11' c Con: Mark Gaetjen |

Alexandria, VA
Attendance: 1500

Champions: Maryland Old Boys
Captain: Chris Petrakes
Roster: Vince Granger, Mark Benson, Shaun Western, Andy Truesdale, John Redmond, Steve Burnham, Mark Miller, Don Lawrence, Will Brewington.

=== All Star ===
The 1989 National All-Star Sevens Rugby Tournament was an eight team tournament with two representatives from each territory. Similar to the ITTs, the other purpose of the tournament was to select members for the U.S. Eagles Seven–a–side team. This years tournament took place at Lee District Park in Alexandria, Virginia on August 27 in conjunction with the Potomac Ruggerfest. The East I team won the final over the Pacific I team. Midwest I came in third.

Pool 1
First round

- East I 16–10 Midwest II
- West I – Pacific II

Second round

- East I 14–6 Pacific II
- West I – Midwest II

Third round

- East I 14–12 West I
- Pacific II – Midwest II

Pool 2
First round

- Pacific I 28–0 West II
- Midwest I – East II

Second round

- Pacific I 20–12 East II
- Midwest I – West II

Third round

- Pacific I 26–10 Midwest I
- West II – East II

Semifinals

27 August 1989

| East I | 22–12 | Midwest I |
| Try: Terrence Titus; Steve Siano; Paul Sheehy; Charlie Wilkinson; Con: Paul Sheehy (3) | | Try: Rich Schurfeld (2); Con: Thor Bolstad (2) |

Alexandria, VA

27 August 1989

| Pacific I | 14–12 | Pacific II |
| Try: Kevin Higgins c Chris O'Brien (2); Con: Chris O'Brien | | Try: John Duffy c Jon Finstuen c Con: Wilburt Thompson |

Alexandria, VA

Consolation

27 August 1989

| Midwest I | W–L | Pacific II |

Alexandria, VA

==== Final ====
26 August 1989

| East I | 34–6 | Pacific I |
| Try: Tom Brewer 4' c, 17' c Terrence Titus 5' c Rory Lewis c Chris Petrakes 15' c, 2H' c Con: Steve Siano | | Try: Gary Hein c Con: Chris O'Brien |

Alexandria, VA
Referee: Kieran Geoghegan (USARFU)

Champions: Eastern Colonials I
Staff: Bob Davis (Manager), Emil Signes (Coach)
Captain: Chris Petrakes (MOB)–Scrumhalf/Flyhalf
Roster: Jimmy Wilkinson (NOVA)–Prop, Terrence Titus (Philadelphia Whitemarsh)–Hook/Prop, Tom Brewer (Union)–Prop, Charlie Wilkinson (NOVA)–Flyhalf, Steve Siano (Philadelphia Whitemarsh)–Flyhalf/Center, Rory Lewis (Washington)–Wing, Mark Miller (MOB)–Prop, Will Brewington (MOB)–Hooker.

== ITT ==
The Inter Territorial Tournament involved the four regional rugby unions comprising the United States RFU: Pacific Coast RFU, Western RFU, Midwest RFU, and the Eastern Rugby Union. The region teams are formed with players selected from the sub regional rugby unions. Subsequently, the USA Eagles are selected from the four regional teams after the ITT concludes. In 1989 the tournament, sponsored by Steinlager, took place at Robb Field in San Diego, CA from May 27–29. The East and West tied for first. The MVP was Western #8 Dave Poquette.

Results:

27 May 1989
1:00PM

| Western | 18–12 | Eastern |
| Pen: Mike DeJong 3', 28', 46', 60', 2H', 80' | | Try: Mark Gaetjen 49' c Kevin Swords c Con: Hugh O'Neill |

San Diego, CA
Referee: Dave Head (SCRFU)

27 May 1989
3:00PM

| Pacific Coast | 31–7 | Midwest |
| Try: Barry Daily 22' c Tony Ridnell 30'; Barry Daily c Dennis Gonzalez c Gary Hein c Con: Chris O'Brien; Pen: Chris O'Brien | | Try: Rex Myers 3'; Pen: Dave Horton 26' |

San Diego, CA
Referee: Don Morrison (NERFU)

28 May 1989
1:00PM

| Eastern | 16–4 | Midwest |
| Try: Tom Sullivan 18' c Dave Robertson; Con: Paul Sheehy; Pen: Paul Sheehy 12', 25' | | Try: Ajax Williamson |

San Diego, CA
Referee: Jim Russell (ERRFU)

28 May 1989
3:00PM

| Pacific Coast | 18–23 | Western |
| Try: John Knutson 72' c Don James 75' c Con: Chris O'Brien; Pen: Chris O'Brien 29', 42' | | Try: David Tresemer 36'; Ron Laszewski 55'; Steve LaPorta 63' c Con: Mike DeJong; Pen: Mike DeJong 20', 1H', 1H' |

San Diego, CA
Referee: Kieran Geoghegan (NERFU)

29 May 1989
11:00AM

| Western | 17–21 | Midwest |
| Try: Mike Glass 48'; Jim Peters 65'; Pen: Mark Gale (3) | | Try: Rich Schurfeld c Kevin Moylan 75' c Con: Dave Horton (1); Tom Croskey (1); Pen: Dave Horton 18'; Drop: Dave Horton 4', 1H' |

San Diego, CA
Referee: Don Reordan (SCRFU)

29 May 1989
3:00PM

| Pacific Coast | 12–28 | Eastern |
| Try: Jon Lee c Con: Chris O'Brien; Pen: Chris O'Brien 9', 27' | | Try: Ed Simpson 46' c Mike Caulder 57'; Ed Simpson 65' c Joe Burke c Con: Allen Spriggs; Pen: Allen Spriggs 2', 73' |

San Diego, CA
Referee: George Gadjovich (Ontario RU)

| Team | | W | L | F | A |
|---|---|---|---|---|---|
| 1 | Eastern Colonials | 2 | 1 | 56 | 34 |
| 1 | Western Mustangs | 2 | 1 | 58 | 51 |
| 3 | Pacific Coast Grizzlies | 1 | 2 | 61 | 58 |
| 3 | Midwest Thunderbirds | 1 | 2 | 32 | 64 |

Junior ITT
The 1989 Junior ITT tournament took place at Robb Field in San Diego, CA from May 27–29. The Pacific Coast won for the fourth time in six years. Chris Williams of the Pacific Coast Junior Grizzlies was the MVP.

27 May 1989
9:00AM

| Eastern | 13–13 | Western |
| Try: Ed Stump; Brian Ketchem; Con: Jamie Sabatier (1); Pen: Jamie Sabatier | | Try: Rob Taute; Kevin Harder; Con: Andrew Seelaus (1); Pen: Andrew Seelaus |

San Diego, CA
Referee: Don Reordan (SCRFU)

27 May 1989
11:00AM

| Midwest | 23–19 | Pacific Coast |
| Try: Mike Curtis; Mike Law; Pat Calcagno c Con: Tony Konczak; Pen: Andrew Pikston (2); Tony Konczak | | Try: Chris Celsi; Chris Williams 46' c Rich Pearson c Con: King Holmes (1); Ian Sherman (1); Drop: Ian Sherman 76' |

San Diego, CA
Referee: Jim Russell (ERRFU)

28 May 1989
9:00AM

| Eastern | 37–0 | Midwest |
| Try: Roger Coleman c John Lamb (2); Jim Walier; Tom Brewer; Con: Mike Howell (1); Tim Lucca (3); Pen: Mike Howell (2); Tim Lucca (1) |

San Diego, CA
Referee: Dave Head (SCRFU)

28 May 1989
11:00AM

| Pacific Coast | 17–13 | Western |
| Try: Rodi Quitiquit 60'; Scott Barbour 75'; Pen: Simon Matthews; Drop: Ian Sherman (2) | | Try: Lee Cooke 1'; Bill Kirkelie 30' c Con: Paul King; Pen: Paul King |

San Diego, CA
Referee: George Gadjovich (Ontario RU)

29 May 1989
9:00AM

| Western | 22–18 | Midwest |
| Try: Shawn Loudenback; Bill Kirkelie; Tim Bohman c Con: Paul King (2); Pen: Paul King (2) | | Try: Mike Law; Mike Curtis; Ron Bowers; Mike Curtis; Con: Tony Konczak (1) |

San Diego, CA
Referee: Kieran Geoghegan (NERFU)

29 May 1989
1:00PM

| Pacific Coast | 25–14 | Eastern |
| Try: Chris Williams; Pat Cronin; Rodi Quitiquit c Chris Williams c Con: Scott Barbour (3); Pen: Scott Barbour | | Try: Mike Szymanski; Ed Stump; Jim Walier c Con: Jamie Sabatier |

San Diego, CA
Referee: Don Morrison (NERFU)

Champions: Pacific Coast Junior Grizzlies
Staff: Dave Briley (Coach), Hom (Trainer), Figone (Manager), Dr. Brewin (Coach), Dr. Toohey (Coach)
Captain: Rich Pearson–Center (UC Berkeley)
Roster: Scott Barbour-Flanker (Old Blues), Frank Bistrian-Lock (OMBAC), Chris Celsi-Wing (Old Blues), Henry Choi–Prop (Haggis), Pat Cronin-Fullback (CSU Chico), Dave DeMay-Flanker/#8 (Tucson Magpies), Matt Eshoo-Flanker (Santa Rosa), Chris Fiack-Wing (San Jose Seahawks), Doug Giles-#8 (San Francisco), King Holmes-Scrumhalf (Old Puget Sound), Alden Hough-Hooker (UC Santa Cruz), Greg Hulbert-Lock (Old Blues), Ryan Kelly-Flanker (Tucson Magpies), Gerard Lumkong-Center (OMBAC), Scot Marker-Lock (Las Vegas), Simon Matthews-Fullback/FH (U. Arizona), Dwight Pargee-Center (San Francisco), Rodi Quitiquit-Wing (Haggis), Mike Schneck-Hooker (San Jose Seahawks), Ian Sherman-Flyhalf (UC Davis), James Smith-Prop (UC Berkeley), John Velie-Scrumhalf (UC Berkeley), E.J. Wick-Prop (U. Arizona), Chris Williams–Wing (UC Berkeley).

Women's ITT
The third edition of the Women's ITT was played from January 28–29 in Metarie, LA and held in conjunction with the Battle of New Orleans tournament. The tournament ended in a three-way tie.

Round one:

- Pacific Coast 27–0 West
- Midwest 7–4 East

Round two:

- East 20–0 West
- Pacific Coast 18–6 Midwest

Round three:

- Midwest 21–0 West
- East 18–3 Pacific Coast

== High School ==
The 1989 National High School Rugby Championship was an eight team tournament took place 20 May at Cottonwood High School in Salt Lake City, UT. The Highland squad from Utah won the championship by defeating Burlingame of California in the final. Xavier of New York took third.

Quarter-finals
May 20 – Salt Lake City, UT
Highland (Salt Lake) | 15
Druids (St. Louis) | 0
May 20 – Salt Lake City, UT
Whitemarsh (Philadelphia) | 4
Overland (Aurora) | 0
May 20 – Salt Lake City, UT
Burlingame (California) | 22
West End (Fairfax) | 4
May 20 – Salt Lake City, UT
Xavier (New York) | 7
Liberty (Issaquah) | 4

Semi-finals
May 20 – Salt Lake City, UT
Highland | 28
Whitemarsh | 3
May 20 – Salt Lake City, UT
Burlingame | 14
Xavier | 12

Final
May 20 – Salt Lake City, UT
Highland | 14
Burlingame | 6
Third place
May 20 – Salt Lake City, UT
Xavier | 16
Whitemarsh | 6

Consolation
Liberty 22–15 West End
Druids 4–0 Overland

Seventh place

- West End 11–6 Overland

Fifth place

20 May 1989

| Liberty | 20–4 | Druids |
| Try: Brian Karolenko; Brian Treloggen; Brian Adams; Jim Roper (2) | | Try: Jeff Albrecht |

Salt Lake City, UT

Semifinals

20 May 1989

| Highland | 28–3 | Whitemarsh |
| Try: Paul Ellis 2' c Steve Ebert 13' c Siope Matakaiongo c Siope Matakaiongo 50'; Dave Parkin c Con: Derek Becker | | Pen: Michael Dougherty 15' |

Salt Lake City, UT
Referee: Herk Koranski (Western RFU)

20 May 1989

| Burlingame | 14–12 | Xavier |
| Try: Patrick Stein 32' c Jon Idiart 34'; Rick Lauese 38' c Con: Sione Mahoni | | Try: Jon Taglieri 6' c Sean Gillooley 28' c Con: Sean Lugano |

Salt Lake City, UT
Referee: Peter Buckley (PCRFU)

Third place

20 May 1989

| Xavier | 16–6 | Whitemarsh |
| Try: Andy Frank; Paul Denver; Joe McCarthy; Con: Sean Lugano (2) | | Try: David Breslin c Con: Michael Dougherty |

Salt Lake City, UT

=== Final ===
20 May 1989
5:00PM

| Highland | 14–6 | Burlingame |
| Try: Paul Ellis 19'; Kurt Hawes 23'; Siope Matakiongo c Con: Derek Becker | | Pen: Totoa Pohahau 5'; Sione Mahoni 39' |

Salt Lake City, UT
Attendance: 1500
Referee: Joel Diemer (Western RFU)

Lineups:
Highland– Larry Gelwix (Coach), Mason, Wilcox, Jensen, Goates, Hawes, Parkin, Ebert, Becker (Captain), Berg, Rogers, Ellis, Matakaiongo, Turketo, Adamson, Latu.
Burlingame– Mark Hoffmann (Coach), Sciandri, Bianchini, Benson, Clark, Monroe (Lipman), Quivy, Moli, Niu, Stein (Captain), Tonga (Vete), Fehoko (Bryan), Idiart, Pohahau, Lauese (Frost), Mahoni.
