= 1982 National Rugby Championships =

Series of tournaments

Tournament details
- Tournament format(s): Various
- Date: 1982

Tournament statistics

Final

The 1982 National Rugby Championships were a series of tournaments organized to determine a national champion in several divisions for United States rugby union teams. The divisions included Men's/Women's Club, college, high school, Military, Sevens, and Interterritorial.

== Men's Club ==
The 1982 National Club Rugby Championship took place in Palo Alto, California at Stanford University's Harry Maloney Field from May 15–16. The teams featured in the tournament were the champions of the four sub unions of USARFU. The Berkeley Old Blues won the title defeating Denver Barbarians in the final 36–7. Art Ward of Old Blues was MVP forward and Bill Armstrong of Old Blues was MVP back.

Regional Semifinal
April 24 - Long Beach, CA
Old Blues | 35
Old Puget SB | 9
April 24 - Long Beach, CA
Capitol | 8
Newport | 6
April 25 - Detroit, MI
Chicago Lions | 31
Westside Harlequins | 0
April 25 - Detroit, MI
Milwaukee | 14
Minneapolis | 9
April 16 - Las Cruces, NM
Denver Barbarians | 10
Dallas Harlequins | 0
April 16 - Las Cruces, NM
Kansas University | 20
St. Louis Falcons | 18
May 1 - Philadelphia, PA
Norfolk Blues | 11
Old Blue | 7
May 1 - Philadelphia, PA
Atlanta Renegades | 9
Northern Virginia | 6

Regional Final
April 25 - Long Beach, CA
Old Blues | 16
Capitol | 6
April 25 - Detroit, MI
Chicago Lions | 30
Milwaukee | 8
April 24 - Denver, CO
Denver Barbarians | 25
Kansas University | 21
May 2 - Philadelphia, PA
Norfolk Blues | 25
Atlanta Renegades | 11

National Semifinal
May 15 – Palo Alto, CA
Old Blues | 20
Chicago Lions | 15
May 15 – Palo Alto, CA
Denver Barbarians | 35
Norfolk Blues | 24

National Final
May 16 – Palo Alto, CA
Old Blues (CA) | 36
Denver Barbarians | 7
Third place
May 16 – Palo Alto, CA
Norfolk Blues | 20
Chicago Lions | 16

=== Semifinal ===
15 May 1982

| Denver Barbarians | 35–24 | Norfolk Blues |
| Try: Rohn Skillin 28' c Ken Glassmeyer; Doug Straehley 48' c Mike Williams 78' c Ken Glassmeyer; Con: Milt Bennett; Pen: Mike Williams 2'; Milt Bennett 30'; Milt Bennett | | Try: Mike Osborne12' c Mike Osborne 21' c Bob McCaughey c Con: Otis Purvis; Pen: Otis Purvis; Otis Purvis 60' |

Palo Alto, CA
Referee: Reordan

15 May 1982

| Old Blues | 20–15 | Chicago Lions |
| Try: Art Ward 37' c Bo Meyersieck 60'; Mark Richter; Con: Bill Armstrong; Pen: Bo Meyersieck 31'; Bill Armstrong 80' | | Try: Webb Vorys 86' c Con: Roger Castino; Pen: George Mostert 25'; George Mostert 43'; Roger Castino |

Palo Alto, CA
Referee: Nixon

=== Third place ===
16 May 1982

| Norfolk Blues | 20–16 | Chicago Lions |
| Try: Keith Wright ? Pen: Otis Purvis (4) | | Try: Paul McNaughton c Paul Pauluzzi; Con: Roger Castino; Pen: Roger Castino; Drop: Brian Mullery |

Palo Alto, CA
Referee: Reordan

=== Final ===
16 May 1982

| Old Blues | 36–7 | Denver Barbarians |
| Try: 12' Bill Armstrong; 20' Art Ward c 22' Art Ward; Lee Evans; 65' John Everett c Gary Bunce; Blane Warhurst; Mark Bass; Con: Ken Myersieck | | Try: Mike Williams; Pen: 13' Milt Bennett |

Palo Alto, CA
Referee: Nixon

Champions: Old Blues RFC of Berkeley, CA
Coach: Ron Mayes
Captain: Whit Everett (Flanker)
Roster: Bill Armstrong (Fullback), Rick Bailey (Prop), Mark Bass (Flanker), Dave Bateman (Scrumhalf), Jim Brazil (Prop), Gary Bunce (Wing), Mark Deaton (#8), John Dixon (Fullback), Lee Evans (Center), John Everett (Hooker), Roy Helu (Center), Chuck Hextrum (Lock), Bill Holsapple (Prop), Ken Meyersieck (Scrumhalf), Bo Meyersieck (Flyhalf), Tim O'Brien (Center), Mark Richter (Wing), Bruce Sorenson (Lock), Art Ward (#8), Blane Warhurst (Flanker), Jeff Westcott (Wing), Brad Williams (Lock).

== Women's Club ==
The 1982 Women's National Rugby Championship was a tournament that took place on May 29–30 in Oak Brook, Illinois. Beantown of Boston, MA won the championship with a 25–0 win over Chicago. Beantown advanced to the championship with a 44-0 quarterfinal win over San Jose SheHawks and a 20-4 semifinal triumph against Houston Heathen Hearts.

Quarter-finals
May 29 – Oakbrook, IL
Chicago | 26
New Orleans | 0
May 29 – Oakbrook, IL
Florida State | 6
Belmont Shore | 0
May 29 – Oakbrook, IL
Beantown | 44
San Jose She Hawks | 0
May 29 – Oakbrook, IL
Houston | 20
Wisconsin | 4

Semi-finals
May 29 – Oakbrook, IL
Chicago | 14
Florida State | 10
May 29 – Oakbrook, IL
Beantown | 20
Houston | 4

Final
May 30 – Oakbrook, IL
Chicago | 0
Beantown | 25
Third place
May 30 – Oakbrook, IL
Florida State | 4
Houston | 10

30 May 1982
3:00PM

| Chicago | 0–25 | Beantown |

Oakbrook, IL
Referee: Steve Cohen

All Tournament Team
Props– Morgan Whitehead (Chicago), Mary Moynahan (Beantown)
Hooker– Missy Bowers (Chicago)
Second Rows– Laurell Lockett (Beantown), Marti Ramos (Belmont Shore)
#8– Anne Fowler (Beantown)
Wing Forwards– Sharon Fields (Houston), Marcia Holtz (Wisconsin)
Flyhalf– Polly Foureman (Wisconsin)
Scrumhalf– Kathy Flores (Florida State)
Inside Center– Molly Perdue (Chicago)
Outside Center– Candi Orsini (Florida State)
Wings– Laura Agostini (Wisconsin), Vanessa Calabrese (Chicago)
Fullback– Sharon Jamison (Florida State)

== College ==
The 1982 College championship was won by University of California at Berkeley. Life Chiropractic was runner-up.

== Military ==
The 1982 Military Club Rugby Championship took place in Dayton, Ohio at Wright-Patterson Air Force Base from May 22–23 and was won by Camp Pendleton with a 12–0 win over Fort Benning.

Quarter-finals
May 22 - Dayton, OH
Wright Pat Jets | 6
Fort Polk | 30
May 22 - Dayton, OH
Camp Pendleton | 25
29 Palms | 4
May 22 - Dayton, OH
Fort Benning | 19
Fort Hood | 12
May 22 - Dayton, OH
USUHS | 9
Fort Bragg | 0

Semi-finals
May 23 - Dayton, OH
Fort Polk | 0
Camp Pendleton | 10
May 23 - Dayton, OH
Fort Benning | 7
USUHS | 6

Final
May 23 - Dayton, OH
Camp Pendleton | 12
Fort Benning | 0
Third place
May 23 - Dayton, OH

=== Championship ===
23 May 1982

| Camp Pendleton | 12–0 | Fort Benning |
| Try: 32' Danny McMillan; 49' Danny McMillan; 66' Mike Ferguson |

Dayton, OH

== Sevens ==
The 1982 National Sevens Rugby Tournament was hosted by the Hartford Wanderers and took place on June 20, 1982, at Sterling Field in West Hartford, Connecticut. The tournament was won by the Bethlehem Hooligans for the first time. On their way to the championship the Hooligans defeated the Hartford Banshees 24–6, Washington D.C. Exiles 26–12, Beacon Hill 12–0 and Albany Knickerbockers 20–6.

20 June 1982

| Bethlehem Hooligans | 26–22 | Duck Brothers |
| Try: 3 Pete Peluso; Bill Baker | | Try: 4 |

Hartford, CT

Champions: Bethlehem Hooligans
Coach: Emil Signes
Captain: George Yasso
Roster: Dave Karvosky (Forward), Bill Downing (Forward), Dave Priestas (Back), Brian Hoffert (Back), Tom Zeiner (Wing), Scott Walker, Pete Peluso (Wing), Bill Baker (Center).

== ITT ==
The Inter Territorial Tournament involved the four regional rugby unions comprising the United States RFU: Pacific Coast RFU, Western RFU, Midwest RFU, and the Eastern Rugby Union. The region teams are formed with players selected from the sub regional rugby unions. Subsequently, the USA Eagles are selected from the four regional teams after the ITT concludes. In 1982 the tournament took place in Oak Brook, IL from May 29–31 with the Pacific Coast RFU repeating as tournament champions. George Mostert of the Midwest was MVP back and Jay Hanson of the Pacific was MVP forward.
Results:

29 May 1982

| Pacific Coast | 28–0 | Western |
| Try: 24' Ian Gunn c 36' Roy Helu c 50' Peter Wood; Blane Warhurst; Tim O'Brien; John Fowler; Con: Ian Gunn |

Oakbrook, IL

29 May 1982

| Eastern | 10–16 | Midwest |
| Try: 54' Gary Lambert; Pen: 21', 25' Dick Cooke | | Try: 69' Jesse Lopez; Pen: 6', 28', 38' George Mostert; Drop: Paul McNaughton |

Oakbrook, IL

30 May 1982

| Eastern | 16–3 | Western |
| Try: Gary Lambert; Lin Walton c 71' Jack White c Con: Steve Siano | | Pen: Milt Bennett |

Oakbrook, IL

30 May 1982

| Midwest | 3–16 | Pacific Coast |
| Pen: 31' George Mostert | | Try: Tim O'Brien 66' c Whit Everett c 78' Denis Shanagher; Con: Bill Armstrong |

Oakbrook, IL

31 May 1982

| Midwest | 17–0 | Western |
| Try: 68' Bob Vaughn; 76' George Mostert; Pen: 12', 16', 65' George Mostert |

Oakbrook, IL

31 May 1982

| Eastern | 16–16 | Pacific Coast |
| Try: 50' Steve Siano; Pen: 37' Dick Cooke; Dick Cooke; 68' Dick Cooke; 74' Steve Siano | | Try: 24' Peter Wood; 31' Mike Purcell c 61' Ed Burlingham c Con: Bill Armstrong |

Oakbrook, IL

| Team | | W | L | T | F | A |
|---|---|---|---|---|---|---|
| 1 | Pacific Coast Grizzlies | 2 | 0 | 1 | 60 | 19 |
| 2 | Midwest Thunderbirds | 2 | 1 | 0 | 36 | 26 |
| 3 | Eastern Colonials | 1 | 1 | 1 | 42 | 35 |
| 4 | Western Mustangs | 0 | 3 | 0 | 3 | 61 |

== High School ==
1982 High School Championship Trophy

The 1982 National High School Rugby Championship took place in Palo Alto, California at Stanford University's Harry Maloney Field from May 14–15. Redwood High of Larkspur, CA repeated as champions after defeating Highland of Utah in the final.

Semi-finals
May 14 – Palo Alto, CA
Redwood | 10
Turlock | 3
May 14 – Palo Alto, CA
Highland | 25
Serra | 24

Final
May 15 – Palo Alto, CA
Redwood | 18
Highland | 3
Third place
May 15 – Palo Alto, CA
Turlock | 11
Serra | 0

=== Championship ===
15 May 1982

| Redwood | 18–3 | Highland |
| Try: Sean Tighe; Doug Giles; Ralph Venne; Pen: Dan Morrison (2) |

Palo Alto, CA

Champions: Redwood High
Coach: David Kirschoff
Roster: D. Shubin, Evan Frank, Ralf Venne, Jeff Davis, Don Morshead, Bob McHugh, Gordon Wright, B. Risch, Doug Giles, Tim Peterson, John Morken, Robert Salaber, Jeff Terry, Mark Barry, Frank Minenna, Scott Carter, Walter Friend, Peter Gordon, Bud Reilly, A. diSuvero, Ken Arciga, Pat Farley, Chris Matthews, J. Donovan, Sean Tighe, Ralph Salaber, Dan Morrison, Jeff Maier, Rich Coyle, C. Andrade, Jim Land, Rhim Fleischman, J. deTomasi, James Choulous, Matt Rubenstein, Pat Doyle, Mark MacQuarrie, Matt Eschoo.
