= 1988 National Rugby Championships =

US rugby union competition

Tournament details
- Tournament format(s): Various
- Date: 1988

Tournament statistics

Final

The 1988 National Rugby Championships were a series of tournaments organized to determine a national champion in several divisions for United States rugby teams. The divisions included men's/women's club, college, high school, military, sevens, and inter-territorial.

== Men's Club ==
The 1988 National Club Rugby Championship took place at Windhover Park in Albany, NY from May 14–15. The teams featured in the tournament were the champions of the four sub unions of USARFU. The Old Mission Beach Athletic Club of San Diego, CA won the title for the first time. OMBAC made it to the National championship by defeating seven-time winner Old Blues of Berkeley in the Pacific Coast Final. Washington placed third. Rick Crivellone of OMBAC was Most Valuable Forward and Mike Saunders of OMBAC was Most Valuable Back.

Regional Semifinal
April 16 - San Francisco, CA
OMBAC	19
San Francisco	15
April 16 - San Francisco, CA
Old Blues	23
Belmont Shores	3
April 30 - Kansas City, MO
Denver Barbarians	20
Dallas Harlequins	10
April 30 - Kansas City, MO
Boulder	32
Oklahoma University	11
April 30 - Chicago, IL
Milwaukee	26
Pittsburgh	17
April 30 - Chicago, IL
Chicago Lions	30
Quad Cities Irish	12
April 23 - Conshohocken, PA
Washington	19
Life Chiropractic	7
April 23 - Conshohocken, PA
Boston	12
Atlanta Renegades	7

Regional Final
April 17 - San Francisco, CA
OMBAC	28
Old Blues	16
May 1 - Kansas City, MO
Denver Barbarians	26
Boulder	9
May 1 - Chicago, IL
Milwaukee	22
Chicago Lions	7
April 24 - Conshohocken, PA
Washington	15
Boston	12

National Semifinal
May 14 - Albany, NY
OMBAC	29
Denver Barbarians	16
May 14 - Albany, NY
Milwaukee	21
Washington	9

National Final
May 15 - Albany, NY
OMBAC	29
Milwaukee	12
Third place
May 15 - Albany, NY
Washington	39
Denver Barbarians	0

=== Semifinals ===
14 May 1988
2:00PM

OMBAC	29–16	Denver Barbarians
Try: Mike Johnson 13'; Dave Ochs 17' c Jon Lee; Sam Vaka c John Phillips c Con: John Phillips (3/5); Drop: John Phillips 75'		Try: Steve LaPorta 33' c Dave Poquette 70'; Con: Mike DeJong (1/2); Pen: Mike DeJong 8', 19'

Windhover Park, Albany, NY
Referee: Don Morrison (USARFU)

14 May 1988
3:40PM

Milwaukee	21–7	Washington
Try: Simon Bailey 27' c Simon Bailey 84' c Con: Simon Bailey (2/2); Pen: Simon Bailey 15', 47'; Drop: Rich Beckman 60'		Try: Rory Lewis 40' c Con: Bill Bernhard (1/1); Pen: Bill Berhard 57'

Windhover Park, Albany, NY
Referee: Don Reordan (USARFU)

=== Third place ===
15 May 1988
12:30PM

Washington	39–0	Denver Barbarians
Try: Chris Aherne 1' c Clark Wagner 30'; Paul Unterkofler c Bill Berhard 45'; Willie Stewart 50' c Paul Unterkofler 72'; JR Robbins 76' c Con: Bill Bernhard; Pen: Bill Bernhard 25'; Drop: Mark Daniel 60'

Windhover Park, Albany, NY
Referee: Don Morrison (USARFU)

=== Final ===
15 May 1988
2:00PM

OMBAC	29–12	Milwaukee
Try: John Phillips 2'; Kevin Higgins 27'; Jon Lee 50' c Mike Johnson c Con: Charlie Montgomery (2/4); Pen: John Phillips ?', 19'; Charlie Montgomery 44'		Pen: Simon Bailey 21', 39', ?', 55'

Windhover Park, Albany, NY
Attendance: 500
Referee: Don Reordan (USA)

Champions: Old Mission Beach Athletic Club
Staff: Bing Dawson (Coach), Pat Boyl (President)
Captain: Mike Saunders (Scrumhalf)
Roster: Colin Cole (Flyhalf), Rick Crivellone (Flanker), Carl Crumpacker (Lock), Pete Deddeh (Flanker), John DeWitt (Fullback), Graham Downes (Prop), Dave Granfors (Flanker), Johnn Hastings (Prop), Kevin Higgins (Center), Mike Johnson (Wing), Jon Lee (Wing), Pat Lenihan (Fullback), Bill Leversee (Lock), Roger Mein (Flanker), Charles Montgomery (Fullback), Dave Ochs (Prop), Dennis Panish (Center), Dwayne Parker (Hooker), John Phillips (Flyhalf), Gary Stasco (Prop), Sam Vaka (Center), Warren Van Zyl (Center), Brian Vizard (#8), Kent Weyand (Hooker).

== Women's Club ==
The 1988 Women's National Rugby Championship was a tournament was played on May 28–29 in Naperville, IL. The University of Minnesota won the title by defeating Florida State 18–0. Beantown took third place. University of Minnesota scrumhalf Tracey Diedrich was MVP.

Quarter-finals
May 28 – Naperville, IL
Minnesota	44
Colorado Old Girls	0
May 28 – Naperville, IL
Beantown
Bay Area Shehawks
May 28 – Naperville, IL
Florida State	16
Berkeley All–Blues	9
May 28 – Naperville, IL
Chicago
New Orleans Halfmoons

Semi-finals
May 28 – Naperville, IL
Minnesota	13
Beantown	10
May 28 – Naperville, IL
Florida State	8
Chicago	4

Final
May 29 – Naperville, IL
Minnesota	18
Florida State	0
Third place
May 29 – Naperville, IL
Beantown
Chicago

=== Final ===
29 May 1988
2:00PM

Minnesota	18–0	Florida State
Try: Lynn Wild; Tracey Diedrich (2); Pen: Christie Nixon (2)

Naperville, IL

Champions: University of Minnesota

== College ==
The 1988 College championship was won by California. Dartmouth was runner-up.

== Military ==
The 1988 National Military Rugby Championship was a twenty–seven team tournament in two divisions that took place at Wright Patterson Air Force base in Dayton, OH from May 11–15 and was won by Camp Lejeune Misfits with a 23–10 win over the Davis Monthan Mandrills in the Club Division while Pensacola Old Boys won the Open Division defeating The Mike Stephenson's President's XV 16–6 in the final. A 'boot competition' was played by teams finishing third in their group and Camp Pendleton were the winners among them. In the Chairman's Cup competition for kickers Bourke Milligan of Pensacola won the drop kicking contest, and Brett Bowlin of Camp Lejeune was the best place kicker.

Path to championship:
Camp Lejeune 18–6 Wright-Patterson AFB
Camp Lejeune 10–0 Camp Pendleton
Camp Legeune 17–7 Fort Carson
Camp Lejeune 12–4 Pensacola

Path to final:
Davis Monthan 12–6 Hawaii ORCAS
Davis Monthan 11–0 Fort Leonard Wood
Davis Monthan 18–0 Fort Bragg
Davis Monthan 6–4 Fort Campbell
Davis Monthan 10–0 Fort Sill

=== Final ===
15 May 1988

Camp Lejeune Misfits	23–10	Davis Monthan Mandrills
Try: Wally Bugler; William Clap; Studevant; Anthony Lazare; Con: Brett Bowlin (2/4); Pen: Brett Bowlin		Try: Steve LaVoye; Pen: Steve LaVoye (2)

Dayton, OH
Referee: Gloeckner

The 1988 Interservice Rugby Championship was held at Fort McNair in Washington D.C. from 10 to 11 September. The teams involved were select sides of each service branch. From these teams a selection was made to field the Combined Services Rugby team for tours.
Round robin

- Coast Guard 19–0 Navy
- Marines 29–0 Army
- Navy 16–6 Marines
- Coast Guard 4–0 Air Force
- Marines 13–9 Air Force
- Navy 14–12 Army
- Air Force 27–11 Army
- Marines 17–7 Coast Guard
- Coast Guard 10–0 Army
- Air Force 6–0 Navy

Third place

- Navy 13–12 Air Force

Championship

11 September 1988

Marines	22–16	Coast Guard
Try: Paul Bretz 33' c Brian McKeon 65'; J.R. Reed c Con: Wally Bugler; Brett Bowlin; Pen: Brett Bowlin 25', 42'		Try: Mark Riley 5'; Ed Nagle 30' c Con: Jake Korn; Pen: Jake Korn 40', 47'

Fort McNair, Washington DC
Referee: Ed Sorenson (EPRU)

1. Marines (4–1) 2. Coast Guard (3–2) 3. Navy (3–2) 4. Air Force (2–3) 5. Army (0–4)

== Sevens ==
Club
The 1988 National Club Seven–a–side championship, was played at the Milwaukee Polo Grounds in Milwaukee, Wisconsin on 4 September. There were eight teams featured which included two representatives from each of the four territorial unions. Akron and QC Irish qualified from the Midwest. Maryland Old Boys and Duck Brothers qualified from the Eastern regional. Santa Cruz Rebels and Old Puget Sound represented the Pacific Coast. Denver Barbarians and Dallas Reds represented the West. Old Puget Sound defeated the Denver Barbarians to win the championship. Duck Brothers finished third. The leading scorer was Pete Wood of Akron with 20 points from 5 tries.

First round:

- Old Puget Sound Beach 8–6 Akron
- Denver Barbarians W–L Dallas Reds
- Duck Brothers W–L Quad City Irish
- Maryland Old Boys 16–0 Santa Cruz Rebels

Second round:

- Old Puget Sound 20–6 Duck Brothers
- Denver Barbarians W–L Maryland Old Boys
- Quad City Irish 18–6 Santa Cruz Rebels
- Akron 24–0 Dallas Reds

Third round:

- Santa Cruz Rebels 18–0 Dallas Reds (Seventh place)
- Akron 12–4 Quad City Irish (Fifth place)
- Duck Brothers W–L Maryland Old Boys (Third place)

=== Final ===
4 September 1988

Old Puget Sound	19–6	Denver Barbarians

Milwaukee, WI

Champions: Old Puget Sound
Coach: Jeff Docter
Roster: David Bateman, Jon Knutson, Ty Adams, Mike Telkamp, Tony Ridnell, George Foster, David Carpenter, Jay Herron, Mathew Pleis. Chuck Depew.

All Star
The 1988 National All-Star Sevens Rugby Tournament was an eight team tournament with two representatives from each territory. Similar to the ITTs, the other purpose of the tournament was to select members for the U.S. Eagles Seven–a–side team. This years tournament took place at Hi Corbett Field in Tucson, AZ on 5 November as part of the 14th Annual Michelob Continental Rugby Classic. The East A team won the final over the Pacific B team. East B came in third.

First round:

- Pacific A 28–0 Midwest B
- East B 18–0 West A
- East A 30–0 West B
- Midwest A 22–10 Pacific B

Second round:

- Midwest B 32–4 West A
- East B 28–6 Pacific A
- West B 20–14 Midwest A
- Pacific B 28–0 East A

Third round:

- East B 22–8 Midwest B
- Pacific A 22–16 West A
- Pacific B 22–6 West B
- East A 36–0 Midwest A

Consolation semifinals:

- West B 22–8 Midwest B
- West A 28–6 Midwest A

Consolation final
West A 32–6 West B

Third place
East B 16–10 Pacific A

=== Semifinals ===
5 November 1988

Pacific B	16–4	East B
Try: Dennis Panish; Mark Gordon; Chris O'Brien; Con: Chris O'Brien (2/3)		Try: Dave Studevant

Tucson, AZ

5 November 1988

East A	14–10	Pacific A
Try: Joe Taranto (2); Rory Lewis; Con: (1/3)		Try: Chris Celsi; Tony Ridnell; Con: (1/2)

Tucson, AZ

=== Final ===
5 November 1988

East A	26–12	Pacific B
Try: Rory Lewis c Rory Lewis c Terrence Titus c Bill Fisher; Terrence Titus; Con: Will Brewington (3/5)		Try: Dave Bateman c Eric Whitaker c Con: Chris O'Brien (2/2)

Tucson, AZ
Referee: Don Morrison

Champions: East A
Coach: Emil Signes, Mr. Davis, Mr. Betzler
Roster: Paul Sheehy, Freutenberg, Brewer, Will Brewington, Rory Lewis, Charlie Wilkinson, Dave Karovski, Miller, Bill Fisher.

== ITT ==
The Inter Territorial Tournament involved the four regional rugby unions comprising the United States RFU: Pacific Coast RFU, Western RFU, Midwest RFU, and the Eastern Rugby Union. The region teams are formed with players selected from the sub regional rugby unions. Subsequently, the USA Eagles are selected from the four regional teams after the ITT concludes. In 1988 the tournament took place at Windhover Park in Schenectady, NY from May 28–30. The Pacific Coast Grizzlies won the tournament for the eleventh time.

Results:

28 May 1988

Pacific	23–13	Eastern
Try: Mike Saunders 5' c Mark Williams 11'; Mark Williams 53'; Tim O'Brien c Con: Chris O'Brien (2/4); Pen: Chris O'Brien 15'		Try: Joe McCann 40'; Pen: Carlos Balbe 25', 30', 60'

Schenectady, NY
Referee: Don Reordan (USARFU)

28 May 1988

Western	24–16	Midwest
Try: Mike Glass 13' c Mike Glass 25' c Mike Glass 44' c Steve Siano; Con: Bill Hayward; Pen: Bill Hayward 4', 20'		Try: Cecil Youngblood; Kevin Kavanaugh 47' c Con: Ian Talbot; Pen: Ian Talbot; Drop: John Call 65'

Schenectady, NY
Referee: Allan Piggott (Ontario RFU)

29 May 1988

Pacific	40–13	Midwest
Try: Mike Smith 8' c Mike Smith 21' c Barry Williams 40'; Dan Morrison 55' c Barry Williams 64' c Kevin Higgins c Con: Ray Nelson (5/6); Pen: Ray Nelson 3', 33'		Try: Cecil Youngblood 38' c Rex Myers; Con: Ian Talbot (1/2); Pen: Ian Talbot

Schenectady, NY
Referee: Kieran Geoghegen (USARFU)

29 May 1988

Western	25–16	Eastern
Try: Mike Glass 18'; Steve LaPorta 57' c Steve LaPorta c Con: Mike DeJong; Pen: Mike DeJong (2)		Try: Jerry Malina 70'; Pen: Bill Bernhard 3

Schenectady, NY
Referee: Dave Head (PCRFU)

30 May 1988

Pacific Coast	21–13	Western
Try: Mike Smith 23' c Tim O'Brien 40' c Kevin Higgins 72' c Con: Chris O'Brien (3/3); Pen: Chris O'Brien 59'		Try: Mike Glass 80'; Pen: Bill Hayward ?', 26', 62'

Schenectady, NY
Referee: Don Morrison (USARFU)

30 May 1988

Eastern	30–12	Midwest
Try: Kevin Swords c Gary Lambert c Alec Montgomery c Sam Moreau c Con: Bill Bernhard; Pen: Bill Bernhard; Drop: Bill Bernhard		Try: Sean Madden c Con: Sean Madden; Pen: John Call 2

Schenectady, NY
Referee: Jim Russell (WRFU)

Champions: Pacific Coast Grizzlies
Coach: Bing Dawson
Roster: Rick Crivellone-Lock (OMBAC), Tony Flay-Hooker (Old Puget Sound), Kevin Higgins-Center (OMBAC), King Holmes-Scrumhalf (Old Puget Sound), Don James-Prop (Los Angeles), Jon Knutson-Center (Old Puget Sound), Bill Leversee-Lock (OMBAC), Shawn Lipman-Flanker (Santa Monica), Chris Lippert-Prop (OMBAC), Rick Mayfield-Flanker (Portland), Dan Morrison-Flyhalf (San Francisco), Ray Nelson-Fullback (Los Angeles), Joe Nickerson-Prop (Old Puget Sound), Chris O'Brien-Flyhalf (Hawaii Harlequins), Tim O'Brien-Center (Old Blues), Jeff Peter-#8 (Santa Monica), Tim Peterson-Prop (San Francisco), Mike Purcell-Wing (BATS), Tony Ridnell-Lock (Old Puget Sound), Al Robertson-Lock (Old Puget Sound), Mike Saunders-Scrumhalf (OMBAC), Mike Smith-Wing (Old Blues), Dave Surdyka-Flanker (Los Angeles), Brian Vizard-#8 (OMBAC), Kent Weyand-Hooker (OMBAC), Barry Williams-Wing (Los Angeles), Mark Williams-Center (Santa Monica).

Team		W	L	F	A
1	Pacific Coast Grizzlies	3	0	84	39
2	Western Mustangs	2	1	62	53
3	Eastern Colonials	1	2	59	60
4	Midwest Thunderbirds	0	3	41	94

Junior ITT
The 1988 Junior ITT tournament took place at Windhover Park in Schenectady, NY from May 28–30. The Pacific won for the third time in five years.

28 May 1988

Pacific Coast	23–16	East
Try: Dean Klisura; John Wilmore c Brian Walgenbach c Con: Steve Forster; Pen: Steve Forster 10'		Try: Jim Walier 27'; Pen: John Lockwood 15', 23', 35'; Drop: John Lockwood 58'

Schenectady, NY
Referee: Jim Russell (WRFU)

28 May 1988

West	27–9	Midwest
Try: John Finstuen 11' c Greg Goodyear 45' c John Finstuer c Con: Paul King; Pen: Paul King 73'; Drop: Paul King 53'		Try: Jon Lonsert c Con: Tony Konczak; Pen: Tony Konczak 6'

Schenectady, NY
Referee: Dave Head (PCRFU)

29 May 1988

Pacific Coast	17–0	Midwest
Try: John Wilmore 38'; Rob Salabar 39' c Eric Whitaker; Con: Steve Forster; Pen: Steve Forster 47'

Schenectady, NY
Referee: Don Morrison (USARFU)

29 May 1988

West	25–17	East
Try: Greg Silva 20' c Finstuen; Finstuen c Con: Randy Carder; Pen: Randy Carder 30', 57', 2H'		Try: Greg Snyder 29' c Terrance McCullion; Jim Walier; Con: Tim Lucca; Pen: Tim Lucca 50'

Schenectady, NY
Referee: Don Reordan (USARFU)

30 May 1988

Pacific Coast	21–0	West
Try: Ramon Samaniego 20' c Chris Celsi 21' c Colin Cole 70' c Con: Steve Forster; Pen: Steve Forster

Schenectady, NY
Referee: Kieran Geoghegan (USARFU)

30 May 1988

Midwest	21–10	East
Try: M. Williamson 30' c Jon Lonsert c Con: Tony Konczak; Pen: Tony Konczak 4', 15', 46'		Try: Tom Brewer 66'; Pen: John Lockwood 38', 40'

Schenectady, NY
Referee: Allen Piggott

Champions: Pacific Coast Junior Grizzlies
Coaches: Briley, Hastings, Spinella, Waldron
Captains: Dwayne Parker–Hooker (OMBAC), John Wilmore–#8 (Back Bay)
Roster: Sean Allen-Hooker (San Diego State), Jay Boyle-Fullback (Tucson Magpies), Chris Celsi-Wing (Los Angeles), Colin Cole–Flyhalf (OMBAC), Dave DeMay-Lock (Arizona U.), Jim Dreyfuss-Prop (Santa Monica), Merrick Firestone-Center (Tucson Magpies), Steve Forster-Flyhalf (San Diego State), Doug Giles-#8 (San Francisco), Dennis Gonzales-Flanker (San Diego State), John Hastings-Prop (OMBAC), Ben Hough-Flanker (UC Santa Cruz), Greg Hulbert-Lock (Old Blues), Ryan Kelly-Flanker (Arizona U.), Dean Klisura-Wing (Old Blues), Dennis Panish-Center (OMBAC), Robert Salabar-Fullback (Old Blues), Ramon Samaniego-Scrumhalf (Old Blues), Tony Samaniego-Scrumhalf (Old Aztecs), Greg Stoehr-Flanker (Old Blues), John Tellenbach-Fullback (UC San Diego), Chuck Tunnacliffe-Lock (Belmont Shore), Brian Walgenbach-Prop (Old Blues), Eric Whitaker-Wing (St. Mary's).

Women's ITT
The second edition of the Women's ITT was played from January 30–31 in Metarie, LA and held in conjunction with the Battle of New Orleans tournament. The tournament ended in a three-way tie.

Round one:

- Pacific Coast 7–3 East
- Midwest 14–3 West

Round two:

- East 11–3 Midwest
- Pacific Coast 22–0 West

Round three:

- East 22–3 West
- Midwest 15–4 Pacific Coast

== High School ==
The 1988 National High School Rugby Championship was an eight team tournament took place 21 May at the Fort Logan complex in Washington, DC. The Highland squad from Utah won the championship by defeating Burlingame of California in the final. Doylestown of Pennsylvania took third.

Quarter-finals
May 21 – Washington, DC
Highland (Salt Lake)	26
North Penn (Philadelphia)	0
May 21 – Washington, DC
Langley (Virginia)	4
Alamo City (San Antonio)	0
May 21 – Washington, DC
Burlingame (California)	17
Xavier (New York)	13
May 21 – Washington, DC
Doylestown (Pennsylvania)	7
Regis (Denver)	4

Semi-finals
May 21 – Washington, DC
Highland	30
Langley	0
May 21 – Washington, DC
Burlingame	16
Doylestown	6

Final
May 21 – Washington, DC
Highland	24
Burlingame	0
Third place
May 21 – Washington, DC
Doylestown	12
Langley	0

Seventh place

- Xavier 37–0 North Penn

Fifth place

- Regis 6–3 Alamo City

=== Final ===
21 May 1988

Highland	24–0	Burlingame
Try: Brett Harris 5' c Mark Holstrom 20'; Sione Latu; Mike Moe 50' c Mark Conn 65' c Con: Mike Moe

Washington, DC
Referee: Koranski

Rosters:
Highland– Mike Oifanakis (Prop), Shane Siatanga (Hooker), Mike Marriott (Prop), Justin Hawes (Lock), David Young (Lock), Mark Holmstrom (Flanker), Steve Jones (Flanker), Brett Harris (#8), Paul Brinton (Scrumhalf), Mike Moe (Flyhalf), Sione Lau (Wing), Glen Hubert (Center), Siope Hafoka (Center), Mark Conn (Wing), Matt Parkin (Fullback).
Burlingame– Marcus Tongamoa (Prop), Jamie Bianchini (Hooker), Tony Penterio (Prop), Matt Mason (Lock), Darren Guion (Lock), Shane Quivey (Flanker), Fred Faivuilo (Flanker), Viliami Mahoni (#8), Anore Bachelet (Scrumhalf), Isi Fehoko (Flyhalf), Jim Gough (Wing), Adrian Mansbridge (Center), Ian Gurll (Center), James Vere (Wing), John Eke (Fullback).
