= National Collegiate Rugby Championship =

This is a list of results and records for the USA Rugby National Collegiate Men's Rugby Championships, which began in 1980. The 1984–1988 and 1990 editions were played in conjunction with the Annual Pebble Beach Rugby Classic. In 2010, several of the top college teams agreed to form the College Premier League, now known as Division 1-A Rugby to begin play in spring 2011. This list does not include records from the breakaway invitational Varsity Cup Championship held between 2013 and 2017, nor from the rival National Collegiate Rugby Organization's D1 championship that began in 2021.

== Performances ==
=== Championship results ===
Tournament names

- 1980–2011: "National Collegiate Championship"
- 2011–present: "Division 1-A"

Ed.	Season	Champion	Runner-Up	Third / Semi-finalists	Fourth	Location	Match Report
1	1980	California	Air Force	Illinois	Navy	Davenport, Iowa	
2	1981	California	Harvard	Miami, Ohio	Kansas State	Dayton, Ohio	
3	1982	California	Life University	Michigan^{i}	New Mexico State.	Greeley, Colo.	
4	1983	California	Air Force	Navy	Illinois	Athens, Ga.	
5	1984	Harvard	Colorado	Long Beach	Miami, Ohio	Pebble Beach, Calif.	
6	1985	California	Maryland	Colorado	Illinois	Pebble Beach, Calif.	
7	1986	California	Dartmouth	Air Force	Bowling Green	Pebble Beach, Calif.	
8	1987	San Diego State	Air Force	Bowling Green	Dartmouth	Pebble Beach, Calif.	
9	1988	California	Dartmouth	Air Force	Bowling Green	Pebble Beach, Calif.	
10	1989	Air Force	Long Beach	Army	Penn State	Colorado Springs, Colo.	
11	1990	Air Force	Army	Ohio State	Long Beach	Pebble Beach, Calif.	
12	1991	California	Army	Ohio State	Wyoming	Houston, Tex.	
13	1992	California	Army	Air Force	Penn State	Colorado Springs, Colo.	
14	1993	California	Air Force	Harvard	Wisconsin	Houston, TX	
15	1994	California	Navy	Air Force	Penn State	Dufour Stadium, Catholic University, D.C.	
16	1995	California	Air Force	Penn State	Army	Berkeley, CA	
17	1996	California	Penn State	Stanford	Navy	Colorado Springs, CO	
18	1997	California	Penn State	UC Davis	Stanford	Witter Rugby Field, Berkeley, Calif.	
19	1998	California	Stanford	Navy	IUP	Balboa Park, San Francisco, CA	
20	1999	California	Penn State	Navy	Army	Balboa Park, San Francisco, CA	
21	2000	California	Wyoming	Army	IUP	Tampa, FL	
22	2001	California	Penn State	Navy	Army	Virginia Beach, VA	
23	2002	California	Utah	Army	Wyoming	Virginia Beach, VA	
24	2003	Air Force	Harvard	California	Army	Steuber Rugby Stadium, Stanford, CA	
25	2004	California	Cal Poly-SLO	Air Force / Navy		Steuber Rugby Stadium, Stanford, CA	
26	2005	California	Utah	BYU / Navy		Steuber Rugby Stadium, Stanford, CA	
27	2006	California	BYU	Utah / Penn State		Steuber Rugby Stadium, Stanford, CA	
28	2007	California	BYU	Navy / Penn State		Steuber Rugby Stadium, Stanford, CA	
29	2008	California	BYU	St. Mary's / Colorado		Steuber Rugby Stadium, Stanford, CA	
30	2009	BYU	California	Army / San Diego State		Steuber Rugby Stadium, Stanford, CA	
31	2010	California	BYU	Arkansas State / Army		Steuber Rugby Stadium, Stanford, CA	
32	2011	California	BYU	Arkansas State / Utah		Rio Tinto Stadium, Sandy, UT	
33	2012	BYU	Arkansas State	Life / St. Mary's		Rio Tinto Stadium, Sandy, UT	
34	2013	Life	St. Mary's	Cal Poly SLO / Arkansas State		Greensboro, NC	
35	2014	St. Mary's	Life University	Arkansas State / Lindenwood		Steuber Rugby Stadium, Stanford, CA	
36	2015	St. Mary's	Life University	Lindenwood / Davenport		Kennesaw State University Stadium, Kennesaw, GA	
37	2016	Life	St. Mary's	Utah / Lindenwood		Moraga, CA	
38	2017	St. Mary's	Life University	Arizona / BYU		Moraga, CA	
39	2018	Life	California	Lindenwood / Penn State		Santa Clara, CA	
40	2019	Life	California	St. Mary's / Lindenwood		Stevens Stadium, Santa Clara, CA	
—N/a	2020	Not held					
—N/a	2021	Not held					
41	2022	Army	St. Mary's	California / Lindenwood		Houston, Tex.	
42	2023	Navy	California	BYU / Lindenwood		Houston, Tex.	
43	2024	St. Mary's	Navy	BYU / Life		Houston, Tex.	
44	2025	California	Life	St. Mary's / Lindenwood		Indianapolis, Ind.	
45	2026	California	Navy	St. Mary's / Life		Indianapolis, Ind.	

^{i} - Disqualified for using an ineligible player

=== Titles by University ===
National Championships by school
– 28 championships, – 4 championships, – 3 championships, – 2 championships, – 1 championships

Team	Titles won	Finals lost	Years won
California	28	4	1980, 1981, 1982, 1983, 1985, 1986, 1988, 1991, 1992, 1993, 1994, 1995, 1996, 1997, 1998, 1999, 2000, 2001, 2002, 2004, 2005, 2006, 2007, 2008, 2010, 2011, 2025, 2026
Life	4	5	2013, 2016, 2018, 2019
St. Mary's	4	3	2014, 2015, 2017, 2024
Air Force	3	5	1989, 1990, 2003
BYU	2	5	2009, 2012
Navy	1	3	2023
Army	1	3	2022
Harvard	1	2	1984
San Diego State	1	0	1987
Penn State	0	4	—N/a
Stanford	0	2	—N/a
Dartmouth	0	2	—N/a
Utah	0	2	—N/a
Colorado	0	1	—N/a
Maryland	0	1	—N/a
Long Beach	0	1	—N/a
Wyoming	0	1	—N/a
Cal Poly	0	1	—N/a
Arkansas State	0	1	—N/a

=== Finals appearances by state ===
State	Titles	University	Runners-up	University
California	33	California (28), St. Mary's (4), San Diego State (1)	11	California (4), St. Mary's (3), Stanford (2), Long Beach (1), Cal Poly-SLO (1)
(Georgia (U.S. state)) Georgia	4	Life University (4)	5	Life University (5)
Colorado	3	Air Force (3)	6	Air Force (5), Colorado (1)
Utah	2	BYU (2)	7	BYU (5), Utah (2)
Maryland	1	Navy (1)	4	Navy (3) Maryland (1)
(New York (state)) New York	1	Army (1)	3	Army (3)
Massachusetts	1	Harvard (1)	2	Harvard (2)
Pennsylvania	0		4	Penn State (4)
New Hampshire	0		2	Dartmouth (2)
Arkansas	0		1	Arkansas State (1)
Wyoming	0		1	Wyoming (1)

== Playoff Results ==
=== 1980s ===
1980

Quarter-finals
March 23 - Pebble Beach, CA
California	9
Santa Monica	7
April 6 - Blacksburg, VA
Navy	15
Army	6
May 4 - Lawrence, KS
Air Force
Northern Colorado
April - Dayton, OH
Illinois	7
Minnesota	6

Semi-finals
May 17 – Davenport, IA
California (Pacific)	15
Navy (East)	0
May 17 – Davenport, IA
Air Force (West)	15
Illinois (Midwest)	4

Final
May 18 – Davenport, IA
California	15
Air Force	9
Third place
May 18 – Davenport, IA
Illinois	10
Navy	0

1981

Quarter-finals
April 11 - Santa Barbara, CA
California	12
BYU	11
April 26 - Denver, CO
Kansas State	13
New Mexico State	11
April 12 - Blacksburg, VA
Harvard	26
Army	12
May 3 - Bowling Green, OH
Miami
Stevens Point

Semi-finals
May 9 – Dayton, OH
California (Pacific)	30
Kansas State (West)	15
May 9 – Dayton, OH
Harvard (East)	25
Miami (Midwest)	7

Final
May 10 – Dayton, OH
California	6
Harvard	3
Third place
May 10 – Dayton, OH
Miami	10
Kansas State	0

1982

Quarter-finals
April 11 - Santa Barbara, CA
California	16
UCLA	6
May 2 - Bowling Green, OH
Michigan	40
Bowling Green	7
April 12 - Princeton, NJ
Life College	21
Virginia Tech	4
April 24
New Mexico State	13
Kansas State	10

Semi-finals
May 8 – Greeley, CO
California (Pacific)	19
Michigan (Midwest)	8
May 8 – Greeley, CO
Life College (East)	34
New Mexico State (West)	11

Final
May 9 – Greeley, CO
California	15
Life College	14
Third place
May 9 – Greeley, CO
Michigan	26
New Mexico State	3

1983

Quarter-finals
April 10 - Provo, UT
California	44
BYU	6
May 1 - Bowling Green, OH
Illinois	7*
Palmer	10
April 24 - College Station, TX
Air Force	13
Oklahoma	9
Navy

Semi-finals
May 8 – Athens, GA
California (Pacific)	20
Illinois (Midwest)	0
May 8 – Athens, GA
Air Force (West)	6
Navy (East)	3

Final
May 9 – Athens, GA
California	13
Air Force	3
Third place
May 9 – Athens, GA
Navy	32
Illinois	3

*awarded due to ineligible players Sources:

1984

Regional Semifinal
April 28 - Conshohocken, PA
Harvard	39
Florida State	3
April 28 - Conshohocken, PA
VPI	10
Maryland	7
April 27 - Long Beach, CA
Long Beach	31
Oregon State	9
April 27 - Long Beach, CA
BYU	10
California	15
April 22 - Boulder, CO
Colorado	7
Kansas State	0
April 22 - Boulder, CO
New Mexico State	4
Air Force	7
April 28 - Muncie, IN
Miami	11
Bowling Green	7
April 28 - Muncie, IN
UW Stevens Point	18
Ball State	17

Regional Final
April 29 - Conshohocken, PA
Harvard	9
VPI	3
April 28 - Long Beach, CA
Long Beach	12
California	9
April 22 - Boulder, CO
Colorado	24
Air Force	5
April 29 - Muncie, IN
Miami	32
UW Stevens Point	6

National Semifinal
May 5 – Pebble Beach, CA
Harvard (East)	15
Long Beach (Pacific)	11
May 5 – Pebble Beach, CA
Colorado (West)	18
Miami (Midwest)	0

National Final
May 6 – Pebble Beach, CA
Harvard	12
Colorado	4
Third place
May 6 – Pebble Beach, CA
Long Beach	9
Miami	6

1985

Quarter-finals
April 27 - Corvallis, OR
California	18
Long Beach	12
April
Colorado
April 21 - Baton Rouge, LA
Maryland	16
Dartmouth	15
April 28 - Evanston, IL
Illinois	25
Wisconsin	12

Semi-finals
May 4 – Pebble Beach, CA
California (Pacific)	39
Colorado (West)	21
May 4 – Pebble Beach, CA
Maryland (East)	19
Illinois (Midwest)	14

Final
May 5 – Pebble Beach, CA
California	31
Maryland	6
Third place
May 5 – Pebble Beach, CA
Colorado	26
Illinois	8

1986

Quarter-finals
April 20 - Las Cruces, NM
Air Force	24
Kansas State	9
April 20 - Marietta, GA
Dartmouth	17
Virginia Tech	0
April 20 - Champaigne, IL
Bowling Green	7
Wisconsin	6
April 27 - Tucson, AZ
California	34
UCSB	9

Semi-finals
May 3 – Pebble Beach, CA
Air Force (West)	4
Dartmouth (East)	18
May 3 – Pebble Beach, CA
Bowling Green (Midwest)	14
California (Pacific)	31

Final
May 4 – Pebble Beach, CA
Dartmouth	4
California	6
Third place
May 4 – Pebble Beach, CA
Air Force	13
Bowling Green	9

1987

Quarter-finals
April 19 - Dayton, OH
Bowling Green	26
Kentucky	25
April 19 - Colorado Springs, CO
Air Force	19
Colorado	10
April 19
Dartmouth	6
Virginia Tech	3
April 11 - Santa Barbara, CA
San Diego State	23
California	12

Semi-finals
May 2 – Pebble Beach, CA
Bowling Green (Midwest)	8
Air Force (West)	15
May 2 – Pebble Beach, CA
Dartmouth (East)	6
San Diego State (Pacific)	22

Final
May 3 – Pebble Beach, CA
Air Force	9
San Diego State	10
Third place
May 3 – Pebble Beach, CA
Bowling Green	25
Dartmouth	7

1988

Semi-finals
April 30 – Pebble Beach, Calif.
California (Pacific)	19
Air Force (West)	10
April 30 – Pebble Beach, Calif.
Dartmouth (East)	25
Bowling Green (Midwest)	13

Final
May 1 – Pebble Beach, Calif.
California	9
Dartmouth	3
Third place
May 1 – Pebble Beach, Calif.
Air Force	32
Bowling Green	0

1989

Semi-finals
May 6 – Colorado Springs, Colo.
Air Force (West)	17
Army (East)	16
May 6 – Colorado Springs, Colo.
Long Beach (Pacific)	18
Penn State (Midwest)	9

Final
May 7 – Colorado Springs, Colo.
Air Force	25
Long Beach	7
Third place
May 7 – Colorado Springs, Colo.
Army	38
Penn State	10

=== 1990s ===
1990

Semi-finals
May 5 – Pebble Beach, Calif.
Air Force (West)	37
Ohio State (Midwest)	32
May 5 – Pebble Beach, Calif.
Long Beach (Pacific)	19
Army (East)	20

Final
May 6 – Pebble Beach, Calif.
Air Force	18
Army	12
Third place
May 6 – Pebble Beach, Calif.
Ohio State	7
Long Beach	3

1994

Semi-finals
May 7 – Dufour Stadium, Catholic University, D.C.
California
Air Force
May 7 – Dufour Stadium, Catholic University, D.C.
Navy
Penn State

Final
May 8 – Dufour Stadium, Catholic University, D.C.
California	27
Navy	13
Third place
May 8 – Dufour Stadium, Catholic University, D.C.
Air Force	24
Penn State	14

1995

Semi-finals
May – Berkeley, CA
California
Penn State
May – Berkeley, CA
Air Force	19
Army	18

Final
May – Berkeley, CA
California	48
Air Force	16
Third place
May – Berkeley, CA
Penn State
Army

1996

Semi-finals
May 4 – Colorado Springs, CO
California	32
Navy	15
May 4 – Colorado Springs, CO
Penn State	42
Stanford	29

Final
May 5 – Colorado Springs, CO
California	47
Penn State	6
Third place
May 5 – Colorado Springs, CO
Stanford
Navy

1997

Semi-finals
May 3 – Witter Rugby Field, Berkeley, CA
California	62
UC Davis	14
May 3 – Witter Rugby Field, Berkeley, CA
Penn State
Stanford

Final
California	41
Penn State	15
Third place
May 4 – Witter Rugby Field, Berkeley, CA
UC Davis	52
Stanford	31

1999

Semi-finals
May 2 – San Francisco, Calif.
California	50
Navy	17
May 2
Penn State	57
Army	20

Final
May 3 – Balboa Park, San Francisco, Calif.
California	36
Penn State	5
Third place
May 3 – Balboa Park, San Francisco, Calif.
Navy	44
Army	22

=== 2000s ===
2000

Semi-finals
May 6 – Tampa, FL
California	49
Army	19
May 6 – Tampa, FL
Wyoming	39
IUP	21

Final
May 7 – Tampa, FL
California	62
Wyoming	16
Third place
May 7 – Tampa, FL
Army	43
IUP	20

2001

Semi-finals
May 5 – Virginia Beach, VA
California	34
Navy	27
May 5 – Virginia Beach, VA
Penn State	27
Army	25

Final
May 6 – Virginia Beach, VA
California	86
Penn State	11
Third place
May 6 – Virginia Beach, VA
Navy	34
Army	22

2002

Semi-finals
May 4 – Virginia Beach, VA
California	53
Army	5
May 4 – Virginia Beach, VA
Utah	38
Wyoming	12

Final
May 5 – Virginia Beach, VA
California	43
Utah	22
Third place
May 5 – Virginia Beach, VA
Army
Wyoming

2003

Semi-finals
May 3 – Steuber Rugby Field, Stanford, CA
Air Force	46
California	28
May 3 – Steuber Rugby Field, Stanford, CA
Harvard	27
Army	26

Final
May 4 – Steuber Rugby Field, Stanford, CA
Air Force	45
Harvard	37
Third place
May 4 – Steuber Rugby Field, Stanford, CA
California
Army

2009

Round of 16 (April 17–18)
1	California	67
16	Minnesota	0
8	Cal Poly	61
9	Air Force	10
5	Penn State	26
12	Tennessee	12
13	Army	33
4	Saint Mary's	26
2	BYU	26
15	Dartmouth	5
7	Navy	50
10	Arkansas State	7
6	San Diego State	55
11	Bowling Green	12
14	Utah	47
3	LSU	5

Round of Eight (April 19)
1	California	76
8	Cal Poly	10
5	Penn State	19
13	Army	20
2	BYU	13
10	Arkansas State	3
6	San Diego State	44
3	LSU	30

Semifinal (May 1)
1	California	42
13	Army	17
2	BYU	31
6	San Diego State	13

National Championship Game (May 2)
1	California	22
2	BYU	25

=== 2010s ===
2010

Round of 16 (April 16)
1	BYU	33
16	Delaware	13
8	Arizona	25
9	Syracuse	20
5	Texas A&M	34
12	Utah	36
13	Tennessee	10
4	Army	46
2	California	65
15	UCLA	32
7	Penn State	31
10	LSU	25
6	Arkansas State	29
11	Saint Mary's	23
14	Bowling Green	15
3	San Diego State	32

Round of Eight (April 17)
1	BYU	46
8	Arizona	10
12	Utah	24
4	Army	31
2	California	61
7	Penn State	19
6	Arkansas State	17
3	San Diego State	10

Semifinal (April 30)
1	BYU	63
4	Army	28
2	California	83
6	Arkansas State	37

National Championship Game (May 1)
1	BYU	7
2	California	19

2011

Quarterfinals (May 7–8) @Higher Seed
W1	Brigham Young	64
E2	Navy	12
MS1	Arkansas State	30
PC2	St. Mary's (Calif.)	17
PC1	California	43
MS2	Life University	10
E1	Army	26
W2	Utah	32

Semi-Finals (May 14); Infinity Park, Glendale, Colo. ESPN3
W1	Brigham Young	36
MS1	Arkansas State	15
PC1	California	62
W2	Utah	14

Championship (May 21); Rio Tinto Stadium, Sandy, Utah; ESPN3/ESPNU
W1	Brigham Young	14
PC1	California	21

2012

Quarterfinals (May 5) @Higher Seed
W1	Brigham Young	103
PC2	UCLA	24
MS1	Life University	75
E2	Penn State	3
E1	Army	20
MS2	Arkansas State	36
PC1	Saint Mary's	24
W2	Utah	15

Semi-Finals (May 12); Location determined by Quarterfinal results
W1	Brigham Young	26
MS1	Life University	20
MS2	Arkansas State	31
PC1	Saint Mary's	17

Championship (May 19); Rio Tinto Stadium; Sandy, Utah; ESPN3
W1	Brigham Young	49
MS2	Arkansas State	42

2013

Quarterfinals (April 27) @ Higher Seed
Cal1	St. Mary's	65
W2	Colorado	25
W1	Colorado State	19
Cal2	Cal Poly SLO	40
M/S1	Arkansas State	31
East2	Kutztown	10
East1	Army	29
M/S2	Life University	55

Semi-Finals (May 4) @ Higher Seed
Cal1	St. Mary's	58
Cal2	Cal Poly SLO	24
M/S1	Arkansas State	13
M/S2	Life University	18

Final (May 18); Greensboro, NC; ESPN3/ESPNU
Cal1	St. Mary's	14
M/S2	Life University	16

2014

Quarterfinals (April 26) @ Higher Seed
St. Mary's	103
Santa Clara	10
Lindenwood	64
Davenport	32
Arkansas State	43
Cal Poly SLO	12
Life University	57
Colorado	3

Semifinals (May 3) @ Higher Seed
St. Mary's	72
Lindenwood	7
Arkansas State	27
Life University	34

Final (May 10); Stanford, Calif. USA Rugby TV
St. Mary's	21
Life University	6

2015

Quarterfinals (April 25)
M1	Life	64
E2	Penn State	3
W1	Air Force	12
M3	Lindenwood	59
E1	Army	24
M2	Davenport	50
C1	St. Mary's	72
Utah	26

Semifinals (May 2)
M1	Life	43
M3	Lindenwood	14
M2	Davenport	32
C1	St. Mary's	48

Final (May 9)
M1	Life	24
C1	St. Mary's	30

2016

Quarterfinals
1	St. Mary's (Calif.)	77
Air Force	17
4	Utah	36
Arizona	14
2	Life Univ	44
Davenport	0
3	Lindenwood	36
Indiana	28

Semifinals
St. Mary's (Calif.)	81
Utah	32
Life Univ.	41
Lindenwood	7

Final
St. Mary's (Calif.)	20
Life Univ	24

2017

Quarterfinals; April 22
1	St. Mary's (Calif.)	72
9	San Diego State	5
14	Arizona	48
16	Baylor	5
Lindenwood	20
2	Life Univ.	37
3	BYU	44
7	Indiana	17

Semifinals; April 29
1	St. Mary's (Calif.)	43
14	Arizona	7
2	Life Univ.	36
3	BYU	26

Final; May 6
1	St. Mary's (Calif.)	30
2	Life Univ	24

2018

Sweet 16 (April 14)
1	Saint Mary's	58
16	Cal Poly	22
8	Texas A&M	12
9	Lindenwood	83
6	Indiana	0
11	Navy	47
3	California	85
14	Grand Canyon	14
2	Life	87
15	Central Washington	7
7	Colorado State	15
10	Army	52
5	Penn State	51
12	Arizona	34
4	BYU	34
13	Arkansas State	23

Elite Eight (April 21)
1	Saint Mary's	22
9	Lindenwood	43
11	Navy	27
3	California	33
2	Life	44
10	Army	10
5	Penn State	48
4	BYU	46

Final Four (April 28)
9	Lindenwood	22
3	California	43
2	Life	69
5	Penn State	14

National Championship Game (May 5)
3	California	5
2	Life	60

2019

Sweet 16 (April 13)	Elite Eight (April 20)
1	California	141
8	UC Davis	3
1	California	61
4	Arizona	16
4	Arizona	28
5	Central Washington	19
WEST
3	BYU	50
6	UCLA	12
3	BYU	12
2	Saint Mary's	71
2	Saint Mary's	74
7	Grand Canyon	12
1	Life	34
8	Penn State	3
1	Life	40
5	Navy	25
4	Oklahoma	0
5	Navy	71
EAST
3	Wisconsin	0
6	Lindenwood	97
6	Lindenwood	22
7	Arkansas State	18
2	Army	24
7	Arkansas State	31

Final Four (April 27)
1	California	28
2	Saint Mary's	24
1	Life	27
6	Lindenwood	19

National Championship Game (May 4)
1	California	26
1	Life	29

=== 2020s ===
2022

Round 1 (April 9)
4	Central Washington	62
5	Cal Poly	17
3	BYU	59
6	Arizona	13
4	Life	26
5	Navy	13
3	Texas A&M	w/o
6	Arkansas State	w/o

Elite Eight (April 16)
1	California	43
4	Central Washington	26
2	Saint Mary's	24
3	BYU	22
1	Army	39
4	Life	18
2	Lindenwood	41
6	Arkansas State	10

Final Four (April 23)
1	California	26
2	Saint Mary's	35
1	Army	19
2	Lindenwood	14

National Championship Game (April 30)
2	Saint Mary's	8
1	Army	20

2023

Round 1 (April 8)
4	BYU	71
5	Arizona	33
3	California	82
6	Cal Poly	15
4	Army	36
5	Davenport	34
3	Life	82
6	Texas A&M	0

Elite Eight (April 15)
1	Central Washington	31
4	BYU	62
2	Saint Mary's	28
3	California	29
1	Navy	30
4	Army	6
2	Lindenwood	29
3	Life	8

Final Four (April 22)
4	BYU	31
3	California	55
1	Navy	12
2	Lindenwood	10

National Championship Game (May 6)
3	California	22
1	Navy	28

2024

Sweet 16 (April 6)	Elite Eight (April 13)
1	Saint Mary's	78
8	Grand Canyon	7
1	Saint Mary's	34
4	California	16
4	California	70
5	Cal Poly	13
WEST
3	BYU	48
6	UCLA	15
3	BYU	40
2	Central Washington	26
2	Central Washington	23
7	Arizona	17
1	Navy	41
8	University of Mary Washington	7
1	Navy	57
4	Arkansas State	5
4	Arkansas State	23
5	Davenport	17
EAST
3	Lindenwood	26
6	Mount St. Mary's	0
3	Lindenwood	10
2	Life	25
2	Life	24
7	Army	17

Final Four (April 20)
1	Saint Mary's	46
3	BYU	31
1	Navy	27
2	Life	17

National Championship Game (May 4)
1	Saint Mary's	26
1	Navy	22

2025

Sweet 16 (April 5)	Elite Eight (April 12)
1	California	76
8	Colorado State	7
1	California	74
5	Arizona	45
4	Cal Poly	19
5	Arizona	47
WEST
3	Central Washington	53
6	BYU	26
3	Central Washington	48
2	Saint Mary's	53
2	Saint Mary's	24
7	UCLA	17
1	Life	92
8	Davenport	7
1	Life	18
4	Army	17
4	Army	25
5	Mount St. Mary's	15
EAST
3	Lindenwood	24
6	Arkansas State	7
3	Lindenwood	10
2	Navy	3
2	Navy	45
7	Penn State	7

Final Four (April 19)
1	California	38
2	Saint Mary's	27
1	Life	31
3	Lindenwood	7

National Championship Game (May 3)
1	California	55
1	Life	38

2026

Sweet 16 (April 11)	Elite Eight (April 18)
1	California	83
8	San Diego	5
1	California	96
4	BYU	12
4	BYU	33
5	Cal Poly	19
WEST
3	Arizona	41
6	Grand Canyon	35
3	Arizona	19
2	Saint Mary's	48
2	Saint Mary's	69
7	Colorado State	10
1	Navy	40
8	Mary Washington	11
1	Navy	38
4	Army	10
4	Army	42
5	Arkansas State	17
EAST
3	Life	61
6	Mount St. Mary's	5
3	Life	31
2	Lindenwood	24
2	Lindenwood	31
7	Penn State	10

Final Four (April 25)
1	California	59
2	Saint Mary's	19
1	Navy	35
3	Life	21

National Championship Game (May 2)
1	California	36
1	Navy	22

== See also ==
- Collegiate Rugby Championship
- College rugby
- Division 1-A Rugby
- Intercollegiate sports team champions
- USA Rugby Sevens Collegiate National Championships
- Varsity Cup Championship
