= 1986 National Collegiate Rugby Championship =

Tournament details
- Tournament format(s): Knockout
- Date: May 3 – 4, 1986

Tournament statistics
- Teams: 4
- Matches played: 4

Final
- Venue: Pebble Beach, CA
- Champions: California (6th title)
- Runners-up: Dartmouth

The 1986 National Collegiate Rugby Championship was the seventh edition of the official national championship for intercollegiate rugby. The tournament took place concurrently with the 28th Pebble Beach Rugby Classic on Collins Polo Field at Pebble Beach, California. The Cal Bears won their sixth title with a victory over Dartmouth. Kevin Lake of California was the MVP forward with Juta Vanda of Dartmouth MVP back. Air Force took second in the Lookin' Good Award.

== Venue ==
California
Collins Polo Field	1986 National Collegiate Rugby Championship is located in California
Pebble Beach, California	1986 National Collegiate Rugby Championship is located in California
Capacity:	1986 National Collegiate Rugby Championship is located in California

== Participants ==
Dartmouth (Hanover, NH)
Qualified for the National Championship by advancing from the Eastern College Championship in Marietta, GA on April 19–20.

- Dartmouth 4-0 Navy
- Dartmouth 11-6 Virginia Tech

Colors– Dark Green
Record- 19-0
President- Ted Conway
Coach- Guy Smith
Captain- Rich Levitan, Raoul Socher
Roster:
Jon Bigelow (Flyhalf), Tim Casey (Center), Teddy Conway (Center), Clay Corbus (Flanker), Peter Gibson (Wing), Jay Henry (Wing), Rob Hunger (Lock), John Jakiemic (Prop), Chris Keating (Hooker), Ken Klemm (Prop), Rich Levitan (Prop/Hooker), Phil McCune (Lock), Jason McGinnis (Wing), Lewis Owens (Wing Forward), Geoff Parker (Fullback), Raoul Socher (Center), Cristian Tahta (Prop), Rob Thomson (Lock), Vic Trautwein (Wing Forward), Don Valentine (#8), Juta Vanda (Scrumhalf).

Bowling Green (Bowling Green, OH)
Qualified for the National Championship by winning the Midwest Universities Cup on April 19–20 in Champaigne, IL.

- Bowling Green 17-0 Tennessee
- Bowling Green 26-9 Illinois State
- Bowling Green 26-0 Wisconsin-Platville
- Bowling Green 7-6 University of Wisconsin

Colors– Brown/Orange/Black
Record- 29-5-1(13-0)
Coach- Roger Mazzerella
Captains- Dave Meyer, Mark Laimbeer
Roster:
Scott Ault (Center), Jerry Busch (Fullback), Kevin Beecher (Scrumhalf), Steve Carter (Center), Dave Cramer (Prop), Rob Clark (Wing), Ed Cvelbar (Prop), Steuart Fish (Lock), Jeff Guy (Flyhalf), Scott Huff (Flyhalf), Kevin Koch (Flanker), Tony Konczak (Center), Mark Laimbeer (Scrumhalf), John Lonsert (Wing), Bob Laird (Lock), Dan Martello (Prop), Dave Meyer (Hooker), Mark Manning (Lock), Fred Parshall (Fullback), John Pugh (Hooker), Tom Schloemer (Flanker), Gus Saponari (Wing), Jon Sweede (Flanker), Trent Tate (Lock), Chuck Tunnacliffe (Lock), Carl Vella (Flanker), Pat Wood (#8), Jeff Weemhoff (Center).

Air Force (Colorado Springs, CO)
Qualified for the National Championship by winning the Western Collegiate Championship on April 19–20 in Las Cruces, NM.

- Air Force 45-0 South Dakota (Quarterfinal)
- Air Force 10-6 Oklahoma (Semifinal)
- Air Force 24-9 Kansas State (Final)

Colors– Royal blue/White
Record- 20-4
Coach- Vern Francis, Barney Ballinger, Waldo
Captains- Keith McCoy, Bruce Ellis
Roster:
Matt Beals (Center), Igor Beaufils (Wing), Paul Bianchi (Lock), Mark Bissell (Fullback), Steve Clapp (#8), Rick Coveno (Hooker), Bruce Ellis (Center), Roger Forsythe (Lock), Steve Hajosy (Flyhalf), Jim Herron (Prop), Bill Leake (Prop), Larry Littrell (Scrumhalf), Dennis Malfer (Flyhalf), Keith McCoy (Prop), Denny McDevitt (Flanker), Rick Metzger (Lock), Dan Miller (#8), Ken Norris (Fullback), Scott Savoie (Wing), Mark Schieve (Lock), Tom Sharpy (Flanker), Scott Stark (Wing), Ivan Thompson (Flanker).

California (Berkeley, CA)
Qualified from Pacific Coast College Championships on April 25–27 in Tucson, AZ.

- California 17-0 Washington State (Quarterfinal)
- California 22-3 Arizona (Semifinal)
- California 34-9 UC Santa Barbara (Final)

Colors– Blue/Gold
Record 11-5(6-0)
Coach- Jack Clark, Ned Anderson, Tim O'Brien, Jerry Figone, Noel Bowden
Captain- Kevin Lake, John Riddering
Roster:
Pete Burschinger (Prop), Pat Doyle (Hooker), Mike Dumke (Prop), Ben Garrett (Scrumhalf), Marc Geredes (Hooker), Gary Hein (Wing), Kevin Hillesland (Flanker), David Jones (Flanker/#8), Kevin Lake (Flanker), John Lukrich (Prop), John McNamara (Lock/#8), Andrew Marich (Center), Robert Mascheroni (Fullback), Mike Metoyer (Wing), John Morken (Flyhalf), Rich Pearson (Center), John Riddering (Lock), Matt Rubenstein (Fullback), Rob Salaber (Center), Ramon Samaniego (Scrumhalf), David Simonsen (Lock), Ryan Stearns (Flyhalf), Greg Stoehr (Flanker), Brian Walgenbach (Prop), Ivan Weissman (Lock).

== Bracket ==
Regional Semifinal
April 19 - Las Cruces, NM
Air Force	10
Oklahoma	6
April 19 - Las Cruces, NM
Kansas State	15
Colorado University	6
April 19 - Marietta, GA
Dartmouth	4
Navy	0
April 19 - Marietta, GA
Virginia Tech	9
Georgia Tech	3
April 20 - Champaigne, IL
Bowling Green	26
Wisconsin–Platteville	0
April 20 - Champaigne, IL
Wisconsin	17
Kent State	3
April 26 - Tucson, AZ
California	22
Arizona	3
April 26 - Tucson, AZ
Santa Barbara	13
San Diego State	6

Regional Final
April 20 - Las Cruces, NM
Air Force	24
Kansas State	9
April 20 - Marietta, GA
Dartmouth	11
Virginia Tech	6
April 20 - Champaigne, IL
Bowling Green	7
Wisconsin	6
April 27 - Tucson, AZ
California	34
UCSB	9

National Semifinal
May 3 – Pebble Beach, CA
Air Force (West)	4
Dartmouth (East)	18
May 3 – Pebble Beach, CA
Bowling Green (Midwest)	14
California (Pacific)	31

National Final
May 4 – Pebble Beach, CA
Dartmouth	4
California	6
Third place
May 4 – Pebble Beach, CA
Air Force	13
Bowling Green	9

== Semifinals ==
3 May 1986
12:10 PM

Air Force	4–18	Dartmouth
Try: Larry Littrell 52'		Try: Peter Gibson 10'; Jason McGinnis 19'; Jason McGinnis 69'; Pen: Geoff Parker 55', 74'

Collins Field, Pebble Beach, CA
Referee: Don Reordan

3 May 1986
1:45 PM

Bowling Green	14–31	California
Try: Gus Saponari 40+'; Scott Huff; Pen: Mark Laimbeer 14', 22'		Try: Kevin Lake 55'; Greg Stoeher 58' c Gary Hein 70' c Con: Rob Mascheroni (2/3); Pen: Rob Mascheroni 24', 34', 41', 52', 76'

Collins Field, Pebble Beach, CA
Referee: Don Morrison

== Third place ==
4 May 1986
9:40 AM

Air Force	13–9	Bowling Green
Try: Bruce Ellis 20'; Scott Stark 76' c Con: Ken Norris; Pen: Ken Norris 30'		Try: 78' c Con: Mark Laimbeer; Pen: Mark Laimbeer 43',

Collins Field, Pebble Beach, CA
Referee: Don Morrison

== Final ==
4 May 1986
12:30 PM

Dartmouth	4–6	California
Try: Jason McGinnis 62'		Pen: Rob Mascheroni 22', 38'

Collins Field, Pebble Beach, CA
Attendance: 3000
Referee: Don Reordan

== See also ==
1986 National Rugby Championships
