= Zoomie Rugby Football Club =

The Zoomie Rugby Football Club (ZRFC) is an unofficial title used by both the men's and women's rugby union teams at the United States Air Force Academy. Zoomie is slang for a cadet or graduate of the United States Air Force Academy.

== History ==
The U.S. Air Force Academy men's rugby team began in 1968. In 1980, the Air Force began competing in collegiate rugby under USA rugby. Fit and fast described play in those early years, prompting the Eastern Rockies Rugby Union President, Terry Fleener, to coin the nickname "Zoomies"... which stuck and continues on to this day. Since that time, the Air Force men's rugby team has made 13 appearances in the national tournament, earning three national championships—in 1989, 1990 and 2003. Several players have gone on to represent the USA on the US men's national team, including Ben Trautwein, Matt Schmitz, Josh Dean, Mike Hobson, Brian Lemay, and Eric Duechle.

The U.S. Air Force Academy women's team was founded in 1977, shortly after the first admission of women to the academy. The women's team competed within Colorado for several years, but moved to national competition when the women's national championship competition was organized in 1991. The women's team won the first national championship that same year, and have gone on to win three more, in 1994, 2002 and 2003. Two of the Air Force women's players, Shalanda Baker and Laura McDonald, have gone on to play for the US women's national team.

== Results ==
=== Men ===
Air Force Rugby Postseason History
Year	Tournament	Finish	Result
1980	National Collegiate Rugby Championship	Finalist	Quarterfinal: W, 22-9 vs. Colorado Semi Final: W, 17-16 vs. Army Final: L, 15-9 vs. California
1983	National Collegiate Rugby Championship	Finalist	Quarterfinal: W, 13-9 vs. Oklahoma Semi Final: W, 6-3 vs Navy Final: L, 13-3 vs. California
1986	National Collegiate Rugby Championship	Third Place	Quarterfinal: W, 24-9 vs. Kansas State Semi Final: L, 18-4 vs. Dartmouth 3rd Place: W, 13-9 vs. Bowling Green
1987	National Collegiate Rugby Championship	Finalist	Quarterfinal: W, 19-10 vs. Colorado Semi Final: W, 15-8 vs. Bowling Green Final: L, 10-9 vs. San Diego State
1988	National Collegiate Rugby Championship	Third Place	Quarterfinal: W, 22-13 vs. Colorado Semi Final: L, 19-10 vs. California 3rd Place: W, 32-0 vs. Bowling Green
1989	National Collegiate Rugby Championship	Champions	Quarterfinal: W, 22-9 vs. Colorado Semi Final: W, 17-16 vs. Army Final: W, 25-7 vs. Long Beach
1990	National Collegiate Rugby Championship	Champions	Quarterfinal: W, 47-10 vs. Kansas Semi Final: W, 37-32 vs. Ohio State Final: W, 18-12 vs. Army
1992	National Collegiate Rugby Championship	Third Place	Quarterfinal: W, 24-0 vs. Colorado Semi Final: L, 30-15 vs. Army 3rd Place: W, 20-13 vs Penn State
1993	National Collegiate Rugby Championship	Finalist	L, 36-6 vs. California
1994	National Collegiate Rugby Championship	Third Place	3rd Place: W, vs. Penn State
1995	National Collegiate Rugby Championship	Finalist	Semi Final: W, vs. Army NCG: L, 48-16 vs. California
2003	National Collegiate Rugby Championship	Champions	Final Four: W, 46-28 vs. California NCG: W, 45-37 vs. Harvard
2004	National Collegiate Rugby Championship	Semi Finalist	Sweet 16: W, 71-10 vs. Tennessee Elite 8: W, 16-13 vs. Ohio State Final Four: L, 36-32 vs. Cal Poly-SLO

=== Women ===
- 1991 National Champions
- 1992 National 3rd place
- 1993 National runners up
- 1994 National Champions
- 1995 National 3rd place
- 1996 National 3rd place
- 1997 National 3rd place
- 1998 National 4th place
- 2002 National Champions
- 2003 National Champions
