= 1985 National Collegiate Rugby Championship =

Tournament details
- Tournament format(s): Knockout
- Date: May 4 – 5, 1985

Tournament statistics
- Teams: 4
- Matches played: 4

Final
- Venue: Pebble Beach, CA
- Champions: California (5th title)
- Runners-up: Maryland

The 1985 National Collegiate Rugby Championship was the sixth edition of the official national championship for intercollegiate rugby. The tournament took place concurrently with the 27th Pebble Beach Rugby Classic on the Polo Fields at Pebble Beach, California. California won their fifth title with a victory over Maryland. Gary Hein of Cal was MVP.

== Venue ==
California
Collins Polo Field	1985 National Collegiate Rugby Championship is located in California
Pebble Beach, California	1985 National Collegiate Rugby Championship is located in California
Capacity:	1985 National Collegiate Rugby Championship is located in California

== Participants ==
Illinois (Champaign–Urbana, IL)
Qualified for the National Championship by advancing from the Midwest College Championship at Northwestern in Evanston, IL on April 27–28.

- Illinois 21-0 Wisconsin Lacrosse
- Illinois 20-0 Ohio State
- Illinois 15-6 Miami Ohio
- Illinois 25-12 Wisconsin

Colors– Orange/Blue
Record– 20–8 (7-1)
President- Rick Mihevc
Coach- Hamish Fraser, Frank Hoffman, Augustine
Roster:
Phil Alderks (Flanker), Mark Augostyn (Center), John Benson (Center), Mike Bersani (Prop), Anthony Byrne (Fullback), Mike Carmody (Wing), Jim Chrystal (Lock), Brent Doden (Center), Campbell Dorward (Flanker/Fullback), Steve Duvall (Scrumhalf), Mike Gingerich (Flanker), Howard Hall (Flyhalf), Ken Hodge (Hooker), Randy Hopkins (#8), Bob MacKean (Flanker), Rick Mihevc(Flyhalf), John North (Flanker), Jerry Plant (Wing), Tom Quinn (Lock), Steve Scheller (Wing), Bob Summers (Hooker), Doc Watson (Prop), Stephen Zidek (Wing).

Maryland (College Park, MD)
Qualified for the National Championship by winning the Eastern Collegiate Championship at LSU in Baton Rouge, LA on April 20–21.

- Maryland 13-6 Georgia Tech
- Maryland 16-15 Dartmouth

Colors– Record-7-1
President- Jim Abonyi
Coaches-John Niedemire/Kenny Beyer
Captain-
Roster:
Marc Benson (#8), Kevin Boman (Wing), Mike Brennan (Fullback), Joe Cox (Flanker), Dan Curry (Reserve), Steve Heslop (Hooker), Steve Jones (Reserve), Scott Keefer (Flanker), Kevin McHugh (Reserve), Ed Mihok (Reserve), Vance Mitzner (Flyhalf), Tony Morgan (Center), Jerry Mudd (Prop), Scott Rice (Wing), Bill Scrivener (Lock), Rob Skalka (Scrumhalf), Craig Tashjy (Lock), Steve Tore (Reserve), Andy Truesdale (Center), Jim Welsh (Reserve), Howie Wendt (Prop).

Colorado (Boulder, CO)
Qualified for the National Championship by winning the Western Regional on April 20–21 in Lawrence, KS.

- Colorado 37–7 Colorado State

Colors– Black/Gold
Record– 15–4
Coach- James Dunkley
Captains-
Roster:
Scott Berquist (Flanker), Adam Brickner (#8), Kevin Doran (Lock), David Drach (Prop), Don Edrington (Hooker), Steve Ernst (Fullback), Ken Ferguson (Flyhalf), Andy Fisher (Wing), Colin Forrest (Center), Holger Forrest (Center), Bill Fox (Prop), Phil Hicks (Wing), Lon Huntsman (Center), George Klein (Center), Jay Landi (Flanker), Mike Loundy (Hooker), Chad Lund (Flyhalf), Dean Maher (Flanker), Chris Matthews (Scrumhalf), Bob McOwen (Wing), Jack Millenbach (Lock), Ward Perrott (Wing), Brian Price (Center), Brendan Shanahan (Prop), Dan Willets (Lock), Rich Winkler (Lock).

California (Berkeley, CA)
Qualified from Pacific Coast Collegiate Regional at Corvallis, OR on April 25–27.

- California 18-14 UC Santa Barbara (Quarterfinal)
- California 17-4 Oregon (Semifinal)
- California 18-9 Long Beach (Final)

Colors– Blue/Gold
Record– 21-3-1(17-0)
Coach- Jack Clark, Ned Anderson, Tim O'Brien, Jerry Figone
Captain- Mark Lambourne
Roster:
Peter Buschiger (Prop), Mark Carlson (#8), Jim DiMatteo (Scrumhalf), Steve Ellis (Center), Marc Geredes (Hooker), Chris Hampton (Lock), Gary Hein (Wing), Rich Hextrum (Flanker), Don James (Prop), David Jones (Flanker/Prop), Kevin Lake (Flanker), Mark Lambourne (Hooker), John McNamara (Lock), Jim MacLaughlin (Center/Wing), Robert Mascheroni (Fullback), John Metheny (Flyhalf), Mike Metoyer (Wing), John Riddering (Lock), Matt Rubenstein (Fullback), Patrick Saberi (Flyhalf), Robert Salaber (Center), Ramon Samaniego (Scrumhalf), Brian Walgenbach (Prop), Edward Walsh (Flanker/Prop), Ivan Weissman (Lock), Ronald Tanker (Lock).

== Bracket ==
Regional Semifinal
April 26 - Corvallis, OR
California	17
Oregon State	4
April 26 - Corvallis, OR
Long Beach	9
Chico State	6
April 20 – Lawrence, KS
Colorado	25
Missouri–Rolla	6
April 20 – Lawrence, KS
Colorado State	28
Oklahoma	13
April 20 - Baton Rouge, LA
Maryland	13
Georgia Tech	6
April 20 - Baton Rouge, LA
Dartmouth	15
Virginia Tech	4
April 28 - Evanston, IL
Illinois	15
Miami (OH)	6
April 28 - Evanston, IL
Wisconsin	8
Bowling Green	4

Regional Final
April 27 - Corvallis, OR
California	18
Long Beach	9
April 21 – Lawrence, KS
Colorado	37
Colorado State	7
April 21 - Baton Rouge, LA
Maryland	16
Dartmouth	15
April 28 - Evanston, IL
Illinois	25
Wisconsin	12

National Semifinal
May 4 – Pebble Beach, CA
California (Pacific)	39
Colorado (West)	21
May 4 – Pebble Beach, CA
Maryland (East)	19
Illinois (Midwest)	14

National Final
May 5 – Pebble Beach, CA
California	31
Maryland	6
Third place
May 5 – Pebble Beach, CA
Colorado	26
Illinois	8

== Semifinals ==
4 May 1985
12:10 PM

California	39–21	Colorado
Try: Don James 4' c Mike Metoyer 17'; John Metheny 20' c Gary Hein 30'; Don James c Ramon Samanniego 57' c Rich Hextrum 62' c Con: Lambourne (4/7); Pen: Lambourne 55'		Try: Phil Hicks c Bob McOwen 47' c Phil Hicks 77' c Con: Colin Forrest (2/3); Drop: Ken Ferguson 25'

Polo Fields, Pebble Beach, CA
Referee: Morrison (USARFU)

4 May 1985
1:45 PM

Maryland	19–14	Illinois
Try: Kevin Bowman 35'; Vance Mitzner 40+2' c Rob Skalka 73' c Con: Tony Morgan (2/3); Pen: Tony Morgan 18'		Try: Campbell Dorward 76'; John Benson 80+'; Pen: Howard Hall 40+'; Howard Hall 46'

Polo Fields, Pebble Beach, CA
Referee: Jim Russell (USARFU)

== Third place ==
5 May 1985
9:40 AM

Colorado	26–8	Illinois
Try: Ken Ferguson 25'; Steve Ernst 39' c Jay Landt 50'; Colin Forrest; Chris Matthews 69'; Bob McOwen; Con: Colin Forrest (1/6)		Try: Brent Doden; Mike Carmody 77'

Polo Fields, Pebble Beach, CA
Referee: Jim Russell (USARFU)

== Final ==
5 May 1985
12:30 PM

California	31–6	Maryland
Try: Gary Hein 8'; Robert Mascheroni 50' c Mike Metoyer 60'; Gary Hein; Gary Hein 78'; Rob Salaber 81' c Con: Robert Mascheroni (2/6); Pen: Robert Mascheroni 33'		Try: Robert Skalka 15' c Con: Tony Morgan (1/1)

Polo Fields, Pebble Beach, CA
Referee: Nixon (USARFU)

== See also ==
1985 National Rugby Championships
