= 1988 National Collegiate Rugby Championship =

Tournament details
- Tournament format(s): Knockout
- Date: April 30 – May 1, 1988

Tournament statistics
- Teams: 4
- Matches played: 4

Final
- Venue: Pebble Beach, CA
- Champions: California (7th title)
- Runners-up: Dartmouth

The 1988 National Collegiate Rugby Championship was the ninth edition of the official national championship for intercollegiate rugby. The tournament took place concurrently with the 30th Pebble Beach Rugby Classic on Collins Polo Field at Pebble Beach, California. The Cal Bears won their seventh title with a victory over Dartmouth. Chris Tahta of Dartmouth was named best forward while Chris Williams of Cal was best back.

== Venue ==
California
Collins Polo Field	1988 National Collegiate Rugby Championship is located in California
Pebble Beach, California	1988 National Collegiate Rugby Championship is located in California
Capacity:	1988 National Collegiate Rugby Championship is located in California

== Participants ==
Dartmouth
Qualified for the National Championship by advancing from the Eastern College Championship on April 16–17 at Rexford, NY.

- Dartmouth W-L Old Dominion
- Dartmouth 19-0 Loyola Baltimore

Roster:
Coach- Phil Hansell, Jim Calmus
Captain- Corbus
Record-
Andy Axel (Center), Pat Brophy (Fullback), Eric Butz (Flanker), Clay Corbus (Flanker), Bob Fitzgerald (Lock), John Harris (Prop), Greg Hawes (Flanker), Jay Henry (Flyhalf), Jim Hughes (Center), Dave Jaskwich (Lock), Chris Lena (#8), Brian Loftus (Wing), Dave McConnell (Lock), Brett McDonald (Wing), Jason McGinness (Center), Toby O'Conner (Lock), Reid Parker (Wing), Jake Reynolds (Scrumhalf), Rich Schneider (Lock), John Scott (#8), Mike Silberling (Wing), Larry Socher (Hooker), Bob Sproull (Scrumhalf), Chris Tahta (Prop), Bill Washington (Prop).

Bowling Green
Qualified for the National Championship by winning the Midwest Universities Cup on April 16–17 in Bowling Green, OH.

- Bowling Green 14-3 Ohio State

Roster:
Coach- Roger Mazzerella, Tony Mazzarella
Captain- Gus Saponari
Record- 29–5–2
Scott Ault (Fullback), Dallas Black (Flanker), Tom Brademeyer (Hooker), Al Caserta (Flanker), Kyle Fulmer (Lock), Mike Geer (Hooker), Chuck Gute (Center), Todd Haitz (#8), Brian Kane (Flyhalf), Chris Kennedy (Flanker), Tony Konczak (Center), Brett Level (Prop), Mark Manning (Lock), Steve Markert (Fullback), Dan Martello (Prop), Bob Mateljan (Wing), Brian McCue (Lock), R.T. Naples (Scrumhalf), Dave Oster (Wing), Chris Round (Scrumhalf), Gus Saponari (Center), Bob Schweizer (Wing), Mike Sylvester (Flyhalf), Mike Verdes (#8), Andy Wasiniak (Lock), Jim Williams (Scrumhalf), Tim Yokules (Prop).

Air Force
Qualified for the National Championship by winning the Western Collegiate Championship on April 16–17 in Las Cruces, NM.

- Air Force 28-3 South Dakota
- Air Force 7-6 Kansas
- Air Force 22-13 Colorado

Roster:
Coach- Vern Francis, Barney Ballinger, Walt Daniels, Coode
Captains- Alex Rosano/Steve Hajosy
Record- 15–2–1
Matt Beals (Center), Mark Bissell (Fullback), Ron Buckley (Flyhalf), John Davis (Lock), Bud Demarais (#8), Dan Drummond (Lock), John Drummond (Prop), John Finley (Scrumhalf), Dave Gaines (Lock), Steve Hajosy (Flyhalf), Larry Hantla (Fullback), Tim Jozwiak (Flanker), Mike Junk (Hooker), Jeff Martinovich (Wing), Dave Mencer (Scrumhalf), Paul Meyer (Flanker), Jay Moad (Wing), Dean Phillips (Prop), Alex Rossano (Hooker), Ted Schiller (Flanker), Dave Smith (Wing), Jim Snyder (Prop), Frank Souza (Center), Dan Stone (Center), Brent Van Der Pol (#8), Art Wunder (Flanker).

California
Qualified from Pacific Coast College Championships on April 5–10 in Santa Barbara, CA.

- California 21-0 UC Davis
- California 48-0 Washington State
- California 19-15OT San Diego State

Roster:
Coach- Jack Clark
Captain-Gary Hein
Record- 15-4(9–0)
Pat Arnold (Flanker), Chris Bachelet (Flyhalf), Scott Barbour (Flanker), Gregory Chenu (Center), Richard Donat (Lock), H.B. Drake (Flanker), Michael Dumke (Prop), Gary Ervin (#8), Ben Garrett (Scrumhalf), Joseph Grupalo (Flanker), Mark Hall (Scrumhalf), Gary Hein (Fullback), Steven Hiatt (Center), Eric Johnson (Wing), John Lukrich (Prop), Drew Marich (Center), Tom Midura (#8), Sandy Park (Flyhalf), Rich Pearson (Center), Mark Resnick (Wing), Matt Rubenstein (Wing), Rick Santos (Prop), Stuart Shiff (Flanker), David Simonsen (Lock), David Smith (Hooker), James Smith (Prop), Braden Turnbull (Lock), Jon Velie (Scrumhalf), Chris Williams (Wing).

== Bracket ==
Regional Semifinal
April 10 - Santa Barbara, CA
California	48
Washington State	0
April 10 - Santa Barbara, CA
San Diego State
April 16 - Las Cruces, NM
Air Force	7
Kansas	6
April 16 - Las Cruces, NM
Colorado	20
Oklahoma	7
April 16 - Rexford, NY
Dartmouth
Old Dominion
April 16 - Rexford, NY
Loyola Baltimore	27
Southwestern Louisiana	0
April 17- Bowling Green, OH
Bowling Green	22
Miami Ohio	3
April 17- Bowling Green, OH
Ohio State	4
Illinois State	0

Regional Final
April 10 - Santa Barbara, CA
California	19
San Diego State	15
April 17 - Las Cruces, NM
Air Force	22
Colorado	13
April 17 - Rexford, NY
Dartmouth	19
Loyola Baltimore	0
April 17- Bowling Green, OH
Bowling Green	14
Ohio State	3

National Semifinal
April 30 – Pebble Beach, CA
California (Pacific)	19
Air Force (West)	10
April 30 – Pebble Beach, CA
Dartmouth (East)	25
Bowling Green (Midwest)	13

National Final
May 1 – Pebble Beach, CA
California	9
Dartmouth	3
Third place
May 1 – Pebble Beach, CA
Air Force	32
Bowling Green	0

== Semifinals ==
30 April 1988

California	19–10	Air Force
Try: Gary Hein 39'; Pen: Scott Barbour 5', 10', 27', 30', 65'		Try: Ron Buckley c Dan Stone 51'; Con: Mark Bissell

Collins Field, Pebble Beach, CA
Referee: Don Morrison (USARFU)

30 April 1988

Dartmouth	25–13	Bowling Green
Try: Chris Tahta 20' c Mike Silberling 27'; Chris Tahta; Mike Silberling 66'; Chris Tahta 70'; Con: Jay Henry; Pen: Jay Henry		Try: Scott Ault 36' c Brian McCue 50'; Con: Tony Konczak; Pen: Tony Konczak 39'

Collins Field, Pebble Beach, CA
Referee: Ed Todd (PCRFU)

== Third place ==
1 May 1988

Air Force	32–0	Bowling Green
Try: Ron Buckley c Art Wunder; Matt Beals; Frank Souza; Mark Bissell; Dan Stone; Matt Beals c Con: Mark Bissell (2/7)

Collins Field, Pebble Beach, CA

== Final ==
1 May 1988
12:30 PM

California	9–3	Dartmouth
Pen: Scott Barbour 14', 30', 38'		Pen: Jay Henry 41'

Collins Field, Pebble Beach, CA
Attendance: 4500
Referee: Ed Todd (PCRFU)

== See also ==
1988 National Rugby Championships
