= 1985 National Rugby Championships =

US rugby union competition

Tournament details
- Tournament format(s): Various
- Date: 1985

Tournament statistics

Final

The 1985 National Rugby Championships were a series of tournaments organized to determine a national champion in several divisions for United States rugby teams. The divisions included Men's/Women's Club, college, high school, Military, Sevens, and Interterritorial.

== Men's Club ==
The 1985 National Club Rugby Championship was sponsored by Michelob and took place in Chicago, IL at Winnemac Stadium from May 11–12. The teams featured in the tournament were the champions of the four sub unions of USARFU. Milwaukee rugby club won the title for the first time.

Regional Semifinal
April 27 - Chicago, IL
Milwaukee	16
Cincinnati	7
April 27 - Chicago, IL
Scioto Valley	6
Chicago Lions	0
April 27 - Conshohocken, PA
Boston	42
Old #7	0
April 27 - Conshohocken, PA
Philadelphia Whitemarsh	24
Baton Rouge	15
April 27 - Dallas, TX
Denver Barbarians	28
Dallas RFC	4
April 27 - Dallas, TX
Oklahoma U.	16
Kansas U.	14
April 27- Tempe, AZ
Old Blues	17
Los Angeles	12
April 27- Tempe, AZ
OMBAC	10
San Jose Seahawks	4

Regional Final
April 28 - Chicago, IL
Milwaukee	19
Scioto Valley	7
April 28 - Conshohocken, PA
Boston	10
Philadelphia White Marsh	6
April 28 - Dallas, TX
Denver Barbarians	36
Oklahoma U.	18
April 28 - Tempe, AZ
Old Blues	32
OMBAC	0

National Semifinal
May 11 - Chicago, IL
Milwaukee	19
Boston	10
May 11 - Chicago, IL
Denver Barbarians	15
Old Blues	8

National Final
May 12 - Chicago, IL
Milwaukee	10
Denver Barbarians	4
Third place
May 12 - Chicago, IL
Boston	10
Old Blues	7

Semifinals

11 May 1985

Milwaukee	19–10	Boston
Try: Pete Boese; Bob Bilda 78' c Con: Bill Jhung; Pen: Bill Jhung 60', 70'; Drop: Bill Jhung		Try: Paul Male; Pen: Mario Massano 8'; Mario Marsano

Chicago, IL
Referee: Nixon (USARFU)

11 May 1985

Denver Barbarians	15–8	Old Blues
Try: Doug Straehley c Con: Ray Nelson; Pen: Ray Nelson; Ray Nelson 53'; Ray Nelson		Try: Tim Mascheroni 37'; Dave Mogni

Chicago, IL
Referee: Don Morrison (USARFU)

Third place

12 May 1985

Boston	10–7	Old Blues
Try: Mario Marsano; Pen: Mario Marsano 10', 62'		Try: Dave Bateman 28'; Pen: Gary Townsend

Chicago, IL
Referee: Don Morrison

=== Final ===
12 May 1985

Milwaukee	10–4	Denver Barbarians
Try: Pete Boese; Pen: Bill Jhung 3'; Bill Jhung		Try: Nick Sweeney 13'

Chicago, IL
Referee: Ian Nixon (USARFU)

Champions: Milwaukee RFC
President: Tim O'Keefe
Coach: Tom Beckman
Captain: Bill Lemke
Roster: Mike Bahr (Lock), Tom Beckmann (Scrumhalf), Bob Bilda (Wing Forward), Pete Boese (Wing), Phil Callen (Prop), John Dabriener (#8), Tom Foley (Flyhalf), Steve Gramling (Wing Forward), Tim Gramling (Wing), Bill Hauser (Prop), Drew Howie (Center), Bill Jhung (Flyhalf), John Koeppen (Center), Joe Landry (Fullback), Mike Landry (Center), Bill Lemke (Hooker), Ed Martin (Prop), Vince Murphy (Hooker), Bill O'Connor (Scrumhalf), Drew Palin (Wing Forward), Tom Queoff (Lock), Mark Roseky (Wing), Joseph Sauer (Lock), John Starke (Prop/Lock).

== Women's Club ==
The 1985 Women's National Rugby Championship was a tournament that took place at Golden Gate Park Polo Fields on May 25–26 in San Francisco, CA. Florida State won back to back titles and fourth overall after defeating San Diego Surfers 12–6 in the final. Minnesota took third place with a 8–0 win over Chicago. Kathy Kojm of Florida State was MVP.

Quarter-finals
May 25 - San Francisco, CA
Surfers	4
Beantown	0
May 25 - San Francisco, CA
Chicago	20
Texas A&M	0
May 25 - San Francisco, CA
Florida State	20
Belmont Shore	0
May 25 - San Francisco, CA
Minnesota	10
New Orleans	6

Semi-finals
May 25 - San Francisco, CA
Surfers	6
Chicago	4
May 25 - San Francisco, CA
Florida State	12
Minnesota	0

Final
May 26 - San Francisco, CA
Surfers	6
Florida State	12
Third place
May 26 - San Francisco, CA
Chicago	0
Minnesota	8

Consolation games:

- Beantown 26–4 Texas A&M
- Belmont Shore 36–0 New Orleans

Quarterfinals

25 May 1985

Surfers	4–0	Beantown
Try: Karen Poirier 50'

San Francisco, CA

25 May 1985

Chicago	20–0	Texas A&M

San Francisco, CA

25 May 1985

Florida State	20–0	Belmont Shore
Try: Jackie Watts (2); Bebe Alley; Kathy Kojm; Con: Bowlin (1); Kojm (1)

San Francisco, CA

25 May 1985

Minnesota	10–6	New Orleans

San Francisco, CA

Semifinals

25 May 1985

Surfers	6–4	Chicago
Pen: Chris Harjue (2)		Try: Lisa Gartner

San Francisco, CA

25 May 1985

Florida State	12–0	Minnesota
Try: Karen Morton; Schlopek; Connie Jakubcin

San Francisco, CA

Third place

26 May 1985

Chicago	0–8	Minnesota
		Try: 18'; 73'

San Francisco, CA

=== Final ===
26 May 1985

Surfers	6–12	Florida State
Pen: Chris Harjue (2)		Try: Kathy Kojm; Bebe Alley 50', 78'

San Francisco, CA
Attendance: 500
Referee: Ian Nixon

President's Select XV:
Karen Lang (Minnesota), Sheila Hill (Florida St.), Patti Purcell (Chicago), Kathy Kojm (Florida St.), Lori Reese (Minnesota), Jackie Watts (Florida St.), Lisa Patefield (Minnesota), Cathy Flores (Florida St.), Kim Colweck (Chicago), Jill Goldberg (Belmont), Candi Orsini (Florida St.), Deb Ahrens (Minnesota), Micki McVann (Beantown), Suzi Rosen Arnsdorff (Florida St.), Pat Standley (Chicago).

== College ==
The 1985 College championship was won by California. Maryland was runner-up.

== Military ==
The 1985 National Military Rugby Championship was a sixteen team tournament that took place at Fort Sill, OK from May 11–12 and was won by Fort Ord of Monterey, CA with a 22–12 win over the Medical School of Maryland.

Championship Bracket

First round
May 11 – Fort Sill, OK
Monterey	30
Wright Patterson	3
May 11 – Fort Sill, OK
Davis Monthan	19
Fort Benning	7
May 11 – Fort Sill, OK
Cherry Point	0
Fort Sill	15
May 11 – Fort Sill, OK
Fort Riley	4
Okinawa	22
May 11 – Fort Sill, OK
29 Palms	0
USUHS	18
May 11 – Fort Sill, OK
Fort Stewart	17
Parris Island	0
May 11 – Fort Sill, OK
Camp Pendleton	12
Ft. Leavenworth	6
May 11 – Fort Sill, OK
Fort Hood	16
Lackland	4

Quarterfinal
May 11 – Fort Sill, OK
Monterey	16
Davis Monthan	0
May 11 – Fort Sill, OK
Fort Sill	13
Okinawa	4
May 11 – Fort Sill, OK
USUHS	9
Fort Stewart	0
May 11 – Fort Sill, OK
Camp Pendleton	4
Fort Hood	3

Semifinal
May 12 – Fort Sill, OK
Monterey	15
Fort Sill	0
May 12 – Fort Sill, OK
USUHS	7
Camp Pendleton	0

Final
May 12 – Fort Sill, OK
Monterey	22
USUHS	12

=== Final ===
12 May 1985

Monterey	22–12	USUHS
Try: Tom Edwards 15'; John Byzewski 25' c Brian McKeon 45' c Con: John Byzewski; Rob Beck; Pen: Rob Beck 65'; Drop: Mike Mahre		Try: Shawn Murphy c Ed Lucci c Con: Jim Dahl

Ft. Sill, OK
Referee: Jim Russell

Consolation Bracket

Quarter-finals
May 11 – Fort Sill, OK
Wright Patterson	9
Fort Benning	8
May 11 – Fort Sill, OK
Cherry Point	3
Fort Riley	7
May 11 – Fort Sill, OK
29 Palms	W
Parris Island	L
May 11 – Fort Sill, OK
Ft. Leavenworth	W
Lackland	L

Semi-finals
May 12 – Fort Sill, OK
Wright Patterson	9
Fort Riley	14
May 12 – Fort Sill, OK
29 Palms	14
Ft. Leavenworth	9

Final
May 12 – Fort Sill, OK
29 Palms	20
Fort Riley	6

Open Division
May 11
Wheeler/Scott 9-3 Black Sheep
Coast Guard 34-3 Campbell/Bliss
Black Sheep 14-3 Campbell/Bliss
Coast Guard 32-0 Wheeler/Scott
May 12
Coast Guard 30-0 Black Sheep
Wheeler/Scott W-L Campbell/Bliss

The 1985 Interservice Rugby Championship was held at Fort Hood, TX from 7–8 September. The teams involved were select sides of each service branch. From these teams a selection was made to field the Combined Services Rugby team for tours.

7 September 1985

Army	13–9	Air Force
Try: Rich Feathers c 39'; Con: Rich Feathers; Pen: Rich Feathers		Pen: Bob Williamson (3)

Hood Stadium

7 September 1985

Army	19–3	Marines
Try: Sam Tonga; Pen: Rich Feathers (5)		Pen: (1)

Hood Stadium

7 September 1985

Marines	11–3	Air Force
Try: (2); Pen: (1)		Pen: (1)

Hood Stadium

Championship

8 September 1985

Army	23–7	Marines
Try: Dave Bresch c Sam Tonga c ?'; Mark Teegarden; Con: Rich Feathers; Pen: Rich Feathers		Try: (1); Pen: (1)

Hood Stadium
Referee: Ian Nixon (Texas RFU)

== Sevens ==
The 1985 National Sevens Rugby Tournament was an eight team tournament sponsored by Michelob and took place on February 17, 1985, at Robb Field in San Diego, California. The eight teams played two rounds of games and then were paired off in placement matches. The Pacific Coast A team won the final over the Eastern A team. Similar to the ITTs, the other purpose of the tournament was to select members for the U.S. Eagles Seven–a–side team.

All Star Sevens–February
First round:

- Pacific A 14–4 Midwest B
- Western A 20–10 Eastern B
- Eastern A 18–0 Pacific B
- Midwest A 16–4 Western B

Second round:

- Eastern B 20–4 Midwest B
- Pacific A 17–10 Western A
- Pacific B 16–4 Western B
- Eastern A W–L Midwest A

Seventh place

17 February 1985

Midwest B	24–0	Western B
Try: John Spencer; Kevin Moylan; Enyo Dewith; Dale Tuttle; Enyo Dewith; Con: Kevin Conroy (2/5)

San Diego, CA
Referee: Dave Head (Pacific Coast)

Fifth place

17 February 1985

Eastern B	12–0	Pacific B
Try: Pete Sweet c Jim Montaine c Con: Jim Montaine (2/2)

San Diego, CA
Referee: Fletcher (Southern California)

Third place

17 February 1985

Western A	14–10	Midwest A
Try: Jim Bartle c Dave Jenkinson; Dave Jenkinson; Con: Jim Bartle		Try: Dan Kilen; Lee St. Clair c Con: Joe Scheitlin (1/2)

San Diego, CA
Referee: Sivyer (Midwest)

=== Final ===
17 February 1985

Pacific Coast A	14–10	Eastern A
Try: Denis Shanagher; Steve Gray 80' c Pete Deddah; Con: Steve Gray		Try: Terrence Titus; Jerry Miller c Con: Ned Corcoran (1/2)

San Diego, CA
Referee: Ian Nixon (USARFU)

Champions: Pacific Coast A
Roster: Dave Bateman (Old Blues), Gary Bunce (Old Blues), Pete Deddah (OMBAC), Steve Gray (OMBAC), Willie Jefferson (Harlequins), Mike Purcell (BATS), Denis Shanagher (BATS), Blane Warhurst (Old Blues).

All Star Sevens–December
A second All Star Sevens Tournament sponsored by Michelob took place in Orlando, Florida on December 7. The format was the same as the February event. Three rounds are played with winners and losers advancing to play each other respectively in the next round with the third round determining placements. Mark Gaetjen of the Eastern A team was MVP.

First round:

- West A 14–10 Pacific B
- East A 28–10 Midwest B
- Pacific A 18–10 West B
- East B 16–6 Midwest A

Second round:

- Pacific B 18–10 Midwest B
- East A 24–4 West A
- Midwest A 14–22 West B
- Pacific A 20–14 East B

Seventh place: Midwest A 24–12 Midwest B
Fifth place: West B 18–6 Pacific B

Third place

7 December 1985

East B	18–6	West A
Try: Pete Sweet c Chris Bader c Jay Fredkin c Con: Chris Bader (3/3)		Try: Bill Baker c Con: Jim Bartle (1/1)

Orlando, FL

=== Final ===
7 December 1985

East A	21–4	Pacific A
Try: Mark Gaetjen 3' c Pete Peluso 5' c Mark Gaetjen 10' c Con: Mike Caulder (3/3); Pen: Mike Caulder		Try: Del Chipman 2'

Orlando, FL
Referee: Don Morrison

East A: Mike Caulder(c)(Life College), Mark Gaetjen (NOVA), Hoover, Gary Lambert (Life College), Dan Parris (NOVA), Pete Peluso (Bethlehem), Joe Taranto (Union County).
Pacific Coast A: Dave Bateman (Old Blues), Del Chipman (OMBAC), Pete Deddeh (OMBAC), Mike Purcell (BATS), Denis Shanagher(c)(BATS), Lin Walton(OMBAC)(subbed M. Smith), Blane Warhurst (Old Blues).

Club Sevens
At the club level the National Seven–a–side championship was played as part of the 11th Annual Michelob Continental Rugby Classic at Hi Corbett Field in Tucson, Arizona on November 2nd. There were eight teams featured which included two representatives from each of the four territorial unions. The Old Mission Beach Athletic Club defeated the Northern Virginia Duck Brothers 26–12 to win the championship. Bethlehem finished third by defeating Quad City 10–6 in OT. Lin Walton of OMBAC was MVP.

First round:

- Duck Brothers 28–0 Albuquerque
- Quad City Irish 10–6 Old Blues
- Bethlehem 20–16 Texas A&M
- OMBAC 16–12 Dayton

Second round:

- OMBAC 22–12 Bethlehem
- Duck Brothers 20–12 Quad City Irish
- Old Blues 24–0 Albuquerque
- Texas A&M 18–10 Dayton

Seventh place: Dayton 12–8 Albuquerque
Fifth place: Old Blues 13–12 Texas A&M
Third place: Bethlehem 10–6 Quad City Irish
Final

2 November 1985

OMBAC	26–12	Duck Brothers
Try: Del Chipman 1'; Lin Walton; Harold McFadyen; Lin Walton; Pete Deddah; Del Chipman c Con: Harold McFadyen		Try: Mark Gaetjen c Will Brewington c Con: Will Brewington

Tucson, AZ

Champions: Old Mission Beach Athletic Club
Roster: Del Chipman, Pete Deddah, Dave Granfors, Steve Gray, Harold McFadyen, Scott Page, Mike Saunders, Brian Vizzard, Lin Walton.

== ITT ==
The Inter Territorial Tournament involved the four regional rugby unions comprising the United States RFU: Pacific Coast RFU, Western RFU, Midwest RFU, and the Eastern Rugby Union. The region teams are formed with players selected from the sub regional rugby unions. Subsequently, the USA Eagles are selected from the four regional teams after the ITT concludes. In 1985 the tournament took place at Miller Park in Sacramento, CA from May 25–27. The Pacific Coast RFU won the Junior Tournament for players under the age of 25.

Results:

25 May 1985

Western	22–16	Midwest
Try: Ray Nelson 10'; David Jenkinson c Dave Poquette 67' c Con: Ray Nelson; Pen: Ray Nelson 2', 7'		Try: Kevin Conroy c Cecil Youngblood 74'; Cecil Youngblood 78' c Con: Bill Jhung; Roger Castino

Sacramento, CA
Referee: Don Morrison (USARFU)

25 May 1985

Pacific Coast	17–11	Eastern
Try: Denis Shanagher 47'; Blane Warhurst 70'; Pen: Todd Samet 22', 60', 68'		Try: Terrence Titus 20'; Phil Green 29'; Pen: Dave Horton 5'

Sacramento, CA
Referee: Ian Nixon (USARFU)

26 May 1985

Pacific Coast	16–8	Midwest
Try: Matt Taylor 42'; Brad Chaboya; Kevin Higgins 52'; Gary Hein 61'; Con: (0/4)		Try: Kevin Moylan; Glassmeyer

Sacramento, CA
Referee: Jim Russell (USARFU)

26 May 1985

Eastern	31–15	Western
Try: Donald Rae 38' c Bill Downing 49' c Montgomery 77' c Mac Miller 83' c Fredkin; Con: Dick Cooke (4/5); Pen: Dick Cooke 74'		Try: David Jenkinson 14' c Blakemore 60' c Con: Ray Nelson; Pen: Ray Nelson

Sacramento, CA
Referee: Reardon

27 May 1985

Eastern	28–10	Midwest
Try: Larry Menyhart 3' c Kevin Swords 24' c Larry Meyhart 31'; Donald Rae 46'; Phil Green; Con: Dave Horton (3/3); Pen: Dave Horton; Dave Horton 65'		Try: Tim Ryan 21'; Pen: Joe Scheitlin; Roger Castino 38'

Sacramento, CA
Referee: Reardon

27 May 1985

Western	4–32	Pacific Coast
Try: Dave Tresemer		Try: Gary Hein 1'; Ed Burlingham c Kevin Higgins; Ed Burlingham 35'; Gary Hein 51'; Matt Taylor; Con: Todd Samet; Pen: Todd Samet; Todd Samet 48'

Sacramento, CA
Referee: Don Morrison

Champions: Pacific Coast RFU
Coach: Bing Dawson
Roster: Rick Bailey-Prop (Old Blues), Dave Bateman-Scrumhalf (Old Blues), Ed Burlingham-Lock (Irvine Coast), Brad Chaboya-Flanker (San Jose), Mark Deaton-#8 (Old Blues), John Everett-Hooker (Old Blues), Whit Everett-Flanker (Old Blues), Gary Hein-Wing (California), Roy Helu-Center (Old Blues), Kevin Higgins-Center (Cal Poly SLO), John Jelaco-Prop (Los Angeles), Rose Malinowski-Prop (PAXOS), Pete McLaughlin-Prop (San Jose), Bo Meyersieck-Flyhalf (Old Blues), John Mikel-Scrumhalf (Los Angeles), Todd Samet-Fullback (San Francisco), Denis Shanagher-Center (BATS), Bill Shiflet-Lock (Capitols), Matt Taylor-Wing (Old Blues), Brian Vizard-#8 (OMBAC), Art Ward-Lock (Old Blues), Blane Warhurst-Flanker (Old Blues), Kent Weyand-Hooker (OMBAC), Barry Williams-Wing (Los Angeles).

Team		W	L	F	A
1	Pacific Coast Grizzlies	3	0	65	23
2	Eastern Colonials	2	1	70	42
3	Western Mustangs	1	2	41	79
4	Midwest Thunderbirds	0	3	34	66

=== Juniors ===
Semifinals

25 May 1985

Midwest	22–6	Western
Try: J.R. Hassett 55'; Henry Merrill; J.R. Hassett 74'; Rob McMillion 77'; Pen: Rick Medinis; Drop: Rick Medinis		Try: Steve LaPorta c Con: Ken Ferguson

Sacramento, CA
Referee: Reordan (USARFU)

25 May 1985

Pacific Coast	22–18	Eastern
Try: Rick Crivellone; Tony Ridnell; Mike Minafo c Peterson 82'; Tony Ridnell 96'; Con: Pat Lenihan		Try: Dan Morrison 20' c Gary Giepert c Con: Dan Morrison; Pen: Dan Morrison 53'; Drop: Dan Morrison

Sacramento, CA
Referee: Jim Russell (USARFU)

Third place

26 May 1985

West	22–15	East
Try: Colin Forrest 3' c Colin Forrest 32' c Jim Aston 50' c Con: Ken Ferguson; Pen: Ken Ferguson 40'; Drop: Ken Ferguson		Try: Gary Giepert c Gary Giepert 77' c Con: Dan Morrison; Pen: Dan Morrison 20'

Sacramento, CA

Final

26 May 1985

Pacific Coast	17–14	Midwest
Try: Bruce Miller 22'; Blesio c Rich Morgan 60'; Greg Pascale 83' c Con: Pat Lenihan; Pen: Pat Lenihan		Try: Mike Minafo; Rob Butt; Pete Boese; Con: Chris O'Brien; Pen: Rick Medinis 18', 74'

Sacramento, CA
Referee: Morrison (USARFU)

Champions: Pacific Coast RFU
Coach: Jack Clark, Tim O'Brien
Roster: Bill Bicker-Center (California), John Blackburn-Flanker (California), Steve Blesio-Wing (Western Washington), Darrell Brooks-Fullback (Stanford), Mark Carlson-Flanker (California), Rick Crivellone-Lock (Portland St.), Steve Ellis-Center (California), Steve Fentress-Prop (UC San Diego), Jeff Keuchle-Lock (Oregon), John Knudson-Center (Western Washington), Kevin Lake-Flanker (California), Pat Lenihan-Fullback (San Diego St.), Mike McClintock-Hooker (California), John Metheny-Flyhalf (California), Bruce Miller-Scrumhalf (Idaho), Mike Minafo-Wing (Pepperdine), Rich Morgan-Flyhalf (Washington), Andy Odisio-Prop (St. Mary's), Ted Oschowski-Hooker (Washington), Tim Peterson-Prop (San Francisco), John Riddering-Lock (California), Tony Ridnell-#8 (West Point), Ramon Samaniego-Scrumhalf (California), Giles Wilson-Prop (San Francisco St.).

== High School ==
1985 High School Championship Trophy

The 1985 National High School Rugby Championship took place at the Tidal Basin in Washington D.C. The #2 seed Xavier (14-1-1) squad from Manhattan won the championship by defeating Highland (10-2-2) of Utah in the final by the narrowest of margins improving upon a 13 all draw with Highland earlier in the season. Highland advanced to the final beating #1 seed Burlingame (25-3) in the semifinals. Burlingame won the third place match against Vacaville.

Quarter-finals
May 18 – Washington, D.C.
Xavier	21
Redwood	3
May 18 – Washington, D.C.
Vacaville	15
Whitemarsh	3
May 18 – Washington, D.C.
Highland	12
Fairfax	6
May 18 – Washington, D.C.
Burlingame	8
Langley	4

Semi-finals
May 18 – Washington, D.C.
Xavier	18
Vacaville	0
May 18 – Washington, D.C.
Highland	16
Burlingame	6

Final
May 18 – Washington, D.C.
Xavier	7
Highland	6
Third place
May 18 – Washington, D.C.
Vacaville	7
Burlingame	32

=== Final ===
18 May 1985
6:00PM

Xavier	7–6	Highland
Try: Mike Grassi; Pen: Mike Tolkin 76'		Pen: Mike Pembroke (2)

Washington, D.C.

Champions: Xavier High School RFC
Coach: Nigel Milton
Roster: Sal Augeri (Scrumhalf), Kevin Best (#8), Peter Blessinger (Flanker), Paul Burke (Scrumhalf), Kevin Corbett (Flanker), Jim Cuddihy (Fullback), Artie Estrella (Hooker), Brian Fee (Wing), David Gallagher (Center), Spencer Gillen (Wing), Mike Grassi (Wing), Andrew Israel (Lock), Bruce McLane (Hooker), Luis Munoz (Prop), Vincent O'Grady (Flanker), David Peppis (Prop), Ronnie Rojas (Flanker), Peter Seccia (Center), Joe Sweeney (Lock), Mike Tolkin (Flyhalf), Tim Walsh (Center).
