= 1989 National Collegiate Rugby Championship =

Tournament details
- Tournament format(s): Knockout
- Date: May 6 – 7, 1989

Tournament statistics
- Teams: 4
- Matches played: 4

Final
- Venue: Colorado Springs, CO
- Champions: Air Force (1st title)
- Runners-up: Long Beach

The 1989 National Collegiate Rugby Championship was the tenth edition of the official national championship for intercollegiate rugby. The tournament, sponsored by Steinlager, took place May 6-7 at the Air Force Academy soccer fields in Colorado Springs, CO. The Air Force Zoomies won their first title with a victory over the Long Beach 49ers. John Oliver of Army was named best forward while Tim Bohman of Air Force was best back.

== Venue ==
Colorado
AF Academy	1989 National Collegiate Rugby Championship is located in Colorado
Colorado Springs, Colorado	1989 National Collegiate Rugby Championship is located in Colorado
Capacity:	1989 National Collegiate Rugby Championship is located in Colorado

== Participants ==
Army Black Nights
Qualified for the National Championship by advancing from the Eastern College Championship on April 15–16 at Annapolis, MD.

- Army 33-0 University of Buffalo
- Army 43-18 Navy

Roster:
Coach- Michael Mahan, Wallace, O'Gorman, Vaughn
Captain- John Oliver
Record-
Ron Albrecht (Prop), Dave Blain (Scrumhalf), Roscoe Blood (Prop), Brian Burlingame (Hooker), John DeBlasio (Scrumhalf), Sean DeMartino (Flanker), Kevin Dice (Flyhalf), Pete Dunn (Hooker), Kimo Gallahue (#8), Mike Halpin (Center), Mike Kilbane (Fullback), Cliff Lairson (Center), Bill Marshall (Center), Dennis McKernan (#8), Chris Morris (Flanker), Lew Nance (Center), John Oliver (Flanker), Lincoln Oro (Wing), Steven Phillips (Lock), Spence Robinson (Lock), Jim Saccone (Flyhalf), Rick Shipe (Fullback), Scott Sutherland (Prop), Vincent Torza (Center), John Wilson (Wing).

Penn State Nittany Lions
Qualified for the National Championship by winning the Midwest Universities Cup on April 22–23 in Madison, WI.

- Penn State 18-0 Michigan State
- Penn State 3-0 Bowling Green
- Penn State 13-12 Wisconsin

Roster:
Coach- Bruce Hale, Sanvido, Smith, Cranston, Bennese, Grigor, Ryland
Captain- Stephen Rae
Record-
Peter Anthan (Lock), Kevin Barry (Lock), Rich Cassidy (Fullback), Erick Chizmar (Center), Scott Davis (Wing), Greg Driscoll (Wing), Brian Ewing (Scrumhalf), James Gilhool (Lock), Howard Goldfine (Hooker), Antony Hardon (Lock), Brent Hutchings (Center), Stephen Hynes (Center), Peter Karmilowicz (Wing), Daniel Kelly (Flanker), George Nace (Hooker), Matthew Norton (Center), Lance Polcyn (Prop), Stephen Rae (Scrumhalf), Vincent Rocco (#8), Peter Skeels (Prop), Ian Wallace (Flyhalf), John Walton (Flanker), Jay Wieder (#8), Darren Woolf (Prop), John Zajac (Flanker).

Air Force Zoomies
Qualified for the National Championship by winning the Western Collegiate Championship on April 15–16 in Lawrence, KS.

- Air Force 19-0 Rice
- Air Force 16-3 Kansas
- Air Force 22-9 Colorado

Roster:
Coach- Vern Francis, Walt Daniels, Pat Gerdemann, Dave Easler, Jim Jasina
Captains- Brent VanderPol/Jon Finley
Record-
Harry Blue (Prop), Tim Bohman (Center), Ronald Buckley (Flyhalf), Dan Drummond (Lock), Eric Fester (Wing), Jonathan Finley (Scrumhalf), Jeffrey Hill (#8), William Jacobus (Wing), Timothy Jozwiak (Flanker), Michael Junk (Hooker), Eric Kelm (Hooker), Travis Klopfenstein (Flyhalf), Jon Krause (Lock), David Mets (Fullback), Douglas Nikolai (Center), Kevin Oleen (Prop), James Owen (Lock), Bradley Rogers (Fullback), Glenn Rogers Jr. (Wing), Ted Schiller (Scrumhalf), James Snyder (Prop), Mark Thomas (Scrumhalf), Brent VanderPol (#8), Don Wood (Center), Arthur Wunder (Flanker).

Long Beach 49ers
Qualified from Pacific Coast College Championships on April 7–9 in Tucson, AZ.

- Long Beach 28-7 Washington
- Long Beach 12-0 Cal Poly SLO
- Long Beach 18-10 California

Roster:
Coach- Dr. Dale Toohey, Kaplan, Stackhouse, Anderson, Morgan
Captain-Brett Bowden
Record-
Steve Agor (Wing), Timothy Aitken (Flyhalf), Brett Bowden (Flyhalf), Jim Brown (Wing), Gabriel Cobos Jr. (Fullback), Jerry Fanning (Hooker), Jimmy Guadagno (Scrumhalf), Dario Guerra (Prop), Ray Harper (#8), Mark Kitchen (Center), Andrew Klinkenberg (Lock), Charlie McKerras (Lock), Steve Meert (Scrumhalf), Derrick Munck (#8), Andrew Nicholls (Lock), Jack Purdy (Prop), Kevin Robinson (Center), Eric Skaar (Flanker), Chris Stratton (Wing), Dean Toohey (Flanker), Jon Westerman (Hooker).

== Bracket ==
Regional Semifinal
April 15 - Lawrence, KS
Air Force	16
Kansas	3
April 15 - Lawrence, KS
Colorado	32
Oklahoma	3
April 15 - Annapolis, MD
Army	35
Buffalo	0
April 15 - Annapolis, MD
Navy	34
Georgia Tech	7
April 8 - Tucson, AZ
Long Beach	12
Cal Poly SLO	0
April 8 - Tucson, AZ
California	15
Chico State	6
April 22 - Madison, WI
Penn State	3
Bowling Green	0
April 22 - Madison, WI
Wisconsin	12
Miami Ohio	0

Regional Final
April 16 - Lawrence, KS
Air Force	22
Colorado	9
April 16 - Annapolis, MD
Army	43
Navy	18
April 9 - Tucson, AZ
Long Beach	18
California	10
April 23 - Madison, WI
Penn State	13
Wisconsin	12

National Semifinal
May 6 – Colorado Springs, CO
Air Force (West)	17
Army (East)	16
May 6 – Colorado Springs, CO
Long Beach (Pacific)	18
Penn State (Midwest)	9

National Final
May 7 – Colorado Springs, CO
Air Force	25
Long Beach	7
Third place
May 7 – Colorado Springs, CO
Army	38
Penn State	10

== Semifinals ==
6 May 1989
1:00PM

Long Beach	18–9	Penn State
Try: Jerry Fanning 9'c Con: Brett Bowden; Pen: Brett Bowden (3); Drop: Brett Bowden		Pen: Erick Chizmar 15'; Drop: Ian Wallace 60'; Ian Wallace 65'

Colorado Springs, CO
Referee: Don Morrison (New England RFU)

6 May 1989
3:00PM

Air Force	17–16	Army
Try: Tim Bohman 25'; Tim Bohman 60' c Brent VanderPol 80'; Con: Skip Rodgers 1/2; Pen: Skip Rogers 40'		Try: Lincoln Oro 10'; Lincoln Oro c Con: Dave Blain 1/2; Pen: Dave Blain 50'; Dave Blain 68'

Colorado Springs, CO
Attendance: 2000
Referee: Jim Russell (Eastern Rockies RFU)

== Third place ==
7 May 1989
1:00PM

Army	38–10	Penn State

Colorado Springs, CO

== Final ==
7 May 1989
3:00 PM

Air Force	25–7	Long Beach
Try: Art Wunder c Jon Finley; Ted Schiller 71' c Tim Bohman c Con: Skip Rodgers (3/4); Pen: Skip Rogers 20'		Try: Jim Brown; Pen: Brett Bowden 9'

Colorado Springs, CO
Attendance: 3000
Referee: Don Morrison (NERFU)

Champions: Air Force Academy Zoomies
Coaches: Vern Francis, Walt Daniels, Pat Gerdemann, Dave Easler, Jim Jasina.
Roster: Jim Snyder (Prop), Kevin Oleen (Prop), Harry Blue (Prop), Mike Junk (Hooker), Eric Kelm (Hooker), Dan Drummond (Lock), Jay Owen (Lock), John Krause (Lock), Tim Jozwiak (Wing Forward), Ted Schiller (Wing Forward), Art Wunder (Wing Forward), Jeff Hill (#8), Brent VanderPol (#8), Jon Finley (Scrum Half), Mark Thomas (Scrum Half), Tim Bohman (Center), Bill Jacobus (Center), Donnie Wood (Center), Eric Fester (Wing), Doug Nikolai (Wing), Skip Rodgers (Wing), Dave Mets (Full Back), Brad Rodgers (Full Back).

== College All–Stars ==
The inaugural All–Star Championship for college rugby players took place in Colorado Springs, CO from June 17–18. Similar to the Inter Territorial Tournaments for club teams the college competition is divided by geographic union and used to select the All–American team that goes on to play other junior national rugby teams. In the final the Eastern RU defeated the Western RFU 31–12. The final standings were 1st East, 2nd West, 3rd Pacific and 4th Midwest.

Semifinals:

17 June 1989

East	22–14	Midwest
Try: Chris Andres 30', 60'; Greg Hawes 42'; Dan Durenberger; Pen: Matt Miller 39', 55'		Try: Mike Vogel 10', Paul Murray 66'; Pen: Matt Pickston 12'; Drop: Ian Wallace 46'

Colorado Springs, CO
Referee: Jim Jeffers (Western RFU)

17 June 1989

West	18–16	Pacific Coast
Try: Rick Loudenburg c Bill Kirkelie c Con: Andy Seelaus; Pen: Andy Seelaus 50', 79'		Try: Chris Williams; Pen: Simon Matthews 4', 14', 19', 70'

Colorado Springs, CO
Referee: Jim Russell (USARFU)

Consolation Final:

18 June 1989

Pacific Coast	29–13	Midwest
Try: Chris Casey 1' c David Hodges 34'; Chris Williams c Greg Schubert 53' c Dean Toohey 59'; Con: Scott Mauk; Pen: Scott Mauk 20'		Try: Mike Vogel 10'; Pen: Matt Pickston 55'

Colorado Springs, CO

Final:

18 June 1989

East	31–12	West
Try: Greg Bradshaw c, 42'; Jeff Herb c, 68' c Con: Chris Liles; Pen: Chris Liles 24'; Bruce Miller; Drop: Chris Liles 39'		Try: Jay Smith c Con: Andy Seelaus; Pen: Andy Seelaus 35'; Drop: Andy Seelaus

Colorado Springs, CO
Referee: Jim Russell (USARFU)

Champions: Eastern Colonials
Coaches: Tony Reynolds, Martyn Kingston, Ken Daly (manager).
Roster: Chris Andres, Sal Augeri, Greg Bradshaw, Steve Brinson, Rich Brown, Edward Carroll, Darden Couch, Dan Durenberger, Jon Greenberg, Neil Guinan, Greg Hawes, Jeff Herb, Jim Johnson, James Keller, Chris Liles, Francis Mayer, Stu McLellan, Bruce Miller, Matt Miller, Kim Pipkin, Kareem Rifaat, Arien Sabban, Greg Schor, Bill Starkie, Greg Stiles, Mike Tolkin, Robard Williams.

All–Americans
Shields (trainer), Porter (coach), Clark (coach), Kingston (coach), Reynolds (manager), Andres, Estep, Matthews, Bohman, Miller, R. Williams, Bracken, Allen, Greenberg, McPherson, Klinkenberg, Couch, Zugovitz, Keller, McKerras, Mayer.

== See also ==
1989 National Rugby Championships
