= 1992 National Collegiate Rugby Championship =

Tournament details
- Tournament format(s): Knockout
- Date: May 2 – 3, 1992

Tournament statistics
- Teams: 4
- Matches played: 4

Final
- Venue: Colorado Springs, CO
- Champions: UC Berkeley (9th title)
- Runners-up: Army

The 1992 National Collegiate Rugby Championship was the thirteenth edition of the official national championship for intercollegiate rugby. Both the Men's and Women's tournaments took place at the Air Force Academy in Colorado Springs, CO from May 1–3. UC Berkeley won their ninth title with a victory over Army. Masanao Morimoto of Berkeley was named Most Valuable Forward while Garth Yarnall of Army was Most Valuable Back.

== Venue ==
Colorado
AF Academy	1992 National Collegiate Rugby Championship is located in Colorado
Colorado Springs, Colorado	1992 National Collegiate Rugby Championship is located in Colorado
Capacity:	1992 National Collegiate Rugby Championship is located in Colorado

== Participants ==
Army Black Nights

Qualified for the National Championship by advancing from the Eastern College Championship on December 7–8 at Highland Park in Baton Rouge, LA.

- Army 25-10 Harvard
- Army 27-8 LSU

Record- 16–4–1
Coaches- Andrew Drake, Larry McAnneny (Manager)
Captain-
Roster:
Eric Achenbach (Fullback), Bill Besterman (Prop), Jeff Chuck (Scrumhalf), Russ DeMartino (Hooker), Torrey Diciro (Center), Luke Dodds (Wing), Pat Downes (Lock), Eric Hall (Flyhalf), Michael Gray (Flanker), Eric Hall (Flyhalf), Chris Hsu (Fullback), Marshall Malinowski (#8), Mike Mazzocco (Wing), Mike McKay (Flanker), Robert Moseley (Center), John Murphy (Scrumhalf), Andy Pero (Lock), John Petrucelli (Prop), Mike Roberts (Prop), Trey Rutherford (Flanker), Sam Saine (Lock), Sean Simpson (Flyhalf), John Wallace (Wing), Aaron Wehrenberg (Prop), Garth Yarnell (Center), Peter Young (Wing).

Penn State Nittany Lions

Qualified for the National Championship by winning the Midwest Universities Cup on April 18–19 in Bowling Green, OH.

- Penn State 18–15 Cincinnati
- Penn State 15–10 Ohio State
- Penn State 30–12 Notre Dame
- Penn State 7-6 Wisconsin

Record- 10–1–1
Coaches- Bruce Hale, Dave Collins, Terry Ryland, Kevin Oyler
Captains- Peter Karmilowicz (Flyhalf), Scott Davis (Fullback)
Roster:
Alec Acosta (Wing), Chris Amoratis (Flanker), Mal Bland (Hooker), Todd Bowser (Prop), Gregory Brandwene (Lock), Thomas Buch (Flanker), Chris Cardi (#8), Shawn Crago (Flanker), Alexander DeVicaris (Prop), Daniel Fasold (Center), Tim Finnerty (Flanker), David Galante (Lock), Jay Kolb (Prop), Valdis Krumins (Wing), Jeff Lockhart (Hooker), Jeffrey Lutton (Lock), Matt Lyman (Lock), Ryan Nagle (Scrumhalf), Eric Rempe (Flyhalf), Jeff Rudy (Prop), Christopher Scala (Center), Bill Snyder (Scrumhalf), Bryan Storm (#8), Michael Underhill (Wing).

Air Force

Qualified for the National Championship by winning the Western Collegiate Championship on April 11–12 in Lawrence, KS.

- Air Force 34-12 John Brown University
- Air Force 39-0 Missouri
- Air Force 24-0 Colorado

Colors– Blue/Silver
Record- 11–0
Coach- Vern Francis, Dave Myers, Skip Shackelford, Keith Gay (Manager)
Captains- Chuck Corcoran (Scrumhalf), Scott MacKenzie (Wing)
Roster:
Dave Adams (Flanker), Matt Benivegna (Flyhalf), Eric Bulger (Flanker), Chris Caputo (Wing), David Durban (Flanker/Lock), Chris Eden (Flyhalf), Dayne Fentress (Hooker), Brian Greenroad (Prop), Casey Hackathorn (Center), Andy Hamann (Center), Mick Harper (Hooker), Robert Harris (Wing), Steven Heinlein (Lock), Timrek Heisler (Lock), Michael Marcoux (Center), Robert Meeks (#8), Thomas Nicholson (#8), Blaine Nye (Prop), Martin Payne (Flanker), Marty Reynolds (Fullback), Chu Soh (Scrumhalf), Chris Tobias (Prop), Michael Traw (Prop).

UC Berkeley

Qualified from Pacific Coast College Championships on April 11–12 in Los Angeles, CA.

- UC Berkeley 46-3 Oregon
- UC Berkeley 25-0 CSU Long Beach
- UC Berkeley 40-7 Cal Poly San Luis Obispo

Record- 24–4
Coach- Jack Clark, Dan Porter, Rick Bailey, Jerry Figone (Manager)
Captain-Greg Chenu (Center)
Roster:
Andre Bachelet (Scrumhalf), Christian Bachelet (Flyhalf), John Ball (Center), Jon Beck (Lock), Kelly Bellue (Prop), Tom Chapman (Lock), Jeff Chenu (#8), David Codevilla (Lock), Peter Codevilla (Lock), Charles Foster (Hooker), Frank Grant (Wing), Eric Harmon (Fullback), Tim Hoover (Wing), Pat Keegan (Center), Chris Kennerly (Prop), Chris King (Flanker), Chester Koh (Hooker), Ray Lehner (Prop), David Liebowitz (Prop), Rob Lumkong (#8), Joshua Martin (Flanker), Masanao Morimoto (Flanker), Scott Painter (Wing), Matt Palamountain (Wing), Doug Pearson (Flanker), Ed Schram (Center), Rob Swanbeck (Center), Ian Tong (Fullback).

== Bracket ==
Regional Semifinal
April 11 - Los Angeles, CA
UC Berkeley	25
CSU Long Beach	0
April 11 - Los Angeles, CA
Cal Poly SLO	14
Oregon State	0
April 18 - Bowling Green, OH
Penn State	30
Notre Dame	12
April 18 - Bowling Green, OH
Wisconsin	7
Bowling Green	6
December 7 - Baton Rouge, LA
Army	25
Harvard	10
December 7 - Baton Rouge, LA
LSU	13
Navy	7
April 11 - Lawrence, KS
Air Force	39
Missouri	0
April 11 - Lawrence, KS
Colorado	6
Rice	4

Regional Final
April 12 - Los Angeles, CA
UC Berkeley	40
Cal Poly SLO	7
April 19 - Bowling Green, OH
Penn State	7
Wisconsin	6
December 8 - Baton Rouge, LA
Army	27
LSU	8
April 12 - Lawrence, KS
Air Force	24
Colorado	0

National Semifinal
May 2 – Colorado Springs, CO
UC Berkeley (Pacific)	28
Penn State (Midwest)	6
May 2 – Colorado Springs, CO
Army (East)	30
Air Force (West)	15

National Final
May 3 – Colorado Springs, CO
UC Berkeley	27
Army	17
Third place
May 3 – Colorado Springs, CO
Air Force	20
Penn State	13

== Semifinals ==
2 May 1992
11:00AM

UC Berkeley	28–6	Penn State
Try: Tim Hoover 15' c Ray Lehner 51'; Ed Schram 58' c Tim Hoover 77' c Con: Andre Bachelet (1); Rob Swanbeck (2); Pen: Andre Bachelet 3', 1H'		Try: Bryan Storm 80' c Con: Scott Davis

Colorado Springs, CO
Referee: Scott Miller (Eastern Rockies)

2 May 1992
12:45PM

Army	30–15	Air Force
Try: Trey Rutherford 15'; Jeff Chuck 45'; Pete Young 59' c Marshall Malinowski 64'; Pete Young 74' c Con: Eric Hall; Pen: Eric Hall 8', 47'		Try: Chris Eden 26' c Andy Hamann 29' c Con: Chris Eden; Pen: Chris Eden 52'

Colorado Springs, CO
Referee: Dave Head (SoCal)

== Third place ==
3 May 1992
10:00 AM

Air Force	20–13	Penn State

Colorado Springs, CO
Referee: Bob Loftus (Midwest)

== Final ==
3 May 1992
2:30 PM

UC Berkeley	27–17	Army
Try: Andre Bachelet 6' c Matt Palamountain 15'; Ed Schram 28'; Con: Andre Bachelet; Pen: Andre Bachelet 24', 67'; Rob Swanbeck 71'; Christian Bachelet 75'		Try: John Petrucelli 38'; Garth Yarnall 61'; Pen: Eric Hall 46', 49', 74'

Colorado Springs, CO
Attendance: 2000
Referee: Dave Head (SoCal)

== Women's College Championship ==
The 1992 Women's Collegiate Championship took place at the Air Force Academy in Colorado Springs, CO from May 2–3. Boston College qualified by winning the East Coast Territorial championship. University of Connecticut was the runner–up at the Eastern Territorial. Boston College was the champion of this second edition. University of Connecticut flanker Kimberly Cyganik was named Most Valuable forward and Boston College fullback Rachel Jackson was Most Valuable back.

=== Semifinals ===
2 May 1992
2:30PM

Connecticut	12–8	Air Force
Try: Marilyn McReynolds 12' c, 44' c Con: Wendy Walworth (2/2)		Try: Margaret Dawson 36'; Tracy Hubbard 77'

Colorado Springs, CO
Referee: Jim Jeffers (Heart of America)

2 May 1992
4:15PM

Boston College	28–0	Colorado State
Try: Lauren Daly; Rachel Jackson; Kathy Mendes; Jacqueline Laurencelle; Charlotte Samper; Rachel Jackson; Kelly Khozozian

Colorado Springs, CO
Referee: Bill Tomb (Eastern Rockies)

=== Third place ===
3 May 1992
10:00AM

Air Force	52–0	Colorado State

Colorado Springs, CO

=== Final ===
3 May 1992
9:45AM

Boston College	12–6	Connecticut
Try: Heather Smith 43'; Julie Lane 52'; Heather Smith 73'		Try: Leslie Body 77' c Con: Wendy Walworth

Colorado Springs, CO
Referee: Scott Miller (Eastern Rockies)

Lineups:
UConn– Walworth, Richards, Enrique, Wolff, Dolan, Cyganik, Mulliken, Stasiuk, McReynolds, Bertolini, Chudzik, Riley, Dougherty, Body, Statesman.
Boston College– Nguyen, Hager, Mendes, Oldenhoff, Weiderman, Reidy, Smith, Kiley, Valenty, Curran, Daly, Khozozian, Pfefferman, Lane, Jackson.

Champions: Boston College
Staff: Ken Daly (Coach), Jennifer Thomas (Asst. Coach)
Captain: Stephanie Van de Haar (Prop)
Roster: Bethany Caracuzzo (Hooker), Shelly Curran (Flyhalf), Lauren Daly (Wing), Melanie Fiore (Scrumhalf), Beth Hager (Hooker), Rachel Jackson (Fullback), Kelly Khozozian (Center), Laura Kiley (#8), Julie Lane (Wing), Jacqueline Laurencelle (Flanker), Kathleen Mendes (Prop), Nguyen Nguyen (Prop), T.J. Oldenhoff (Lock), Eleanor Pfefferman (Center), Mary Reidy (#8), Charlotte Samper (Wing), Heather Smith (Flanker), Elise Valenty (Scrumhalf), Gail Weiderman (Lock).

== College All–Stars ==
The 1992 National Collegiate All–Star Championship took place at Chicago Blaze's club fields in Lemont, IL from June 19–20. Similar to the All–Star Tournaments for club teams, the college competition is divided into geographic unions and used to select the All–American team that goes on to play other junior national rugby teams. In the final, the Pacific Coast RFU defeated the Eastern RU. Andre Bachelet, scrumhalf for UC Berkeley, was MVP back and Rob Lumkong, #8 for UC Berkeley, was MVP forward.

Semifinals

19 June 1992

Pacific Coast	24–6	West
Try: Jeff Chenu 33'; Rob Affleck 2H'; Andreas Hickel; Jeff Chenu 71' c Eric Harmon 77' c Con: Eric Takeuchi		Pen: Andy Hamann 26', 2H'

Lemont, IL
Referee: Bob Loftus (CARFU)

19 June 1992

East	41–3	Midwest
Try: Nick Bell 9'; Monte Geise 22'; Chip Curtis 37'; Ray Green 42'; Brian Geraghty 47'; Ray Green 55' c Mike Daoust c Chip Curtis 75' c Con: Joel Satin; Pen: Joel Satin 18'		Pen: Russ Howland 2'

Lemont, IL
Referee: Jim Jeffers (HOARFU)

Third place

20 June 1992

West	19–10	Midwest
Try: Ken Helmer c Blair Art 60'; Con: Andy Hamann; Pen: Andy Hamann 37', 42', 51'		Try: Mark Weidner 10' c Pete Karmilowicz 15'; Con: Mark Weidner

Lemont, IL
Referee: Tim Walsh (CARFU)

Final

20 June 1992

Pacific Coast	52–21	East
Try: Rob Lumkong 8'; Rob Lumkong 13'; Andre Bachelet 20' c Rob Swanbeck c David Foster; Josh Martin 41' c Ed Schram 47'; Andre Bachelet 66' c Rob Swanbeck 79' c Con: Andre Bachelet (4); Rob Swanbeck (1); Pen: Rob Swanbeck 58', 62'		Try: Ray Green 71' c Ray Green 77' c Con: Jeff Bronikowski; Pen: Jeff Bronikowski 20', 27', 31'

Lemont, IL
Referee: Bob Loftus (CARFU)

Champions: Pacific Coast College All–Stars
Staff: Jerry Figone (Manager), Dale Toohey (Coach), Mark Webber (Asst. Coach)
Captain: Masanao Morimoto–Flanker (UC Berkeley), Chris King –Flanker (UC Berkeley)
Roster: Centers– Rob Affleck (San Diego University), Ed Schram (UC Berkeley), Robert Swanbeck (UC Berkeley); Scrumhalf- Andre Bachelet (UC Berkeley); Locks- Jonathan Beck (UC Berkeley), David Codevilla (UC Berkeley), Peter Codevilla (UC Berkeley), Kyle Quinn (CSU Long Beach); #8s- Jeff Chenu (UC Berkeley), Robert LumKong (UC Berkeley); Hookers- Charles Foster (UC Berkeley), Chester Koh (UC Berkeley); Wings- David Foster (UC Davis), Andreas Hikel (Oregon State), Anthony Jones (UCLA), Matt Palamountain (UC Berkeley); Fullbacks- Eric Harmon (UC Berkeley), Jerry Lewis (Stanford); Flankers– Josh Martin (UC Berkeley), Charles Murphy (CSU Long Beach), Ralph Weiche (Washington); Props- Ray Lehner (UC Berkeley), David Liebowitz (UC Berkeley), Darren Maloney (UCLA); Flyhalf– Eric Takeuchi (UC San Diego).

== See also ==
1992 National Rugby Championships
