= 1990 National Collegiate Rugby Championship =

Tournament details
- Tournament format(s): Knockout
- Date: May 5 – 6, 1990

Tournament statistics
- Teams: 4
- Matches played: 4

Final
- Venue: Pebble Beach, CA
- Champions: Air Force (2nd title)
- Runners-up: Army

The 1990 National Collegiate Rugby Championship was the eleventh edition of the official national championship for intercollegiate rugby. The tournament, sponsored by Steinlager, took place concurrently with the 32nd Pebble Beach Rugby Classic on Collins Polo Field at Pebble Beach, California from May 5–6. Air Force won the all academy final with a victory over Army. Kimo Gallahue of Army was named Most Valuable Forward while Tim Bohman of Air Force was Most Valuable Back.

== Venue ==
California
Collins Polo Field	1990 National Collegiate Rugby Championship is located in California
Pebble Beach, California	1990 National Collegiate Rugby Championship is located in California
Capacity:	1990 National Collegiate Rugby Championship is located in California

== Participants ==
Army Black Nights

Qualified for the National Championship by advancing from the Eastern College Championship on December 2–3 at Orlando, FL.

- Army 12–3 Harvard
- Army 64-8 Clemson
- Army 9-6 James Madison

Roster:
Coaches- Ross, O'Gorman, Mahan
Captain- Brian Burlingame (Hooker)
Record-
Neal Amodio (Wing), Mike Battles (Scrumhalf), Damion Cordova (Flanker), Tony Detoto (Center), Kimo Gallahue (#8), Martin Guillen (Prop), Mike Kilbane (Fullback), Lance Kohler (Hooker), Marshall Malinowski (#8), Bill Marshall (Wing), Dennis McKernan (#8), Scott Painter (Fullback), Larry Perino (Scrumhalf), Gravelle Pierre (Wing), Mike Roberts (Prop), Jim Saccone (Flyhalf), John Slater (Lock), Scott Sutherland (Flanker), Vinny Torza (Center), Matt Vertin (Lock), Garth Yarnell (Center).

Ohio State

Qualified for the National Championship by winning the Midwest Universities Cup on April 21–22 in Bowling Green, OH.

- Ohio State 10–7 Mankato State
- Ohio State 12–0 Penn State
- Ohio State 10-8 Bowling Green

Roster:
Coaches- Barry Ferguson, Steve Finkel, Charlie Schubert, Tom Rooney (Trainer)
Captain- Mike Vogel
Record- 15–1
Curt Anderson (Flanker), Dan Berner (Flanker), Ron Bowers (Center), Joe Bradley (Fullback), Dave Canning (#8), Mike Dresser (Flyhalf), Shawn Fox (Lock), Kent Garbee (Flyhalf), Steve Gutkoski (Hooker), Russ Howland (Wing), Mike Hudak (Hooker), Takahiro Matsubara (Wing), Jim Merritt (Prop), Dave Millett (Scrumhalf), Tim O'Leary (Center), Eric Pool (Prop), Corey Perry (Lock), Jeff Sharritts (Wing), Jim Skowran (Flanker), Phil Vogel (Flanker), Dan Walsh (Center).

Air Force

Qualified for the National Championship by winning the Western Collegiate Championship on April 14–15 in College Station, TX.

- Air Force 28-0 Missouri–Columbia
- Air Force 16-4 Oklahoma
- Air Force 47-10 Kansas

Roster:
Coach- Vern Francis, Walt Daniels
Captains- Mike Junk (Hooker), Bill Jacobus (Fullback)
Record- 15–2–1
Dan Abraham (Flanker), Dave Almand (Flanker), Tony Baade (Flanker), Harry Blue (Prop), Tim Bentley (Flanker), Tim Bohman (Flyhalf), Albert Fitts (Lock), Andy Haman (Center), Bill Hickman (Wing), Brad Hoagland (Scrumhalf), Eric Kelm (Hooker), Jon Krause (Lock), Mike Kosco (Prop), Rob MacKenzie (Fullback), Andy McArtor (#8), Mike Miller (Flanker), Steve Novak (Prop), Jay Owen (Lock), Bryan Rau (Scrumhalf), Mitch Richardson (Wing), Skip Rogers (Wing), Mark Wiser (Center), Don Wood (Center).

Long Beach 49ers

Qualified from Pacific Coast College Championships on April 21–22 in Richland, WA.

- Long Beach 14-0 Oregon
- Long Beach 23-12 Stanford
- Long Beach 16-14 California

Roster:
Coach- Anderson, Stackhouse
Captain-Brett Bowden(Flyhalf)
Record- 33-0
Steve Agor (Wing), Timothy Aitken (Center), Quinn Clark (#8), Tom Edginton (Lock), Jerry Fanning (Hooker), Nick Green (Flanker), Jimmy Guadagno (Scrumhalf), David Guerra (Prop), Craig Hutchinson (Lock), Mark Joffe (Wing), John Kenney (Scrumhalf), John Kenney (Center), Mike Lewis (Center), Jeffrey Martin (Prop), Dan O'Brien (Fullback), Kevin Robinson (Center), Eric Skaar (Flanker), Otto Smith (Flanker), Chris Stratton (Wing), Kyle Swain (Scrumhalf), Dean P. Toohey (Flanker).

== Bracket ==
Regional Semifinal
April 14 - College Station, TX
Air Force	16
Oklahoma	4
April 14 - College Station, TX
Kansas	19
Colorado U	6
April 21 - Bowling Green, OH
Ohio State	12
Penn State	0
April 21 - Bowling Green, OH
Bowling Green	26
Dayton	9
December 2 - Orlando, FL
Army	64
Clemson	8
December 2 - Orlando, FL
James Madison	32
Lehigh	15
April 19 - Richland, WA
Long Beach	23
Stanford	12
April 19 - Richland, WA
California	31
Chico State	6

Regional Final
April 15 - College Station, TX
Air Force	47
Kansas	10
April 22 - Bowling Green, OH
Ohio State	10
Bowling Green	8
December 3 - Orlando, FL
Army	9
James Madison	6
April 19 - Richland, WA
Long Beach	16
California	14

National Semifinal
May 5 – Pebble Beach, CA
Air Force (West)	37
Ohio State (Midwest)	32
May 5 – Pebble Beach, CA
Army (East)	20
Long Beach (Pacific)	18

National Final
May 6 – Pebble Beach, CA
Air Force	18
Army	12
Third place
May 6 – Pebble Beach, CA
Ohio State	7
Long Beach	3

== Semifinals ==
5 May 1990
12:10 PM

Air Force	37–32	Ohio State
Try: Skip Rogers 22' c Al Fitts 28' c Skip Rogers; Dan Wood c Mark Wiser 58' c Tim Bohman 60' c Con: Tim Bohman; Pen: Tim Bohman 9'		Try: Jeff Sharritt 14' c Jeff Sharritt 17' c Dave Millet c Dave Canning; Joe Bradley; Con: Joe Bradley; Drop: Russ Howland; Ron Bowers

Collins Field, Pebble Beach, CA
Referee: Dave Head (SCRFU)

5 May 1990
1:45 PM

Army	20–18	Long Beach
Try: Gravelle Pierre 47'; Bill Marshall 56'; Gravelle Pierre 74' c Pen: Mike Kilbane 15', 22'		Try: Dean Toohey 36'; Chris Stratton 64'; Dean Toohey 80'; Pen: Brett Bowden 17', 44'

Collins Field, Pebble Beach, CA
Referee: Jim Russell (WRFU)

== Third place ==
6 May 1990
9:10 AM

Ohio State	7–3	Long Beach
Try: Jeff Sharritt 48'; Pen: Joe Bradley 5'		Pen: Brett Bowden 42'

Collins Field, Pebble Beach, CA
Referee: Dave Head (USARFU)

== Final ==
6 May 1990
12:00 PM

Air Force	18–12	Army
Try: Mike Junk 35'; Tim Bohman; Bill Jacobus c Tim Bohman; Con: Skip Rogers		Try: Garth Yarnell c Con: Mike Kilbane; Pen: Mike Kilbane 6', 20'

Collins Field, Pebble Beach, CA
Attendance: 2000
Referee: Jim Russell (WRFU)

== College All–Stars ==
The 1990 Collegiate All–Star Championship took place in San Diego, CA from June 15–17. Similar to the Inter Territorial Tournaments for club teams, the college competition is divided into geographic unions and used to select the All–American team that goes on to play other junior national rugby teams. In the final, the Eastern RU defeated the Pacific RFU. The final standings were 1st East, 2nd Pacific, 3rd Midwest and 4th West.

15 June 1990

Pacific Coast	34–7	West
Try: Chris Willians 3'; Joe Santos 19'; Ray Lehner 26'; Chris Williams 29' c Mas Morimoto 50'; Ray Lehner 59' c Joe Santos c Con: Michael Brewin		Try: Jeff Paxton 65' c Pen: Mark Palmer 17'

San Diego, CA
Referee: Loftus (Midwest)

15 June 1990

East	16–14	Midwest
Try: Mike Lambert 9'; Penalty try 65' c Con: Jamie Goodman; Pen: Jamie Goodman 70', 80'		Try: Dave Gosch 22'; Andrew Jackman; Dave Gosch c Con: Ron Bowers

San Diego, CA
Referee: Dave Head (Pacific Coast)

16 June 1990

Pacific Coast	40–4	Midwest
Try: Tom Short 16'; Jerry Fanning 20'; Tom Short c Tom Short c Fas Tagaloa c Chris Williams 64'; Tom Short 68' c Scott Bracken; Con: Michael Brewin		Try: Wes Harmon 71'

San Diego, CA
Referee: John Bloomfield (Pacific Coast)

16 June 1990

East	29–4	West
Try: Pat Thomas 9'; Hikaru Ogata 13' c Gabe Puello c ? 74'; Con: Jamie Goodman; Pen: Jamie Goodman 1H', 1H', 49'		Try: Jeff Paxton 45'

San Diego, CA
Referee: Gary Andrews (Pacific Coast)

17 June 1990

West	4–10	Midwest
Try: Jeff Paxton 20'		Try: Dave Gosch 14'; Pen: Joe Bradley 4', 1H'

San Diego, CA
Referee: John Bloomfield (Pacific Coast)

17 June 1990

East	17–12	Pacific Coast
Try: Wally Lester 23'; Mike Lambert 43'; Dan Cockerell 58' c Con: Jamie Goodman; Pen: Jamie Goodman 19'		Try: Mas Morimoto c Jim Moorehouse 80' c Con: Todd Perruchon

San Diego, CA
Referee: Dave Head (Pacific Coast)

Champions: Eastern College All–Stars
Staff: Ken Daly (Manager), Martin Kingston (Coach), Flanagan (Coach)
Roster: Chris Andres-Wing (James Madison), Dave Childress-Flanker (Florida), Dan Cockerell-Center (Boston U), Dardon Couch-Lock/Flanker (George Mason), Robert Cullum-Prop (Trinity Connecticut), Tim Dippel-Lock (Loyola Maryland), Jamie Goodman-Fullback (Dartmouth), Jon Greenberg-Prop (Harvard), Chris Heinrich-Prop (Dartmouth), Orlando Hidalgo-Center (Florida), Eric Johnson-Flanker (Columbia), Karl King-Prop (Loyola Maryland), Steve Laake-Fullback (Loyola Maryland), Mike Lambert-#8 (Holy Cross), Walter Lester-Wing (Boston U), Anthony Leva-Flank/#8 (Siena), Francis Mayer-Scrumhalf (LSU), James Mullen-Scrumhalf (Siena), Hikaru Ogata-Flyhalf (Brown), Denis Peyreux-Wing (LSU), Gabe Puello-Lock (Florida International), Steve Saraisky-Flanker (Dartmouth), John Schaefer-Wing (Dartmouth), Greg Schor-Center (Hofstra), Jeff Soeken-Lock (Maryland), Pat Thomas-#8 (Maryland), Glen Wolland-Hooker (Boston U), Rob Young–Hooker (Georgia).

== See also ==
1990 National Rugby Championships
