= 1983 National Collegiate Rugby Championship =

Tournament details
- Tournament format(s): Knockout
- Date: May 8 – 9, 1983

Tournament statistics
- Teams: 4
- Matches played: 4

Final
- Venue: Athens, GA
- Champions: California (4th title)
- Runners-up: Air Force

The 1983 National Collegiate Rugby Championship was the fourth edition of the official national championship for intercollegiate rugby organized by the U.S. Rugby Football Union. The tournament was hosted by the University of Georgia in Athens, Georgia. The Cal Bears won their fourth straight title.

== Venue ==
Georgia
UGA Intramural Field	1983 National Collegiate Rugby Championship is located in Georgia
Athens, Georgia	1983 National Collegiate Rugby Championship is located in Georgia
Capacity:	1983 National Collegiate Rugby Championship is located in Georgia

== Participants ==
Illinois
Qualified for the National Championship by advancing from the Mid-America Cup at Bowling Green, Ohio on May 1.

- Illinois 14-0 Cincinnati
- Illinois 7-10 Palmer(awarded to Illinois due to ineligible players on Palmer)

Roster:
Coach- Graham Hesketh
Alan Burton (Fullback), Dan Cummiskey (Wing), Brent Doden (Center), Tom Erf (Flanker), Bruce Gillingham (Flanker), Graham Hesketh (Flyhalf), Randy Hopkins (Lock), Jeff Javior (Wing), Ed Kohout (#8), Marty Lyons (Wing), Mike McEnerney (Flanker), Kevin McSweeney (Scrumhalf), Rick Mihevc (Flyhalf), Pat Odom (Wing), Ed Pacer (Flanker), Dave Podber (Flanker), Tom Quinn (Lock), J.W. Sears (Hooker), Tony Sparrow (Flanker), Matt Struve (Prop), Lenny Unes (Hooker), Doc Watson (Prop).

Navy
Qualified for the National Championship by winning the Eastern Collegiate Championship April 30–May 1 in Philadelphia, PA.

- Navy W–L UMass Amherst
- Navy 22–12 James Madison

Roster:
Coach- Kehoe
Pat Buckley (Scrumhalf), Mike Coughlin (Wing), Todd Davis (Flanker), Eric Dunn (Lock), Will Hall (#8), Rob Haskins (Fullback), Brian Hodges (Lock), Gardner Howe (Flyhalf), Randy King (Flyhalf), Malcolm LeMay (Flanker), Chuck Lynch (Prop), Mike McGivney (Flanker), Brian Murphy (Lock), Bill Murray (Wing), Bob Papadakis (Hooker), Joe Rixey (Center), John Scanlan (Hooker), Kevin Smith (Scrumhalf), Will Smith (Wing), Jim Stewart (Center), Doug Suriano (Prop).

Air Force
Qualified for the National Championship by winning the Western Regional on April 23–24 at College Station, TX.

- Air Force 6-0 Southeast Missouri State
- Air Force 9-4 Nebraska
- Air Force 13-9 Oklahoma

Roster:
Coach- Rob Horne
Captains- Joe Barkate/Luis Arauz
Record- 9–1
Luis Arauz (Flanker), Joe Barkate (Flyhalf), Pete Bartos (Wing), Dave Burns (#8), Paul Carrubba (Lock), Chris Cordes (Scrumhalf), Bob Desantis (Prop), Dick Fish (Flanker), Joel Heck (Scrumhalf), Jeff Ingalls (Hooker), Bob Jolly (#8), Mark Knofczynski (Prop), Jim Koehn (Fullback), Bob MacDonald (Lock), Keith McCoy (Prop), Tom W. Miller (Center), Mike Murray (Wing), John Savidge (Center), Mike Trundy (Flyhalf), William Volker (Hooker), Joe Wendlberger (Flanker), Bob Williamson (Wing).

California
Qualified from Pacific Coast Collegiate Regional at Provo, Utah on April 8–9.

- California 20-0 Oregon State
- California 44-6 BYU

Roster:
Coach- Ned Anderson
Captain- John Blackburn
Record 17-6(7–0)
Bill Bicker (Center), John Blackburn (Flanker), Mark Carlson (Flanker), Marc Covert (Wing), Jim Di Matteo (Scrumhalf), Steve Ellis (Center), Kevin Fox (Prop), Rich Hextrum (#8), Brian Hillesland (Lock), Don James (Prop), Ed Kerwin (Center), Mark Lamborne (Hooker), Greg Loberg (Lock), David Loomis (Fullback), Doug McKenzie (Hooker), John Metheny (Flyhalf), Hugh Preston (Flyhalf), John Riddering (Lock), George Roeth (Wing), Mike Sidley (Prop), Bob Tanaka (Scrumhalf) Greg Van Inwegen (Flanker), Brian Walgenbach (Prop), Ron Zenker (Lock), Mark Zouvas (Prop).

== Bracket ==
Regional Semifinal
April 8 - Provo, UT
California	17
Oregon State	0
April 8 - Provo, UT
BYU	20
Long Beach	16
May 1 - Bowling Green, OH
Palmer	9
Michigan	0
May 1 - Bowling Green, OH
Chicago	3
Ohio State	0
April 24 - College Station, TX
Air Force	12
Nebraska	4
April 24 - College Station, TX
Oklahoma	12
Kansas State	0
April 30 - Philadelphia, PA
Navy	W
UMass Amherst	L
April 30 - Philadelphia, PA
James Madison	W
Florida State	L

Regional Final
April 9 - Provo, UT
California	44
BYU	6
May 1 - Bowling Green, OH
Palmer	36
Chicago	3
April 24 - College Station, TX
Air Force	13
Oklahoma	9
May 1 – Philadelphia, PA
Navy	22
James Madison	12

National Semifinal
May 8 – Athens, GA
California (Pacific)	20
Illinois (Midwest)	0
May 8 – Athens, GA
Air Force (West)	6
Navy (East)	3

National Final
May 9 – Athens, GA
California	13
Air Force	3
Third place
May 9 – Athens, GA
Navy	32
Illinois	3

== Semifinals ==
8 May 1983

Air Force	6–3	Navy
Pen: Bob Williamson 60', 79'		Drop: Joe Rixey 56'

Athens, GA
Referee: Tim Gallagher (Indiana)

8 May 1983

California	20–0	Illinois
Try: Mark Zouvas 54'; Mark Covert 63'; John Blackburn 70' c Bill Bicker 74' c Con: Hugh Preston (2/4)

Athens, GA
Referee: Jim Russell

== Third place ==
9 May 1983

Navy	32–3	Illinois
Try: Murray 38' c Stewart 41'; Bill Murray 50' c Todd Davis 55' c Howe 63' c Bill Murray 71'; Con: Bob Haskins (4/5)		Pen: Hesketh 18'

Athens, GA
Referee: Tim Gallagher (Indiana)

== Final ==
9 May 1983
2:00 PM

California	13–3	Air Force
Try: Dave Lumus 63' c Mark Lambourne 70'; Con: Hugh Preston (1/2); Pen: Hugh Preston		Pen: Bob Williamson

Athens, GA

== See also ==
1983 National Rugby Championships
