= 1986 National Rugby Championships =

Rugby tournaments in the United States

Tournament details
- Tournament format(s): Various
- Date: 1986

Tournament statistics

Final

The 1986 National Rugby Championships were a series of tournaments organized to determine a national champion in several divisions for United States rugby teams. The divisions included Men's/Women's Club, college, high school, Military, Sevens, and Interterritorial.

== Men's Club ==
The 1986 National Club Rugby Championship was sponsored by Michelob and took place at Pepin Rood Stadium of Tampa University in Florida from May 10–11. The teams featured in the tournament were the champions of the four sub unions of USARFU. The Old Blues rugby club of Berkeley, CA won the title for the sixth time.

Regional Semifinal
April 26 – Pasadena, CA
Old Blues (CA)	12
Belmont Shore	6
April 26 – Pasadena, CA
San Francisco	19
Los Angeles	12
April 26 – Milwaukee, WI
Milwaukee RC	21
Cincinnati Wolfhounds	4
April 26 – Milwaukee, WI
Louisville	8
Scioto Valley	0
April 26 – Conshohocken, PA
Old Blue (NY)	7
Washington	3
April 26 – Conshohocken, PA
Life College	17
Norfolk City Blues	0
April 26 – Oklahoma City, OK
Dallas Harlequins	12
Boulder	6
April 26 – Oklahoma City, OK
Denver Barbarians	18
Kansas City Blues	12

Regional Final
April 27 – Pasadena, CA
Old Blues (CA)	45
San Francisco	0
April 27 – Milwaukee, WI
Milwaukee RC	9
Louisville	6
April 27 – Conshohocken, PA
Old Blue (NY)	7
Life College	6
April 27 – Oklahoma City, OK
Dallas Harlequins	21
Denver Barbarians	6

National Semifinal
May 10 - Tampa, FL
Old Blues (CA)	26
Milwaukee RC	13
May 10 - Tampa, FL
Old Blue (NY)	10
Dallas Harlequins	7

National Final
May 11 - Tampa, FL
Old Blues (CA)	20
Old Blue (NY)	0
Third place
May 11 - Tampa, FL
Dallas Harlequins	7
Milwaukee RC	7

=== Semifinals ===
10 May 1986

New York Old Blue	10–7	Dallas Harlequins
Try: Mike Stewart 57'; Pen: Hugh O'Neill 21', 84'		Try: John Scheef 73'; Pen: Gawie Visagie 4'

Pepin Rood Stadium, Tampa, FL
Referee: Don Morrison

10 May 1986

Berkeley Old Blues	26–13	Milwaukee
Try: Roy Helu 9'; Matt Taylor 26' c Gary Townsend 40'+ Roy Helu 46' c Con: Gary Townsend; Pen: Gary Townsend 17', 81'		Try: Bob Bilda 81'; Pen: Simon Bailey (3)

Pepin Rood Stadium, Tampa, FL
Referee: Ian Nixon

=== Third place ===
11 May 1986

Dallas Harlequins	7–7	Milwaukee
Try: Andy Bynum 30'; Pen: Gawie Visagie 17'		Try: Drew Howie 82'; Pen: Simon Bailey 77'

Pepin Rood Stadium, Tampa, FL
Referee: Don Morrison

=== Final ===
11 May 1986
6:00PM

Berkeley Old Blues	20–0	New York Old Blue
Try: Mark Richter 14'; Isi Havili 19' c Roy Helu 39'; Con: Gary Townsend; Pen: Gary Townsend 36', 84'

Pepin Rood Stadium, Tampa, FL
Referee: Ian Nixon

Champions: Old Blues (CA)
Staff: Jeff Hollings (Coach), Bill Armstrong (Asst. Coach)
Captain: Whit Everett
Roster: Rick Bailey (Prop), Mark Bass (Flanker), Dave Bateman (Scrumhalf), John Blackburn (Flanker), Randy Coste (Prop), Mark Deaton (#8), John Everett (Hooker), Whit Everett (Flanker), Isi Havili (Prop), Sammy Havili (Lock), Roy Helu (Center), Chuck Hextrum (Lock), Stanley Lolahola (#8), Tim Mascheroni (Fullback), Mike McClintock (Hooker), Bo Meyersieck (Flyhalf), Ken Meyersieck (Scrumhalf), Dave Mogni (Center), Dave Morze (Lock), Tim O'Brien (Center), Mark Richter (Wing), Matt Taylor (Wing), Gary Townsend (Center/Wing), Art Ward (Lock/#8), Blane Warhurst (Flanker), Jeff Westcott (Wing).

== Women's Club ==
The 1986 Women's National Rugby Championship was a tournament that took place at Fort Adams State Park on May 24–25 in Newport, RI. Beantown won the title by defeating Florida State 8–4 in overtime. The Eugene Housewives took third place with a 34–0 win over Denver Old Girls. Jan Rutkowski of Beantown was MVP.

Quarter-finals
May 24 – Newport, RI
Beantown	W
Chicago	L
May 24 – Newport, RI
Denver Old Girls	W
Bay Area SheHawks	L
May 24 – Newport, RI
Florida State	W
Minnesota	L
May 24 – Newport, RI
Eugene Housewives	18
New Orleans Half Moons	15

Semi-finals
May 24 – Newport, RI
Beantown	36
Denver Old Girls	0
May 24 – Newport, RI
Florida State	8
Eugene Housewives	0

Final
May 25 – Newport, RI
Beantown	8
Florida State	4
Third place
May 25 – Newport, RI
Denver Old Girls	0
Eugene Housewives	34

=== Final ===
25 May 1986

Beantown	8–4	Florida State
Try: Jan Rutkowski 80'; Kerri Heffernan OT'		Try: Candi Orsini 65'

Newport, RI
Referee: Don Morrison (USARFU)

Lineups:
Beantown- Flaven, Money, Kimball, Richardson, Thorley, Heffernan, Bridi, Rutkowski, McClure, Madden, Ramsey, Morrissey, Keith, Keefe, Crawford.
Florida State- Hill, Kossman, Gilbert, Pace, Kojm, Morton, Watts, Flores, Holmes, Jakubcin, Arnsdorff, Orsini, Alley, Smith, Bowlin.

== College ==
The 1986 College championship was won by California. Dartmouth was runner-up.

== Military ==
The 1986 National Military Rugby Championship was a twenty team tournament that took place at Kelly Air Force base in San Antonio, TX from May 10–11 and was won by Pensacola Naval Air Station with a 19–6 win over Fort Sill Gunners in the Club Division while The Mike Stephenson President's Fifteen won the Open Division defeating US Coast Guard Select 17–9 in the final. In the Chairman's Cup competition for kickers Gary Holmes of USN-Pensacola won the drop kicking contest, and Mike Schmidt of ORCHAS - US Army was the best place kicker.

Club Division

Standings											
Rank	Team	Pld	W	L	T	F	A	D-M	FTH	FTB	PAR
1.	Davis-Monthan Mandrills	3	3	0	0	43	0	X	12:0	18:0	13:0
2.	Fort Hood	3	1	1	1	4	12	0:12	X	0:0	4:0
3.	Fort Benning	3	1	1	1	10	18	0:18	0:0	X	10:0
4.	Parris Island	3	0	3	0	0	27	0:13	0:4	0:10	X

Standings											
Rank	Team	Pld	W	L	T	F	A	CPL	USU	HAW	3RD
1.	Camp Lejeune	3	2	1	0	15	3	X	0:3	9:0	6:0
2.	USUHS	3	2	1	0	19	11	3:0	X	7:8	9:3
3.	Hawaiian ORCHAS	3	1	1	1	43	23	0:9	8:7	X	3:3
4.	3rd FSSG	3	0	2	1	6	18	0:6	3:9	3:3	X

Standings											
Rank	Team	Pld	W	L	T	F	A	FTS	PEN	CAP	MIN
1.	Fort Sill Gunners	3	3	0	0	25	13	X	12:10	3:0	10:3
2.	Pensacola	3	1	1	1	51	18	10:12	X	3:3	38:3
3.	Camp Pendleton	2	1	1	1	3	6	0:3	3:3	X	w/o
4.	Minot	2	0	3	0	6	48	3:10	3:38	w/o	X

Standings											
Rank	Team	Pld	W	L	T	F	A	MON	CPO	SAN	FTC
1.	Monterey Fort Ord	2	3	0	0	51	6	X	10:0	18:0	w/o
2.	Cherry Point	2	2	1	0	4	13	0:10	X	4:3	w/o
3.	San Antonio	2	1	2	0	3	22	0:18	3:4	X	w/o
4.	Fort Campbell	0	0	3	0	0	0	w/o	w/o	w/o	X

Standings											
Rank	Team	Pld	W	L	T	F	A	FTC	FTB	W-P	HAW
1.	Fort Carson Ironhorses	3	3	0	0	21	0	X	3:0	6:0	12:0
2.	Fort Bragg	3	1	2	0	21	19	0:3	X	12:6	9:10
3.	Wright-Patterson	3	1	2	0	12	18	0:6	6:12	X	6:0
4.	Hawaii Marines	3	1	2	0	10	27	0:12	10:9	0:6	X

Quarter-finals
May 11 – San Antonio, TX
Pensacola	6
Davis Monthan	4
May 11 – San Antonio, TX
Fort Carson	6
Camp Lejeune	0
May 11 – San Antonio, TX
Fort Sill	10
USUHS	0
May 11 – San Antonio, TX
Monterey	21
Cherry Point	0

Semi-finals
May 11 – San Antonio, TX
Pensacola	13
Fort Carson	6
May 11 – San Antonio, TX
Fort Sill	7
Monterey	3

Final
May 11 – San Antonio, TX
Pensacola	19
Fort Sill	6

Club Division Champions: Pensacola Naval Air Station
Roster: Donald Schleicher, Gary Holmes, Shay, Crockett, P.J. Mulloy, Richard Haddad, Jack McGonagle, Tim Decelle,

Open Division

Standings											
Rank	Team	Pld	W	L	T	F	A	TMS	COA	RAR	SWP
1.	Mike Stephenson XV	3	3	0	0	60	3	X	3:0	18:0	39:3
2.	Coast Guard Select	3	2	1	0	21	19	0:3	X	18:0	38:0
3.	Rent-A-Rugger	3	1	2	0	12	18	0:18	0:18	X	0:0
4.	Scott/Wright-Pat B	3	1	2	0	10	27	3:39	0:38	0:0	X

Standings											
Rank	Team	Pld	W	L	T	F	A	BLA	HOB	3FB	PIC
1.	USAF Black Sheep	3	3	0	0	42	3	X	12:3	26:0	4:0
2.	Holloman AFB/Ft. Bliss	3	2	1	0	10	12	3:12	X	3:0	4:0
3.	3rd FSSG B	3	?	2	0	0	29	0:26	0:3	X	?
4.	Pickup Team	3	?	2	0	0	8	0:4	0:4	?	X

Semifinals
May 11 – San Antonio, TX
Mike Stephenson	35
Holloman/Bliss	5
May 11 – San Antonio, TX
Coast Guard	6
Black Sheep	0

Final
May 11 – San Antonio, TX
Mike Stephenson	17
Coast Guard	9

Open Division Champions: The Mike Stephenson President's Fifteen
Roster: Brzewski, Foster, Gorecki, Riley, Trumps, Winger

The 1986 Interservice Rugby Championship was held at Fort McNair in Washington D.C. from 6–7 September. The teams involved were select sides of each service branch. From these teams a selection was made to field the Combined Services Rugby team for tours.
Round robin 6 Sep

- Coast Guard 13–3 Navy
- Coast Guard 21–0 Air Force
- Coast Guard 7–10 Army
- Marines 9–0 Air Force
- Marines 18–0 Navy
- Marines 9–4 Army
- Coast Guard 10–6 Marines
- Army 16–10 Air Force
- Army W–L Navy
- Air Force W–L Navy

Third place 7 Sep

- Army 16–6 Air Force

Championship

7 September 1986

Marines	19–7	Coast Guard
Try: Bill Fell; Don Schleicher; Don Schleicher; Pen: Scott Lance (2)		Try: (1); Pen: (1)

Fort McNair, Washington, DC

1. Marines (4–1) 2. Coast Guard (3–2) 3. Army (4–1) 4. Air Force (1–4) 5. Navy (0–4)

== Sevens ==
Club
The 1986 National Club Seven–a–side championship was played in Milwaukee, Wisconsin on 30 August. There were eight teams featured which included two representatives from each of the four territorial unions. The Quad City Irish defeated the Denver Barbarians 25–10 to win the championship. Life College finished third by defeating OMBAC 12–8. The MVPs were Ollie Taveres of Quad City and Dave Poquette of Denver.

First round:

- OMBAC 22–6 Oklahoma
- Quad City 20–10 Sud Americano
- Life 18–15 Dayton
- Denver 12–10 Old Puget Sound Beach

Second round:

- Quad City 20–10 OMBAC
- Denver 10–6(OT) Life
- Sud Americano 13–12 Oklahoma
- Old Puget Sound Beach 16–10 Dayton

Third round:

- Oklahoma 24–0 Dayton (Seventh place)
- Sud Americano 18–12 Old Puget Sound Beach (Fifth place)
- Life 12–8 OMBAC (Third place)

=== Final ===
30 August 1986

Quad City Irish	25–10	Denver Barbarians
Try: Ollie Tavares; Bill Ewan c Dave Watkins; Dan Kilen; Dan Kilen; Con: Ollie Tavares; Pen: Ollie Tavares		Try: Ron Biersdorf; Mike Tatro c Con: Mike Tatro

Hi Corbett Stadium, Tucson, AZ
Referee: Ian Nixon (USARFU)

Champions: Quad-City Irish
Coach:Bob Horn Cecil Youngblood
Roster: Ollie Tavares (Hooker), John Bradley (Hooker), Dave Sarafin (Scrumhalf), Bill Ewan (Flyhalf), Dave Houssler (Moline), Dave Watkins (Forward), Dan Kilen (Center), Neil Early (Moline), Cecil Youngblood (Prop).

Rank	Team	W	L	F	A
1	Quad City Irish (Iowa)	3	0	65	30
2	Denver Barbarians (Colorado)	2	1	32	41
3	Life College (Georgia)	2	1	36	33
4	OMBAC (San Diego)	1	2	40	38
5	Sud Americano (Washington D.C.)	2	1	41	44
6	Old Puget Sound Beach (Seattle)	1	2	38	40
7	Oklahoma University	1	2	42	35
8	Dayton (Ohio)	0	3	25	58

All Star
The 1986 National All-Star Sevens Rugby Tournament was an eight team tournament with two representatives from each territory that took place in Tucson, AZ on November 8. Similar to the ITTs, the other purpose of the tournament was to select members for the U.S. Eagles Seven–a–side team. The eight teams played two rounds of games and then were paired off in placement matches. The East I team won the final over the Midwest I team. Pacific Coast I came in third.

First round:

- Pacific Coast A 34–0 Midwest B
- East A 34–6 West B
- West A 10–12 East B
- Midwest A 20–0 Pacific Coast B

Second round:

- Midwest B 16–6 West B
- West A 18–4 Pacific Coast B
- Midwest A 18–10 East B
- East A 18–8 Pacific Coast A

Third round:

- Pacific Coast B 12–10 West B (Seventh place)
- West A 20–8 Midwest B (Fifth place)
- Pacific Coast A 18–10 East B (Third place)

=== Final ===
8 November 1986

East A	22–10	Midwest A
Try: Will Brewington c Chris Albrittain; Mark Gaetjen c Will Brewington c Con: Will Brewington; Mark Gaetjen		Try: Dave Sarafin c Dave Watkins c Con: John Bradley

Hi Corbett Stadium, Tucson, AZ
Referee: Ian Nixon (USARFU)

Champions: East A
Coach: Emil Signes
Roster: Chris Albrittain–Prop (NOVA), Bill Bernhard–Wing (Washington), Will Brewington–Hooker (MOB), Mark Gaetjen–Center (NOVA), Gary Lambert–Prop (Life), Dan Parris–Scrumhalf (NOVA), Chris Petrakes–Forward (MOB), Charlie Wilkenson–Flyhalf (NOVA), Jim Wilkenson–Back (NOVA).

== ITT ==
The Inter Territorial Tournament involved the four regional rugby unions comprising the United States RFU: Pacific Coast RFU, Western RFU, Midwest RFU, and the Eastern Rugby Union. The region teams are formed with players selected from the sub regional rugby unions. Subsequently, the USA Eagles are selected from the four regional teams after the ITT concludes. In 1986 the tournament took place at the Orlando Renegades practice field in Orlando, FL from February 15–17. The Pacific Coast Grizzlies won the tournament for the second year in a row and nine of the last ten. The Pacific Coast RFU won the Junior Tournament for players under the age of 25.

Results:

15 February 1986
1:00PM

Eastern	11–4	Western
Try: Greg Pascale 17'; Lance Manga 79'; Pen: Dick Cooke 28'		Try: Pete Knudsen 6'

Orlando, FL
Referee: Keith Morrison (Canada)

15 February 1986
2:30PM

Pacific Coast	37–0	Midwest
Try: Denis Shanagher 27'; Kevin Higgins 50' c Randy Morris 62' c Denis Shanagher 68' c John Mickel c Con: Joe Clarkson (4/5); Pen: Joe Clarkson 5', 45'; Drop: Joe Clarkson 53'

Orlando, FL
Referee: Don Morrison (ERU)

16 February 1986
1:00PM

Western	6–22	Pacific Coast
Pen: Scott Bertrand 19', 27'		Try: Carl Crumpacker 1' c Rick Crivellone 53'; Con: Gary Townsend; Pen: Gary Townsend 5', 8', 21', 44'

Orlando, FL
Referee: Keith Morrison (Canada)

16 February 1986
2:30PM

Midwest	6–22	Eastern
Pen: Joe Scheitlin 49', 56'		Try: Bill Bernhard 21'; Jack White 54' c Chris Doherty 62' c Con: Bill Bernhard (2/3); Pen: Bill Bernhard 40', 76'

Orlando, FL
Referee: Don Reordan

17 February 1986
12:00PM

Pacific Coast	17–3	Eastern
Try: John Mickel 30'; Gary Hein 39'; Kevin Higgins 71' c Con: Joe Clarkson (1/3); Drop: Joe Clarkson 4'		Pen: Greg Pascale 13'

Orlando, FL
Referee: Ian Nixon

17 February 1986
1:30PM

Western	3–19	Midwest
Pen: Ray Nelson 43'		Try: Mike Kavanaugh 19' c Roger Castino 67'; Roger Castino 77' c Con: Bill Jhung (2/3); Pen: Bill Jhung

Orlando, FL
Referee: Don Morrison (ERU)

Champions: Pacific Coast Grizzlies
Staff: Peter Sertic (Manager), Bing Dawson (Coach), Jay Waldron (Asst. Coach), Jim Bezel (Trainer), John Chase (Doctor)
Roster: Rick Bailey (Old Blues), Mark Bass (Old Blues), Ed Burlingham (Back Bay), Joe Clarkson (Los Angeles), Rick Crivellone (Portland), Carl Crumpacker (OMBAC), Mark Deaton (Old Blues), Pete Deddeh (OMBAC), Gary Hein (Cal), Roy Helu (Old Blues), Kevin Higgins (Cal Poly), John Jelaco (Los Angeles), Mike McClintock (Old Blues), Pete McLaughlin (Seahawks), Bo Meyersieck (Old Blues), Randy Morris (Belmont Shore), John Mickel (Los Angeles), Dave Ochs (OMBAC), Mike Purcell (BATS), Tod Samet (San Francisco), Mike Saunders (OMBAC), Denis Shanagher (BATS), Bill Shiflet (Sacramento), Matt Taylor (Old Blues), Gary Townsend (Old Blues), Brian Vizard (OMBAC), Blane Warhurst (Old Blues), Kent Weyand (OMBAC).

Team		W	L	F	A
1	Pacific Coast Grizzlies	3	0	76	9
2	Eastern Colonials	2	1	36	27
3	Midwest Thunderbirds	1	2	25	62
4	Western Mustangs	0	3	13	52

== High School ==
The 1986 National High School Rugby Championship was a 12-team tournament that took place in Cupertino, CA. The Highland squad from Salt Lake City won the championship by defeating Burlingame of California in the final.

Quarter-finals
May 16 – Cupertino, CA
Burlingame	35
Gunderson	0
May 16 – Cupertino, CA
Redwood
College Park
May 16 – Cupertino, CA
Highland	9
Orem	0
May 16 – Cupertino, CA
Vacaville
Los Gatos

Semi-finals
May 17 – Cupertino, CA
Burlingame	14
Redwood	6
May 17 – Cupertino, CA
Highland	10
Vacaville	4

Final
May 17 – Cupertino, CA
Burlingame	0
Highland	17

=== Final ===
17 May 1986

Burlingame	0–17	Highland
		Try: Garth Hubert; Otu Fihaki; Jeff Brown; Con: Mike Pembroke; Pen: Mike Pembroke

Cupertino, CA
