= USA Club Rugby 7s =

American rugby sevens championship tournament

- Sport: Rugby sevens
- Instituted: 1985; 41 years ago
- Inaugural season: 1985
- Number of teams: 32 (16 Men's; 16 Women's)
- Country: United States (USA Rugby)
- Champions: Old Blue of New York (3rd title) Men Scion Sirens (5th title) Women (2026)
- Most titles: Seattle Saracens (8)
- Website: usaclub7s.com

The USA Club Rugby 7s National Championship is the top annual American rugby sevens competition organized by USA Rugby. It involves the best sixteen men's and women's clubs (32 clubs total) in the United States.

First played in November 1985, the tournament moved to the summer in 1986 and has been a fixture of the summer rugby season in the United States ever since. After a few years of informal women's invitationals, a formal women's competition was added to the event in 2011. The event is streamed online annually, typically on YouTube or The Rugby Channel.

== Results — Men ==
Year	Champion	Score	Runner up	Tournament MVP	Location	Ref
1985	Old Mission Beach Athletic	26-12	Duck Brothers Rugby		Tucson, AZ	
1986	Quad City Irish	25-10	Denver Barbarians		Milwaukee, WI	
1987	Duck Brothers Rugby	18-10	Denver Barbarians		Milwaukee, WI	
1988	Old Puget Sound Beach Rugby	19-6	Denver Barbarians		Milwaukee, WI	
1989	Maryland Old Boys	26-12	Northern Virginia Rugby	Vinny Granger	Alexandria, VA	
1990	Old Puget Sound Beach Rugby	18-10	Northern Virginia Rugby		Alexandria, VA	
1991	Old Puget Sound Beach Rugby	26-6	Northern Virginia Rugby		Alexandria, VA	
1992	Old Puget Sound Beach Rugby	15-6	Old Blues Rugby (CA)		Alexandria, VA	
1993	Old Blue of New York	40-22	Kansas City Blues		Hartford, CT	
1994	Old Blues Rugby (CA)	31-0	Maryland Exiles		Palo Alto, CA	
1995	Old Mission Beach Athletic	35-19	Northern Virginia Rugby	Maliki Delhi	Philadelphia, PA	
1996	Northern Virginia Rugby	26-21	Old Mission Beach Athletic	Prince Hill	Philadelphia, PA	
1997	San Mateo Rugby	57-7	Fresno Rugby		Philadelphia, PA	
1998	San Mateo Rugby	29-7	Tempe Old Devils		Philadelphia, PA	
1999	Philadelphia Whitemarsh Rugby	26-19	Northern Virginia Rugby	Keith McLean	Philadelphia, PA	
2000	Old Mission Beach Athletic	27-17	Sacramento Capitals [DQ]		Philadelphia, PA	
2001	Old Mission Beach Athletic	17-7	Denver Barbarians	Jone Naqica (Denver)	Philadelphia, PA	
2002	Old Mission Beach Athletic	54-0	Maryland Exiles	Doug Rowe (Denver)	Philadelphia, PA	
2003	Riverside Rugby	22-21	Olympic Club Rugby	Luke Waikamakawa & Nelo Lui (co-MVPs)	Pittsburgh, PA	
2004	Riverside Rugby	38-19	Denver Barbarians		Park City, UT	
2005	Old Blue of New York	31-17	Old Mission Beach Athletic	Sean Horan	Pittsburgh, PA	
2006	Old Mission Beach Athletic	29-14	Old Blue of New York		Bellingham, WA	
2007	Chicago Lions	35-21	Old Mission Beach Athletic	Austin Britts	Bellingham, WA	
2008	Gentlemen of Aspen	26-24	Belmont Shore Rugby	Mike Palefau	San Francisco, CA	
2009	Belmont Shore Rugby	34-15	Gentlemen of Aspen	Peter Sio	San Francisco, CA	
2010	Seattle-OPSB Rugby	26-17	Belmont Shore Rugby	Filimoni Botitu	San Francisco, CA	
2011	Belmont Shore Rugby	37-14	Schuylkill River Exiles	Shalom Suniula	San Francisco, CA	
2012	Belmont Shore Rugby	26-12	Chicago Lions	Mike Te'o	San Francisco, CA	
2013	Seattle-OPSB Rugby	26-5	Denver Barbarians	Miles Craigwell	Pittsburgh, PA	
2014	Seattle-OPSB Rugby	29-26	Old Blue of New York	Mike Palefau	Seattle, WA	
2015	Seattle Saracens	31-10	Denver Barbarians	Ata Malifa (Denver)	Des Moines, IA	
2016	Rugby Utah Selects	48-12	Kansas City Blues	Don Pati	Denver, CO	
2017	Rugby Utah Selects	22-21	Denver Barbarians	Don Pati	Minneapolis, MN	
2018	Bulldog Rugby	19-7	Belmont Shore Rugby	Michael Nelson		
2019	Washington Athletic	24-7	Life West Gladiators	Peter Tiberio	Kansas City, MO	
2020	Not held due to COVID-19					
2021	Chicago Lions	17-10	Westside Ronins	Will Chevalier		
2022	National Athletic Village	19-0	Old Blue of New York	Corey Jones		
2023	National Athletic Village	12-10	St. Louis Bombers	Simi Moala		
2024	National Athletic Village	26-12	Belmont Shore Rugby	Dalton Musselman		
2025	Northern Virginia Rugby	15-14	Chicago Lions	Owen Sheehy	Madison, WI	
2026	Old Blue of New York	17-12	Northern Virginia Rugby	Shadreck Mandaza	Madison, WI	

== Results — Women ==
Year	Champion	Score	Runner up	Tournament MVP	Location	Ref
2011	Berkeley All Blues	36-0	Boston Belles	Kelly Griffin	San Francisco, CA	
2012	San Diego Surfers	33-12	Seattle Breakers	Emilie Bydwell	San Francisco, CA	
2013	Berkeley All Blues	22-5	Northern Virginia Rugby	Irene Gardner	Pittsburgh, PA	
2014	San Diego Surfers	45-0	Old Blue of New York	Nia Williams	Seattle, WA	
2015	American Rugby Pro Training Center	21-17	Seattle Saracens	Jess Wooden	Des Moines, IA	
2016	Scion Sirens	38-0	Old Blue of New York	Kiki Morgan	Denver, CO	
2017	Seattle Atavus	26-14	San Diego Surfers	Megan Sanders	Minneapolis, MN	
2018	San Diego Surfers	19-12	Scion Sirens	Stephanie Rovetti	New York, NY	
2019	San Diego Surfers	21-12	Berkeley All Blues	Teigan MacDonald	Kansas City, KS	
2020	Not held due to COVID-19					
2021	Scion Rugby	40-0	Life West Gladiatrix	Jade McGrath	Tukwila, WA	
2022	Scion Rugby	29-7	WAC	Monique Coffey	St. Louis, MO	
2023	Chicago Lions	17-12	Camp Pendleton	Ashley Cowdrey	Madison, WI	
2024	Scion Rugby	17-5	Chicago Lions	Autumn LoCiero	Madison, WI	
2025	Chicago Lions	17-15	Chicago North Shore	Sereana Vulaono	Madison, WI	
2026	Scion Rugby	31-19	Chicago Lions	Camille Tong	Madison, WI	

== Performance by club ==
=== Men ===
Updated to include results for 2026:

Club	Winners	Winning years
Seattle Saracens (includes Seattle-OPSB and OPSB*)	8	1988, 1990, 1991, 1992, 2010, 2013, 2014, 2015
Old Mission Beach Athletic	6	1985, 1995, 2000, 2001, 2002
National Athletic Village	3	2022, 2023, 2024
Belmont Shore Rugby	3	2009, 2011, 2012
Old Blue of New York	3	1993, 2005, 2026
Riverside Rugby	2	2003, 2004
Rugby Utah Selects	2	2016, 2017
San Mateo Rugby	2	1997, 1998
Chicago Lions	2	2007, 2021
Northern Virginia Rugby	2	1996, 2025
Bulldog Rugby	1	2018
Duck Brothers Rugby	1	1987
Gentlemen of Aspen	1	2008
Maryland Old Boys	1	1989
Old Blues Rugby (CA)	1	1994
Philadelphia Whitemarsh Rugby	1	1999
Quad City Irish	1	1986
Washington Athletic	1	2019

- USA Rugby officially considers titles won by OPSB, Seattle-OPSB, and Seattle Saracens to be from the same club.

=== Women ===
Updated to include results for 2026:

Club	Winners	Winning years
Scion Sirens	5	2016, 2021, 2022, 2024, 2026
San Diego Surfers	4	2012, 2014, 2018, 2019
Berkeley All Blues	2	2011, 2013
Chicago Lions	2	2023, 2025
American Rugby Pro Training Center	1	2015
Seattle Atavus	1	2017

== Records ==
=== Men's Records 1985-2026 (*updated 2026) ===
- Most Cup Championships: 8, by the Seattle Saracens (history includes results as OPSB Rugby and Seattle-OPSB Rugby)
- Most Cup Finals: 9, by Old Mission Beach Athletic (6 gold, 3 silver)
- Highest Medal Count: 15, by the Denver Barbarians (0 gold, 8 silver, 7 bronze)
- Most Cup Semi-Finals: 20, by the Denver Barbarians
- Most Cup Quarter-Finals: 27, by the Denver Barbarians
- Best Winning Percentage (Minimum 30 games played): 80%, by the National Athletic Village
- Most Matches Won: 110, by the Denver Barbarians
- Most Appearances: 30, by the Denver Barbarians
- Most Consecutive Appearances: 18, by Belmont Shore (2007-2025)

=== Women's Records 2011-2026 (*updated 2026) ===
- Most Cup Championships: 5, by the Scion Sirens
- Most Cup Finals: 6, by the Scion Sirens
- Highest Medal Count: 8, by the San Diego Surfers (4 gold, 1 silver, 3 bronze)
- Most Cup Semi-Finals: 8, by the San Diego Surfers
- Most Cup Quarter-Finals: 12, by the San Diego Surfers
- Most Matches Won: 61, by the San Diego Surfers
- Most Appearances: 13, by Northern Virginia
- Most Consecutive Appearances: 13, by Northern Virginia (2011-2024)

=== Event Records ===
- Highest Attendance: 6,000 (2014 Club 7s)
- Largest margin of victory in a Cup Final: 54, by Old Mission Beach Athletic (54-0; 2002 Men's Club 7s) and 40, by Scion Sirens (40-0; 2021 Women's Club 7s)

== See Also ==
- 1979 National Sevens Rugby Tournament
- 1980 National Sevens Rugby Tournament
- 1981 National Sevens Rugby Tournament
- 1982 National Sevens Rugby Tournament
- 1983 National Sevens Rugby Tournament
- 1984 National Sevens Rugby Tournament
