= 1981 National Collegiate Rugby Championship =

Tournament details
- Tournament format(s): Knockout
- Date: May 9 – 10, 1981

Tournament statistics
- Teams: 4
- Matches played: 4

Final
- Venue: Dayton, OH
- Champions: California (2nd title)
- Runners-up: Harvard

The 1981 National Collegiate Rugby Championship was the second edition of the official national championship for intercollegiate rugby organized by the U.S. Rugby Football Union. The tournament was hosted by the Dayton-Miami Rugby Football Club at Wright-Patterson Air Force Base in Dayton, Ohio. The Cal Bears repeated as champions as did Mick Luckhurst as MVP. Brian Vincent, also of California, won Most Valuable Back.

== Venue ==
Ohio
Wright-Patterson	1981 National Collegiate Rugby Championship is located in Ohio
Dayton, Ohio	1981 National Collegiate Rugby Championship is located in Ohio
Capacity:	1981 National Collegiate Rugby Championship is located in Ohio

== Participants ==
Harvard
Qualified for the National Championship by winning the 16 team Eastern College Championship hosted by Virginia Tech at Blacksburg, VA on April 11–12.

- First round
  Harvard 16-3 Cornell
- Second round
  Harvard 12-11 Princeton
- Semifinal
  Harvard 11-7 Navy
- Final
  Harvard 26-12 Army

Roster:
President- Ray Roberts
Captains- John Morgan/Al Halliday
Record 15-0
Charles Bott (Center), Greg Carey (Flanker), Mark Cooley (Center), Keith Cooper (Prop), John Dorgan (Fullback), Jacques Driscoll (Center), Timothy Endicott (Scrumhalf), Al Halliday (Lock), Rich Iorio (Flanker), Rick Kief (Hooker), Bill Looney (Flanker), Malcolm Mackenzie (Wing), David Miller (Wing), Ed Montgomery (#8), Jerry Nelson (Flanker), Keith Oberg (Scrumhalf), Jim Phils (Prop), Steve Rintoul (Hooker), Roy Roberts (Prop), Steven Rosston (Wing), David Suave (Lock), Ed Tompkins (Center), Sabin Willett (Flyhalf).

Miami
Qualified for the National Championship by winning the 16 team Midwestern Collegiate Cup in Bowling Green, Ohio on May 2–3.

- Miami 10-4 Illinois
- Miami 13–9 Xavier
- Miami def. Rippon
- Miami 20–18 Stevens Point

Roster:
President- Terry Jones
Coach– Doug Edwards
Captain- John Kacmarsky
David Anzo (#8), Daniel Burtis (Prop), Matt Davis (Scrumhalf), Doug Edwards (Hooker), Leslie Irvine (Fullback), Terrance Jones (Lock), Eric Juday (Wing), John Kacmarsky (Center), Paul Koch (Scrumhalf), Richard Kroko (Lock), John Lucas (Flanker), Kent Lindsey (Lock), Thomas Link (Flyhalf), Joseph Martello (Flanker), Michael McCourt (Wing), Matt Meany (Flanker), Mitchell Mink (Fullback), Robert Morgan (Prop), Gary Pratt (Prop), Marty Trinkino (Hooker), Dale Tuttle (Center), Justin Whelan (Wing).

Kansas State
Qualified for the National Championship by winning the Western Regional in Denver, CO on April 25-26.

- Kansas State 9-4 Principia Kansas City
- Kansas State 26-3 Oklahoma
- Kansas State 13-11 New Mexico State

Roster:
President- Scott Bertrand
Coach- Greg Young, Charlie Busch
Captain- Scott Skahan
Rick Aeschliman (Wing), Scott Bertrand (Flyhalf), Daniel Blea (Fullback), Tim Brown (Flanker), Greg Hansen (Center), Don Harris (#8), Jim Hewitt (Lock), Dane Jacobson (Lock), Dean Colic (Lock), Pete Lewis (Wing), Tim McNamara (Center), Mike Nash (Center), Dwight Schaefer (Center), Bill Sexton (Prop), Scott Skahan (Hooker), Mark Snyder (Flanker), Mike Somodi (Fullback), Doak Stitt (Prop), Tim Walker (Lock), Dennis Wilbert (Scrumhalf).

California
Qualified from Pacific Regional at UCSB on April 10–11.

- California 17-9 Long Beach State
- California 12-11 BYU

Roster:
Coach- Ned Anderson
Trainer– Dave Stegner
Captain- Tim O'Brien
Drew Brooks (Prop), Jim Brown (Prop/Hooker), Dave Clark (Lock), Jessie Coueruvias (Lock), Mark Deaton (#8), Scott Denardo (Prop), Kris Donaldson (Wing), Frank Helm (Hooker), Don Hooper (Center), Don James (Prop), Ed Kerwin (Center), Mick Luckhurst (Fullback), Jeff McDermott (Flanker), Ken Meyersieck (Scrumhalf), Tim O'Brien (Center), Matt Secor (Fullback), Bruce Sorenson (Lock), Dennis Squeri (#8), Bob Tanaka (Scrumhalf), Matt Taylor (Wing), Brian Vincent (Flanker), Bob Williams (Flyhalf).

== Bracket ==
Regional Semifinal
April 10 - Santa Barbara, CA
California	17
Long Beach	9
April 10 - Santa Barbara, CA
BYU	16
Santa Barbara	12
April 26 - Denver, CO
Kansas State	23
Oklahoma	3
April 26 - Denver, CO
New Mexico State	3
Texas A&M	0
April 12 - Blacksburg, VA
Harvard	11
Navy	7
April 12 - Blacksburg, VA
Army	22
Maryland	10
May 3 - Bowling Green, OH
Miami (OH)	27
Ripon	9
May 3 - Bowling Green, OH
Stevens Point	7
Ohio State	3

Regional Final
April 11 - Santa Barbara, CA
California	12
BYU	11
April 26 - Denver, CO
Kansas State	13
New Mexico State	11
April 12 - Blacksburg, VA
Harvard	26
Army	12
May 3 - Bowling Green, OH
Miami	20
Stevens Point	18

National Semifinal
May 9 – Dayton, OH
California (Pacific)	29
Kansas State (West)	15
May 9 – Dayton, OH
Harvard (East)	25
Miami (Midwest)	7

National Final
May 10 – Dayton, OH
California	6
Harvard	3
Third place
May 10 – Dayton, OH
Miami	10
Kansas State	0

== Semifinals ==
9 May 1981
11:30 AM

California	29–15	Kansas State
Try: Mick Luckhurst 12'; Bob Williams c Ken Meyersieck 38' c Matt Taylor; Con: Mick Luckhurst (2/4); Pen: Mick Luckhurst; Mick Luckhurst 45'; Drop: Mike Lemmon 80'		Try: Pete Lewis 50' c Don Harris 55' c Con: Scott Bertrand (2/2); Pen: Scott Bertrand

Dayton, OH
Referee: Ian Nixon

9 May 1981

Harvard	25–7	Miami
Try: Charlie Bott c Charlie Bott c Kip Mackenzie c Bill Looney 60'; Con: Charlie Bott (3/4); Pen: Charlie Bott		Try: John Kacmersky; Pen: John Kacmersky

Dayton, OH

== Third place ==
10 May 1981

Miami	10–0	Kansas State
Try: John Kacmarsky c Justin Whelan; Con: John Kacmarsky; Pen: ?

Dayton, OH
Attendance: 6000

== Final ==
10 May 1981

California	6–3 OT	Harvard
Pen: Mick Luckhurst 5', 90'		Pen: Charlie Bott 50'

Dayton, OH
Attendance: 6000
Referee: Don Reardon (SoCal)

== See also ==
1981 National Rugby Championships
