= Riverside Rugby Club =

(United States) Riverside Rugby RFC
- Full name: Riverside Rugby Football Club
- Union: USA Rugby
- Nickname: Riverside
- Founded: 1969; 57 years ago
- Ground: Reid Park
- President: Alvaro Valenzuela, Head Coach
- League: SCRFU
1st kit	2nd kit

Official website
- www.riversiderugby.com

Riverside Rugby Club competes in the Southern California Rugby Football Union. Riverside's style of play has been described as "Southern Hemisphere" Rugby. This style, popularized by New Zealand, Tonga and Fiji, emphasizes back-play over forward play, and focuses on quick ball movement and a high work rate. Riverside R.C. is best known for winning back-to-back titles at the 2003 and 2004 USA Rugby Club Sevens National Championship.

== Teams ==
- Men's A team- Killer Bees
- Men's 7s A team-Killer Bees

== Team Accomplishments ==
- 2008 SCRFU White Division Champion
- 2008 National Sweet 16 Qualifier 2nd Division
- 2004 USA 7’s Champion
- 2004 National Sweet 16 Qualifier 1st division
- 2004 SCRFU Red division Champion (perfect 12-0 1st division record)
- 2003 USA 7’s Champion
- 2003 USA 2nd Division champion
- 2003 SCRFU White division Champion
- 2000 National Sweet 16 Qualifier 2nd division

== Capped Players ==
The following current and former Riverside players have played for a national team.

- Malakai Delai (USA)
- Tui Osborne (USA)
- Nelo Lui (USA)

== Criticisms ==
Riverside has been a very inconsistent team. The club did not win in 2002. Two years later, Riverside was undefeated in 2004 in the highest SCRFU division. In 2006, the club again had the worst record in SCRFU, and was relegated. In 2008, the club won the white division and made the play-offs.

=== Player development ===
There are many factors that can cause such inconsistent performance. One argument is that too much of Riverside's talent is concentrated in a few players. Over the years, Riverside has demonstrated an ability to recruit top-tier Fijian-American, Tongan-American and Samoan-American players. Some have argued that the club has not done enough to develop local talent, which makes it very dependent on these key players.

=== Club status ===
Another challenge for Riverside is that the club may be under-capitalized for the level of performance expected by Riverside fans. Southern California teams, such as OMBAC and Belmont Shores, are capitalized organizations that provide training facilities and resources for rugby players in the United States.

== Sponsorship ==
Unlike the Super League, SCRFU does not have a national sponsor that shares operating costs with the teams. Riverside is supported by a combination of member dues and secondary sponsorships.
