= 1994 National Rugby Championships =

Tournament details
- Tournament format(s): Various
- Date: 1994

Tournament statistics

Final

The 1994 National Rugby Championships were a series of tournaments organized by the United States RFU to determine a national champion in several divisions for United States rugby teams. The divisions included club, college, high school, military, sevens, all–stars and local union.

== Men's Club ==
The 1994 USA Rugby National Club Championship took place at the Winnemac Stadium in Chicago, IL from May 14–15. The teams featured in the tournament were the champions of the four sub unions of USARFU. OMBAC of San Diego, CA won its fourth national title.

Regional Semifinal
April 23 - Phoenix, AZ
OMBAC	35
Old Puget Sound Beach	7
April 23 - Phoenix, AZ
Old Blues	32
Belmont Shore	9
April 30 - Dallas, TX
Kansas City Blues	55
St. Louis Ramblers	5
April 30 - Dallas, TX
Dallas Harlequins	23
GOATS	6
December 4 - Columbia, SC
Life College	21
Potomac AC	15
December 4 - Columbia, SC
Old Blue	18
Hilton Head	0
April 24 - Indianapolis, IN
Milwaukee	35
Scioto Valley	0
April 24 - Indianapolis, IN
Chicago Lions	30
Cincinnati Wolfhounds	14

Regional Final
April 24 - Phoenix, AZ
OMBAC	23
Old Blues	6
May 1 - Dallas, TX
Kansas City Blues	12
Dallas Harlequins	8
December 5 - Columbia, SC
Life College	24
Old Blue	16
April 24 - Indianapolis, IN
Milwaukee	28
Chicago Lions	20

National Semifinal
May 14 - Washington, DC
OMBAC	28
Kansas City Blues	7
May 14 - Washington, DC
Life College	29
Milwaukee	19

National Final
May 15 - Washington, DC
OMBAC	30
Life College	13
Third place
May 15 - Washington, DC
Kansas City Blues	57
Milwaukee	29

=== Semifinals ===
14 May 1994
3:00PM

Life College	29–19	Milwaukee
Try: Britt Howard 25' c Steve Gootkind 31' c Tony Brooks 70'; Bradley Nelson 74' c Con: John Fenn (2); Mike Caulder (1); Pen: John Fenn 58'		Try: Steve Jung (2); Pen: Simon Bailey 7', 43', 49'

Chicago, IL
Referee: Don Reordan (USARFU)

14 May 1994
5:00PM

OMBAC	28–7	Kansas City Blues
Try: Kelly Dolan 47' c Con: Jason McVeigh; Pen: Jason McVeigh 1', 9', 19', 39', 60', 2H', 2H'		Try: Matt Tanner 80'

Chicago, IL
Referee: Mark Binning (USARFU)

=== Third place ===
15 May 1994
1:00PM

Kansas City Blues	57–29	Milwaukee
Try: Frank Kennedy; Brad Hughes; Scott Kram; Carl Tripp; Jeff Bodinson (3); Andy Buchanan (2); Paul Tripp; Con: (2); Pen: Schaun Colin		Try: Jeff Anderson; Steve Jung; Jeff Campbell; Dan Marz; Jeff Anderson; Con: (2)

Chicago, IL
Referee: Don Reordan (USARFU)

=== Final ===
15 May 1994
11:00AM

OMBAC	30–16	Life College
Try: Rick Crivellone 2'; Chris Lippert 8' c Joe Santos; Joe Santos 74' c Con: Jason McVeigh; Pen: Jason McVeigh 24', 60'		Try: Greg Schor 46'; Dennis Peyroux 76'; Pen: John Fenn 39'; Mike Caulder

Chicago, IL
Referee: Mark Binning (USARFU)

Champions: Old Mission Beach Athletic Club
Staff: Bing Dawson (Coach), Graham Downes (Assistant), Mick Rolls (Manager)
Roster: Robert Affleck (Center), Sean Allen (Hooker), Gabriel Arauje (Prop), Scott Bracken (Prop), John Carniroli (Halfback), Kevin Casey (Flanker), Dave Crist (Center), Rick Crivellone (Lock), Kelly Dolan (Lock), Jerry Fanning (Hooker), Dennis Gonzalez (Flanker), Matt Heasley (Center), John Hinkin (Wing), Ben Hough (Flanker), Solo Komai (Flanker), Jon Lee (Wing), Bill Leversee (Lock), Chris Lippert (Prop), Duncan Lumsden (Fullback), Simon Matthews (Flyhalf/Fullback), Jason McVeigh (Flyhalf), Kevin Perry (Prop), Joe Santos (Wing), Tom Short (Center), Brian Vizard (#8), Brad Walker (Lock), Frank Zugovitz (Lock).

== Club Division II ==
The 1994 National Division II Championship was the third edition of this tournament held May 7–8 at Zilker Park in Austin, TX. The Santa Rosa club of California was the champion.
Tournament MVP was Santa Rosa flanker Dan McMillon.

Regional Semifinal
April 23 - Santa Rosa, CA
Santa Rosa	65
Skyline	0
April 23 - Santa Rosa, CA
San Fernando Valley	W
Eugene	L
December 4 - Columbia, SC
Baton Rouge	19
Severn River	12
December 4 - Columbia, SC
Burlington	W
Augusta	L
April 23 - Chicago, IL
Lincoln Park	28
Wisconsin	8
April 23 - Chicago, IL
Dayton	6*
South Side Irish	6
April 30 - Dallas, TX
Denton	30
Kohlfeld Scorpions	10
April 30 - Dallas, TX
Topeka	19
San Antonio	10

Regional Final
April 24 - Santa Rosa, CA
Santa Rosa	31
San Fernando Valley	8
December 5 - Columbia, SC
Baton Rouge	7
Burlington	3
April 24 - Chicago, IL
Lincoln Park	30
Dayton	11
May 1 - Dallas, TX
Denton	24
Topeka	19

National Semifinal
May 7 - Austin, TX
Santa Rosa	32
Baton Rouge	12
May 7 - Austin, TX
Lincoln Park	16
Denton	7

National Final
May 8 - Austin, TX
Santa Rosa	27
Lincoln Park	3
Third place
May 8 - Austin, TX
Baton Rouge	38
Denton	13

* Advanced on kicks

Semifinals

7 May 1994
12:00PM

Lincoln Park	16–7	Denton
Try: Jon Stanicek c Con: Mark Mey; Pen: Mark Mey (3)		Try: Jim Loggins c Con: Phillip Gravelle

Austin, TX
Referee: Bob Hamilton (Little Rock)

7 May 1994
2:00PM

Santa Rosa	32–12	Baton Rouge
Try: Brendan Winslow; Dan McMillon; Jeff Dunbar c Con: Bill Barnett; Pen: Bill Barnett 5		Try: Kirby White; Quinn Clark c Con: Malcolm Delahoussaye

Austin, TX

Third place

8 May 1994
11:00AM

Baton Rouge	38–13	Denton
Try: Martin Marchiafava 6'; Dave Voltz c Martin Marchiafava c Andy Roach c Thurman Johnson; Kevin Bentivegna c Con: Malcolm Delahoussaye		Try: George Garza; Dave Floyd; Pen: Phillip Gravelle

Austin, TX

Final

8 May 1994
1:00PM

Santa Rosa	27–3	Lincoln Park
Try: Matt Eshoo 20' c penalty try c John Tomasin c Con: Bill Barnett; Pen: Bill Barnett (2)		Pen: Mark Mey

Austin, TX
Referee: Mike Geech (Dallas)

Champions: Santa Rosa
Coach: Pete Eiermann
Captain: John Welsh
Roster: Kahaulelio, Chambers, Bodwin, Doug Orr, Matt Eshoo, John Tomasin, Boylan, Pickford, McKamey, Chris Orr, Gilligan, Dan McMillon, Bill Barnett, Brendan Winslow, Jeff Dunbar.

== Women's Club ==
The 1994 Women's National Rugby Championship was an eight team tournament and played at UMass in Amherst, MA on May 28–29. The Berkeley All Blues defeated the Bay Area Shehawks for the title.

Plate Division

- Minnesota W–L Colorado Old Girls (Semifinal)
- Boston W–L UCLA (Semifinal)
- UCLA W–L Colorado Old Girls (Third place)
- Boston W–L Minnesota (Championship)

Quarterfinals

28 May 1994

Berkeley All Blues	32–17	Beantown
Try: 1H'; 1H' c Jen Crawford; 2H'; Con: 1 Pen: 2		Try: 3 Con: 1

Amherst, MA

28 May 1994

Bay Area Shehawks	27–5	Florida State

Amherst, MA

28 May 1994

Twin City Amazons	W–L	Black Ice

Amherst, MA

28 May 1994

Chicago	W–L	Mizzou

Amherst, MA

Consolation semifinals

28 May 1994

Beantown	70–6	Black Ice

Amherst, MA

28 May 1994

Florida State	76–0	Mizzou

Amherst, MA

Seventh place

29 May 1994

Black Ice	W–L	Mizzou

Amherst, MA

Fifth place

29 May 1994

Beantown	39–5	Florida State
		Try: Patty Jervey

Amherst, MA

Semifinals

28 May 1994

Berkeley All Blues	W–L	Twin City Amazons
Pen: 1		Pen: 1

Amherst, MA

28 May 1994

Bay Area SheHawks	W–L	Chicago

Amherst, MA

Third place

29 May 1994

Twin City Amazons	W–L	Chicago

Amherst, MA

Final

29 May 1994

Berkeley All Blues	19–14	Bay Area Shehawks

Amherst, MA

Lineups:
Bay Area SheHawks– Kathy Morrison (Coach), Weix, Pepper, Schawver, Surr, Cook, Meredith, Law, Murray, Kelly, Bergmann, Zdarko, Misko, Mauldin, Gutierrez, Keith (Cote).
Beantown– Flavin, Palmacci, Hertz, Stevens, Rutkowski, Spicer–Bourdon, Kilander, Williams, Connell, Dixey, Sullivan, Craven, Morrissey, Newton, Westerman.

== College ==
The 1994 College championship was won by UC Berkeley with a win over Navy. Air Force won the fourth edition of the Women's Collegiate Championship. The College All–Star Championship was won by the Pacific Coast while the East was runner–up.

== Military ==
The 1994 National Military Rugby Championship were hosted by the Columbus/Fort Benning Cruise–a–matics rugby club and took place at Stewart Field in Fort Benning, GA from April 23–24. There were 30 teams that participated in the event. The club division was won by NAS Pensacola with a win over Fort Bragg. Pensacola scrumhalf Mark Pidcock and Fort Benning lock E.J. Hall were the MVPs. Cherry Point beat Panama 45–10 to win the consolation bracket. Cherry Point I won the 7s tournament 10–7 over Cherry Point II. In the Open division the President's XV won the title 32–0 over USUHS.

Consolation bracket

Quarter-finals
April 23 – Fort Benning, GA
Cherry Point	26
29 Palms	0
April 23 – Fort Benning, GA
Fort Hood	22
Fort Rucker	6
April 23 – Fort Benning, GA
Panama	31
Parris Island	0
April 23 – Fort Benning, GA
Scott AFB	22
Fort Bliss	3

Semi-finals
April 23 – Fort Benning, GA
Cherry Point	18*
Fort Hood	18
April 23 – Fort Benning, GA
Panama	7*
Scott AFB	10

Final
April 24 – Fort Benning, GA
Cherry Point	46
Panama	10
Third place
April 24 – Fort Benning, GA
West Point
Camp Pendleton

* Cherry Point advanced on kicks after overtime
* Panama advanced due to Scott having ineligible player

Championship bracket

Quarter-finals
April 23 – Fort Benning, GA
Pensacola NAS	26
Eglin	0
April 23 – Fort Benning, GA
West Point	39
Fort Benning	0
April 23 – Fort Benning, GA
Fort Bragg	12
USUHS	6
April 23 – Fort Benning, GA
Camp Pendleton	10
Monterey	0

Semi-finals
April 24 – Fort Benning, GA
Pensacola NAS	16
West Point	9
April 24 – Fort Benning, GA
Fort Bragg	7
Camp Pendleton	6

Final
April 24 – Fort Benning, GA
Pensacola NAS	32
Fort Bragg	5
Third place
April 24 – Fort Benning, GA
West Point
Camp Pendleton

Club Championship

24 April 1994

Pensacola	34–7	Fort Bragg
Try: Randall c Houlahan c Michalis c Linder c Con: Keith Takabayashi (4); Pen: Keith Takabayashi (2)		Try: Schuster c

Fort Benning, GA
Attendance: 300
Referee: Mark Binning (PRFU

Lineups:
Pensacola– Randall, Salene, Speece, Bensch (Nolan), Frey, Fleming, Edgarton, Elsie, Takabayashi, Ellis, Houlahan, Euler, Linder, Garton, Michales.
Fort Bragg– Thompson (Captain), Swiatek, Wos, May, Hall, Troutman, Williams, Malinowski, Boone, Schuster, Byrnes, Goldhammer, Germain, Dodson, Irwine.

The 1994 Interservice Rugby Championship was held at the Pensacola Naval Air Station in Florida from 8 to 10 September. The teams involved were select sides of each service branch. From these teams a selection was made to field the Combined Services Rugby team for tours. Navy was the championship for the first time.

Results:

Round Robin					Scores				
Rank	Standings	Pld	W	L	ARM	MAR	NAV	AIR	COA
1.	Army	4	3	1	X	10:18	26:3	30:0	21:5
2.	Marines	4	3	1	18:10	X	0:8	27:16	27:3
3.	Navy	4	3	1	3:26	8:0	X	10:0	23:0
4.	Air Force	4	1	3	0:30	16:27	0:10	X	16:0
5.	Coast Guard	4	0	4	5:21	3:27	0:23	0:16	X

Wooden Spoon
Coast Guard

Third place

10 September 1994
8:00AM

Navy	17–0	Air Force
Try: Mark Pidcock; Rob Linder; Jamie Coon; Con: Dave Edgarton

Pensacola, FL

Championship

10 September 1994
10:00AM

Army	25–17	Marines
Try: Mike Bowman; Mike Legg; Craig Haines; Mark Pidcock; Mike Legg c Con: Bill Marshall; Pen: Bill Marshall 58', 65'		Try: Rodney Washington; Phil Murphy; Ellis Graves 68' c Con: Keith Takabayashi

Pensacola, FL

== Sevens ==
Club
The 1994 National Club Sevens championship, was played at Palo Alto High School football stadium in Palo Alto, CA from 20 to 21 August. There were eight teams featured which included two representatives from each of the four territorial unions. Milwaukee and Michigan Wolverines qualified from the Midwest. Northern Virginia and Maryland Exiles qualified from the East. Old Blues and Los Angeles represented the Pacific Coast. Aspen and Kansas City Blues represented the West. Old Blues defeated the Exiles to win the championship. Steve Hiatt of Old Blues was the MVP.

Pool 1
First round

- NOVA 14–12 Los Angeles
- Milwaukee 24–12 KC Blues

Second round

- NOVA 14–7 KC Blues
- Milwaukee 22–7 Los Angeles

Third round

- NOVA 21–7 Milwaukee
- KC Blues 28–21 Los Angeles

Pool 2
First round

- Old Blues 24–21 Maryland Exiles
- Michigan 21–15 Aspen

Second round

- Michigan 21–12 Old Blues
- Maryland Exiles 33–7 Aspen

Third round

- Old Blues 47–7 Aspen
- Maryland Exiles 52–14 Michigan

Plate Semifinals
Kansas City Blues 35-0 Aspen
Los Angeles 17-7 Michigan

Plate Final
Los Angeles 14-7 Kansas City Blues

Championship Semifinals

21 August 1994

Old Blues	17–14	Northern Virginia
Try: Gary Hein 6' c Steve Hiatt 10' c Con: Andre Bachelet; Pen: Andre Bachelet		Try: Chris Andres c Prince Hill c Con: Chris Andres

Palo Alto, CA
Referee: B. Carter

21 August 1994

Maryland Exiles	15–12	Milwaukee
Try: Keith Gittings; Keith Gittings 13'; Brian Gallagher		Try: Simon Bailey c Rich Matiszik; Con: Simon Bailey

Palo Alto, CA

Championship Final

21 August 1994

Old Blues	31–0	Maryland Exiles
Try: Rich Dahlquist 3'; Andre Bachelet 5' c Shepherd c Tom Healy; Steve Hiatt c Con: Hiatt

Palo Alto, CA
Referee: Josh Tameifuna

Champions: Old Blues (Berkeley)
Coach: Ramon Samaniego
Captain: Scott Shepherd
Roster: Rich Dahlquist, Chris Motes, Andre Bachelet, Steve Hiatt, D. Pearson, Tom Healy, Wayne Chai, Gary Hein, Rob Lumkong.

All Star
The 1994 National All-Star Sevens rugby tournament was an eight team tournament with two representatives from each territory. The other purpose of the tournament was to select members for the U.S. Eagles Seven–a–side team. This year's tournament took place at Palo Alto High School football stadium in Palo Alto, CA from 20 to 21 August. The East I team won the final 45–7 over the East II team.

Pool 1
First round

- Pacific I 26–14 Midwest II
- East II 24–14 West I

Second round

- Pacific I 28–7 East II
- West I 28–14 Midwest II

Third round

- West I 29–7 Pacific I
- East II 45–0 Midwest II

Pool 2
First round

- Midwest I 26–7 West II
- East I 35–5 Pacific II

Second round

- Midwest I 24–5 Pacific II
- East I 40–0 West II

Third round

- East I 26–12 Midwest I
- Pacific II 40–7 West II

Plate Semifinals
Pacific I 26-7 West II
Pacific II 21-15 Midwest II

Plate Final
Pacific I 31-21 Pacific II

Semifinals

21 August 1994

East II	19–14	Midwest I
Try: George Miller 4'; Drew Fautley 13' c Brian Geraghty 20' c Con: Al Dekin; Brian Collins		Try: Kevin Terpstra c Frank Black 17' c Con: Harry McDonald

Palo Alto, CA
Referee: B. Carter

21 August 1994

East I	17–12	West I
Try: Brian Dettling 4'; Marty O'Connor 5' c Vinnie Brunetti 13'; Con: Marty O'Connor		Try: Mike Twaddell 16'; Steve Duck 17' c Con: Mike Twaddell

Palo Alto, CA

Final

21 August 1994

East I	45–7	East II
Try: Paul Meyers 4' c Jeff Damron; Paul Myers c Marty O'Connor c Chris Carney; Jon Campbell; Al Dekin; Con: Marty O'Connor (3); Al Dekin (2)		Try: Marcus Maffei c Con: Bill Russell

Palo Alto, CA

== All–Star ==
In 1994 The National All–Star Championship featured four teams and took place at Long Beach State University in Long Beach, CA from May 28–30. This edition included the four regional rugby union teams as a mean of selecting the USA Eagles.

Results:

28 May 1994
10:00AM

West	–	Midwest

Long Beach, CA

28 May 1994
12:00PM

Pacific Coast	–	East

Long Beach, CA

29 May 1994
1:00PM

West	–	East

Long Beach, CA

29 May 1994
3:00PM

Pacific Coast	–	Midwest

Long Beach, CA

30 May 1994
10:00AM

East	–	Midwest

Long Beach, CA

30 May 1994
2:00PM

Pacific Coast	–	West

Long Beach, CA

Women's All–Star
The eighth edition of the Women's All–Star was hosted by Stanford University and played at Maloney Stadium from December 4–5 in Palo Alto, CA. The Eastern RU came in first.

4 December 1993
9:00AM

Midwest	29–5	West

Palo Alto, CA

4 December 1993
11:00AM

Pacific Coast	13–17	East
		Try: Patty Jervee; Brett Newton; Alex Williams

Palo Alto, CA

5 December 1993
8:00 AM

West	5–19	Pacific Coast

Palo Alto, CA

5 December 1993
9:30AM

East	49–3	Midwest

Palo Alto, CA

5 December 1993
12:00PM

West	5–51	East

Palo Alto, CA

5 December 1993
1:30PM

Pacific Coast	–	Midwest

Palo Alto, CA

== Local Union ==
The 1994 National Local Union Championship took place in Lemont, IL from June 18–19. This tournament brought together the Local Union champions of the four regional territories. Potomac represented the East, Chicago Area represented the Midwest RFU, Texas represented the Western RFU, and the Pacific Coast RFU representative, Northern California had to withdraw and was replaced by Metropolitan New York. Potomac were the champions. Met NY fullback Dan Kennedy was Most Valuable Back and Met NY #8 Adrian Scott was Most Valuable Forward.

Semifinals

18 June 1994

Met New York	39–8	Texas
Try: Mike Tolkin; Dare Studevant 30' c Chris Davis 53' c Adrian Scott 64' c Paul Holdstock 70' c Chris Davis 73'; Con: Billy O'Connell; Pen: Billy O'Connell 22'		Try: Mike Mazzerolle 48'; Pen: Brendan Conlin 10'

Lemont, IL
Referee: Paul Jepson (Ohio)

18 June 1994

Potomac	35–0	Chicago Area
Try: Lance French 42'; Mike Farling 48' c Prince Hill 61' c, 70' c, 73'; Con: Wayne Howe; Pen: Steve Laake 3'; Chris Andres 30'

Lemont, IL
Referee: David Steele (Ontario)

Third place

19 June 1994

Chicago Area	24–16	Texas
Try: Phil Olson 35', 75'; Mark Santiago 42'; Pen: Phil Olson 16', 28', 51'		Try: Mike Mazzerolle 31' c Con: Dave Baumann; Pen: Dave Baumann 48', 53', 72'

Lemont, IL

Final

19 June 1994

Potomac	23–17	Met New York
Try: Lance French 5'; Chris Andres 28' c Chris Schrichte; Con: Wayne Howe; Pen: Wayne Howe 16', 47'		Try: Jim Wailer 37' c Billy O'Connell 59' c Con: Chris Liles; Billy O'Connell; Pen: Chris Liles 19'

Lemont, IL
Referee: David Steele (Canada)

Lineups:
Met NY– Colin Kiley (Coach), Vilkelis, Casella, Galloway, Wilds, James, Doran, Basile, Scott, Walsh, Liles(O'Connell), Studevant, Davis, Walier, Holdstock, Kennedy.
Potomac– Clarence Culpepper (Coach), Trump, Yale, Parsons, Wood, Barry, Suida, Schrichte, Keith, Bowyer, Howe, Andres, Williams, French, Hill, Fabling.

== High School ==
The 1994 National High School Rugby Championship was a twelve team tournament that took place from 20 to 21 May at Ponderosa High School in Parker, CO. Highland from Utah won the championship by defeating Redmond of Seattle in the final.Reuben Harris was MVP Forward and Lihai Makoni was MVP Back.

Scores:
Group I
Highland Rams 19-5 Minneapolis Southwest 11am
Xavier vs Omaha Griffons noon
Fort Collins vs MN SW 1pm
Skyline vs Omaha Griffons 2pm
Highland Rams 34–3 Fort Collins 3pm
Xavier vs Skyline 4pm

Group II
Park Hill 11–8 Santa Rosa 11am
Morton Memorial vs West End noon
Walt Whitman 13–6 Santa Rosa 1pm
Redmond vs West End 2pm
Park Hill vs Walt Whitman 3pm
Morton Memorial vs Redmond 4pm

Semifinals

21 May 1994

Highland	33–0	Walt Whitman

Parker, CO

21 May 1994

Redmond	14–7	Xavier

Parker, CO

Third place

21 May 1994

Walt Whitman	–	Xavier

Parker, CO

=== Final ===
21 May 1994
5:00PM

Highland	61–6	Redmond

Parker, CO
