= 1983 National Rugby Championships =

Series of tournaments

Tournament details
- Tournament format(s): Various
- Date: 1983

Tournament statistics

Final

The 1983 National Rugby Championships were a series of tournaments organized to determine a national champion in several divisions for United States rugby teams. The divisions included Men's/Women's Club, college, high school, Military, Sevens, and Interterritorial.

== Men's Club ==
The 1983 National Club Rugby Championship was sponsored by Michelob and took place in Chicago, Illinois at Winnemac Park Stadium from May 14–15. The teams featured in the tournament were the champions of the four sub unions of USARFU. Boston RFC represented the Eastern Union after winning their regional final 34–9 over the Norfolk Blues. The Chicago Lions represented the Midwest Union by winning the Mid America Cup with a 30–15 win over Akron. The Dallas Harlequins earned the right to represent the Western RFU by defeating the St. Louis Falcons 35–4. The Old Blues defeated Old Puget Sound 20–6 to win the Pacific Coast Championship. The Berkeley Old Blues won the National title defeating Dallas Harlequins in the final 23–0.

Territorial Semifinal
April 30 - Conshohocken, PA
Boston	22
Northern Virginia	9
April 30 - Conshohocken, PA
Norfolk City Blues	16
Atlanta Renegades	12
April 10 -
St. Louis Falcons	20
Tulsa	12
April - Denver, CO
Denver Barbarians	18
Dallas Harlequins	27
April 24 - Indianapolis, IN
Chicago Lions	19
Detroit	3
April 24 - Indianapolis, IN
Milwaukee	13
Louisville	4
April 23 - Seattle, WA
Kent Valley	6
Old Puget Sound	24
April 23 - Seattle, WA
Old Blues	19
BATS	12

Territorial Final
May 1 - Conshohocken, PA
Boston	34
Norfolk City Blues	9
April 23 - St. Louis, MO
St. Louis Falcons	4
Dallas Harlequins	35
April 24 - Indianapolis, IN
Chicago Lions	19
Milwaukee	6
April 24 - Seattle, WA
Old Puget Sound	6
Old Blues	20

National Semifinal
May 14 – Chicago, IL
Boston	0
Dallas Harlequins	6
May 14 – Chicago, IL
Chicago Lions	0
Old Blues	7

National Final
May 15 – Chicago, IL
Old Blues	23
Dallas Harlequins	0
Third place
May 15 – Chicago, IL
Chicago Lions	7
Boston	3

=== Semifinals ===
14 May 1983

Dallas Harlequins	9–7	Boston
Try: Ricardo Chapar 19' c Con: Allen Spriggs; Pen: Allen Spriggs		Try: Bill Ream; Pen: Rory Mather

Chicago, IL
Referee: Alex Biddlecombe (Vancouver)

14 May 1983

Old Blues	7–0	Boston
Try: Roy Helu 72'; Pen: Bill Armstrong 33'

Chicago, IL
Referee: Nixon (USARFU)

=== Third place ===
15 May 1983

Chicago Lions	7–3	Boston
Try: Kevin Moylan 52'; Pen: Paul McNaughton		Drop: Mario Marsano 39'

Chicago, IL
Referee: Alex Biddlecombe (British Colombia)

=== Final ===
15 May 1983

Old Blues	23–0	Dallas Harlequins
Try: Mark Richter 19'; Mark Deaton 23' c Mark Deaton 45'; Whit Everett 71'; Con: Bill Armstrong; Pen: Bill Armstrong

Chicago, IL
Referee: Nixon (USARFU)

Champions: Old Blues RFC of Berkeley, CA
Coach: Jeff Hollings, Steve Ponder, Leo Fracess(Pres.)
Captain: Whit Everett (Flanker)
Roster: Bill Armstrong (Fullback), Rick Bailey (Prop), Mark Bass (Flanker), David Bateman (Scrumhalf), Drew Brooks (Hooker), Randy Coste (Prop), Duke Dapper (Lock), Mark Deaton (#8), John Everett (Hooker), Roy Helu (Center), Chuck Hextrum (Lock), Mark Hoffman (Lock), Dean Landry (Prop), Jeff Lucas (Prop), Tim Mascaroni (Fullback), Bo Meyersieck (Flyhalf), Ken Meyersieck (Scrumhalf), David Morrison (Flanker), Tim O'Brien (Center), Mark Richter (Wing), Mike Smith (Wing), Matt Taylor (Wing), Art Ward (Lock), Blane Warhurst (Flanker), Jeff Westcoff (Wing).

== Women's Club ==
The 1983 Women's National Rugby Championship was a tournament that took place on May 28–29 at the Ned Brown Forest Preserve in Schaumburg, IL. Beantown of Boston, MA won the championship with an 11–10 win over Florida State. Beantown advanced to the championship with wins over Chicago and Denver. Mary Ellen Moynihan of Beantown was MVP.

Quarter-finals
May 28 – Schaumburg, IL
Beantown	10
Chicago	9
May 28 – Schaumburg, IL
Denver Blues	W
Belmont Shore	L
May 28 – Schaumburg, IL
Florida State	32
Madison	6
May 28 – Schaumburg, IL
UCLA	W
Houston	L

Semi-finals
May 28 – Schaumburg, IL
Beantown	22
Denver Blues	0
May 28 – Schaumburg, IL
Florida State	13
UCLA	0

Final
May 29 – Schaumburg, IL
Beantown	11
Florida State	10
Third place
May 29 – Schaumburg, IL
Denver Blues
UCLA

=== Final ===
29 May 1983

Beantown	11–10	Florida State
Try: Jan Rutkowski; Jan Rutkowski 22'; Pen: Margie McClure 39'		Try: Candi Orsini 34' c Karen Cooper 50'; Con: Sharon Jamison (1/2)

Schaumburg, IL
Referee: Sherry Milner

Lineups:
Beantown– Moynihan, Money, Kimball, Girouard, Rubarth, Heffernan (Captain), Bridi, Rutkowski, Cepko, McClure, Keith, Moran, Morrissey, McVann, Malinowski.
Florida State– Kalman, Kossman, S. Hill, Kojm, C. Hill, Bonakar, Morton, Flores, Holmes (Captain), Jakubcin, Cooper, Rosen, Orsini, Bowlin, Jamison.

All Tournament Team
Props– Sheila Hill (Florida State), Mary Ellen Moynihan (Beantown)
Hooker– Linda Whitehead (Chicago)
Second Row– Donna Groman (UCLA), Kathy Kojm (Florida State)
#8– Kathy Flores (Florida State)
Flanker– Sharon Fields (Houston), Connie Bridi (Beantown)
Flyhalf– Polly Foureman (Madison)
Scrumhalf– Mary Holmes (Florida State)
Inside Center– Andrea McKenzie (UCLA)
Outside Center– Candi Orsini (Florida State)
Wings– Vicki Bowlin (Florida State), Micky McVann (Beantown)

== College ==
The 1983 College championship was won by University of California at Berkeley. Air Force was runner-up.

== Military ==
The 1983 U.S. Armed Forces Rugby Championship was an 18 team event that took place at Honor Field in Fort Polk, LA from May 6–8 and was won by Uniformed Services University Hospital Services with a 6–0 win over Fort Stewart. The Health Sciences School of Medicine team from Bethesda, MD made it to the championship with shutout wins against Fort Hood, Camp Pendleton, and Wright Patterson.
Championship Bracket

First round
May 7 – Ft. Polk, LA
USUHS	3
Fort Hood	0
May 7 – Ft. Polk, LA
Camp Pendleton	10
Ft. Polk B	0
May 7 – Ft. Polk, LA
Wright Pat Jets	4
Yuma	0
May 7 – Ft. Polk, LA
Davis Monthan	12
Fort Campbell	4
May 7 – Ft. Polk, LA
Fort Stewart	20
Ft. Polk A	7
May 7 – Ft. Polk, LA
Fort Sill	31
PACAF	0
May 7 – Ft. Polk, LA
29 Palms	34
Fort Benning	4
May 7 – Ft. Polk, LA
Scott AFB	20
Parris Island	3

Quarterfinal
May 8 – Ft. Polk, LA
USUHS	4
Camp Pendleton	0
May 8 – Ft. Polk, LA
Wright Pat Jets	10
Davis Monthan	4
May 8 – Ft. Polk, LA
Fort Stewart	16
Fort Sill	4
May 8 – Ft. Polk, LA
29 Palms	22
Scott AFB	3

Semifinal
May 8 – Ft. Polk, LA
USUHS	13
Wright Pat Jets	0
May 8 – Ft. Polk, LA
Fort Stewart	8
29 Palms	4

Final
May 8 – Ft. Polk, LA
USUHS	6
Fort Stewart	0

=== Final ===
8 May 1983

USUHS	6–0	Fort Stewart
Pen: Kenny Tashiro (2/2)

Fort Polk, LA
Referee: Cpt. Bill Nelson (USN)

Consolation Bracket

Quarter-finals
May 7 – Ft. Polk, LA
Fort Hood	36
Ft. Polk B	4
May 7 – Ft. Polk, LA
Yuma	7
Fort Campbell	3
May 7 – Ft. Polk, LA
Ft. Polk A	16
PACAF	0
May 7 – Ft. Polk, LA
Fort Benning	14
Parris Island	6

Semi-finals
May 8 – Ft. Polk, LA
Fort Hood	8
Yuma	10
May 8 – Ft. Polk, LA
Ft. Polk A	17
Fort Benning	10

Final
May 8 – Ft. Polk, LA
Ft. Polk A	17
Yuma	12

Additional games
May 7
Black Sheep 26–14 Coast Guard
May 8
Ft. Polk B 16–27 Fort Campbell // Parris Island 15–10 PACAF
Black Sheep 10–4 Davis Monthan // Coast Guard 4–7 Fort Sill
Camp Pendleton 10–0 Black Sheep // Scott AFB 16–0 Coast Guard

== Sevens ==
The 1983 National Sevens Rugby Tournament was a ten team tournament hosted by the Hartford Wanderers and took place on June 18, 1983, at Sterling Field in West Hartford, Connecticut. The University of Rhode Island Old Boys were the champions.
Path to championship:

- URI Old Boys 18–12 Charles River
- URI Old Boys 24–0 West Hartford Yahoo's
- URI Old Boys 16–0 Bethlehem
- URI Old Boys w/o N.Y.A.C.

Path to final:

- Duck Brothers 34–0 Beacon Hill
- Duck Brothers 24–0 Syracuse Harlequins
- Duck Brothers 22–12 Banshees
- Duck Brothers 18–4 Big Apple Aces

Final:

18 June 1983

URI Old Boys	28–6	Duck Brothers
Try: Bob Belluzzi c Pete Thorpe; Bobby Reed c Peter Thorpe c Frank Taglenti c Con: Bob Belluzzi		Try: 1 c

Hartford, CT

== ITT ==
The Inter Territorial Tournament involved the four regional rugby unions comprising the United States RFU: Pacific Coast RFU, Western RFU, Midwest RFU, and the Eastern Rugby Union. The region teams are formed with players selected from the sub regional rugby unions. Subsequently, the USA Eagles are selected from the four regional teams after the ITT concludes. The 1983 ITT took place in Oak Brook, IL from May 28–30. The Pacific Coast RFU repeated as tournament champions for the seventh time.
Results:

28 May 1983

Pacific Coast	17–12	Western
Try: Mike Schaub; Peter Wood; Ian Loveseth c Pen: Gary Townsend		Try: David Jenkinson c Con: Scott Bertrand; Pen: Scott Bertrand (2)

Oakbrook, IL

28 May 1983

Midwest	13–7	Eastern
Try: Jake Burkhardt 50'; Pen: Roger Castino 1H', 75'; Drop: Tom Beckmann 70'		Try: Pete Sweet 8'; Pen: Hugh O'Neill 22'

Oakbrook, IL

29 May 1983

Midwest	12–10	Western
Try: Kevin Moylan; Keith Blair; Paul Pauluzzi		Try: Dave Jenkinson c Gregg Wilson; Con: Scott Bertrand

Oakbrook, IL

29 May 1983

Pacific Coast	8–3	Eastern
Try: Mike Schaub 1H'; Mike Schaub 60'		Pen: Hugh O'Neill

Oakbrook, IL

30 May 1983

Western	27–12	Eastern
Try: Hal Edwards c Billy Scheer; Scott Bertrand 38'; Drew Allen c Skip Niebauer; Con: Scott Bertrand; Pen: Scott Bertrand		Try: Pete Sweet 15', 30', 2H'

Oakbrook, IL

30 May 1983

Pacific Coast	23–6	Midwest
Try: Dave Bateman 12'; Tom Schnebeck; Tom Schnebeck c Willie Jefferson c Con: Gary Townsend (2/4); Pen: Gary Townsend 60'		Pen: Roger Castino 1H', 62'

Oakbrook, IL

Team		W	L	F	A
1	Pacific Coast Grizzlies	3	0	48	21
2	Midwest Thunderbirds	2	1	31	40
3	Western Mustangs	1	2	49	41
4	Eastern Colonials	0	3	22	48

Champions: Pacific Coast Grizzlies
Staff: Nesbit (Coach), Dawson (Coach), Parnell (Doctor), Batt (Coach), Rod Sears (Coach), Dan Hickey (Manager)
Roster: Dave Bateman–Scrumhalf (Old Blues), Bobby Blahnik-Center (Newport), Buster Bustanabe–Flanker (Newport), Pete Deddeh-#8 (OMBAC), John Everett-Hooker (Old Blues), Whit Everett–Flanker (Old Blues), John Fowler–#8 (Santa Monica), Ian Gunn–Fullback (Old Puget Sound), Jay Herron–Flanker (Valley), John Jelaco–Prop (BATS), Ian Loveseth–Lock (BATS), John Marston–Lock (Portland), Floyd McGaughey-Scrumhalf (Seahawks), Peter McLaughlin-Prop (Seahawks), Mike Schaub–Wing (Belmont Shore), Tom Schnebeck-Center (Snake River), Denis Shanagher-Center (BATS), Tom Smith-Flyhalf (Santa Monica), Mike Tortorica-Hooker (Old Puget Sound), Gary Townsend–Fullback (Seahawks), Terry Whelan–Prop (BATS), Peter Wood–Wing (Old Puget Sound).

== High School ==
The 1983 National High School Rugby Championship took place at Lincoln Field in Washington, D.C. May 30. Langley High of McLean, Virginia were the champions. Langley had a season record of 12–0. Serra of San Mateo, California had a season record of 25–3–4.

=== Championship ===
30 May 1983
1:00PM

Langley	13–9	Serra
Try: David Robertson; 62' Michael Brendis c Con: David MacLaury; Pen: David MacLaury		Try: Pauli Mahoni c Con: Steve Forster; Pen: 55' Steve Forster

Washington, D.C.
Attendance: 2000

Lineups:
Langley– Brooks H. Lowery (Coach), David Robertson (Prop), Ivan Lopez–Muniz (Captain/Hooker), Dail, J.P. Forest (2nd Row), Colwell, John Lucidi (Flanker), Chris Cavicke (Flanker), Scott Lucidi (#8), Michael Brenois (Scrumhalf), Bourscheid, MacLaury(Captain), John Holden, Pierson, Kim, Aros.
Serra– Fred Forester (Coach), Latu Tamuoepau (Prop), Brian Mifsud (Hooker), Valentine Connolly (Prop), Rossi, Lococo, Walter Bugler, Paul Fazzio, Frank Lux, Kaneaiakala, Stephen Forester (Captain/Flyhalf), William Caldarelli, Mahoni, Chris MacCari (Wing), Holland, Wigney.
