= 1992 National Rugby Championships =

Tournament details
- Tournament format(s): Various
- Date: 1992

Tournament statistics

Final

The 1992 National Rugby Championships were a series of tournaments organized by the United States RFU to determine a national champion in several divisions for United States rugby teams. The divisions included club, college, high school, military, sevens, inter-territorial and local union.

== Men's Club ==
The 1992 USA Rugby National Club Championship took place at Englewood High School in Denver, CO from May 9–10. The teams featured in the tournament were the champions of the four sub unions of USARFU. Old Blues of Berkeley, CA won its eighth national title. Flyhalf Chris O'Brien, inside center Rich Pearson, and lock Mike Rusinek of Old Blues were the MVPs.

Regional Semifinal
April 11 - San Francisco, CA
Old Blues	30
OMBAC	12
April 11 - San Francisco, CA
Golden Gate	13
Belmont Shore	7
November 9 - Chicago, IL
Chicago Lions
November 9 - Chicago, IL
Pittsburgh
December 7 - Baton Rouge, LA
Mystic River	15
Potomac AC	9
December 7 - Baton Rouge, LA
Life Chiropractic	32
Charlotte	4
April 25 - Dallas, TX
Dallas Harlequins	46
Kansas City Blues	16
April 25 - Dallas, TX
St. Louis Bombers	18
Houston	6

Regional Final
April 12 - San Francisco, CA
Old Blues	24
Golden Gate	6
November 10 - Chicago, IL
Chicago Lions	24
Pittsburgh	3
December 8 - Baton Rouge, LA
Mystic River	20
Life Chiropractic	0
April 26 - Dallas, TX
Dallas Harlequins	37
St. Louis Bombers	3

National Semifinal
May 9 - Denver, CO
Old Blues	32
Chicago Lions	9
May 9 - Denver, CO
Mystic River	29
Dallas Harlequins	4

National Final
May 10 - Denver, CO
Old Blues	33
Mystic River	9
Third place
May 10 - Denver, CO
Dallas Harlequins	30
Chicago Lions	7

=== Semifinals ===
9 May 1992

Old Blues	32–9	Chicago Lions
Try: Mike Rusinek 6' c Wayne Chai 20'; Mike Rusinek 49' c Rich Pearson 69' c Tom Healy; Con: Chris O'Brien; Pen: Chris O'Brien 30', 75'		Pen: Dave Richards 10', 26', 1H'

Denver, CO
Referee: Mark Binning (Potomac)

9 May 1992

Mystic River	29–4	Dallas Harlequins
Try: Larry Docimo c Kevin Brown 16' c Jim Calmas 21'; Kevin Brown 48'; Brent Goldstein c Con: Alec Montgomery; Pen: Alec Montgomery 72'		Try: Jim Aston 58'

Denver, CO
Referee: Dave Head (SoCal)

=== Third place ===
10 May 1992
1:00PM

Dallas Harlequins	30–7	Chicago Lions
Try: Richard Van Druten 21' c Peter Jones 26' c Brent Pedersen 36' c Doug Neubauer 56' c Jim Aston 65'; Con: Mark Gale; Pen: Mark Gale 5', 17'		Try: David Skidmore; Pen: Dave Richards 14'

Denver, CO
Referee: Mark Binning (Potomac)

=== Final ===
10 May 1992
3:00PM

Old Blues	33–9	Mystic River
Try: Steve Hiatt c Mike Rusinek c Gary Hein 79' c Con: Chris O'Brien; Pen: Chris O'Brien 15', 21', 28', 1H', 50'		Try: Alec Montgomery 37' c Con: Alec Montgomery; Pen: Alec Montgomery 51'

Denver, CO
Attendance: 1500
Referee: Dave Head (SoCal)

Champions: Old Blues RFC
Staff: Jerry Figone (Manager), Tim O'Brien (Coach), Blane Warhurst (Asst. Coach)
Captain: Rich Pearson (Center)
Roster: Mark Bass (#8), Tom Billups (Hooker), Gus Carrell (Flanker), Wayne Chai (Center), Mike Conn (Hooker), Andre Corpuz (Scrumhalf), Kieth Cockett (Wing/FB), Eric Grady (Wing), Tom Healy (Flanker), Gary Hein (Wing), Rich Hextrum (#8), Steve Hiatt (Wing/FB), Pat Hibler (Prop), Jeremy Howell (Fullback), Greg Hulbert (Lock), Don James (Prop), Dean Klisura (Wing), Drew Marich (Center), Chris Motes (Flyhalf), Chris O'Brien (Flyhalf), Tim Peterson (Prop), Kevin Perry (Prop), Mike Rusinek (Lock), Ramon Samaniego (Scrumhalf), Greg Stoehr (Flanker), Brian Walgenbach (Flanker).

== Club Division II ==
The 1992 National Division II Championship was the inaugural edition of this tournament held May 16–17 at the Battleship Parkway in Mobile, AL. The Battleship club of Mobile, Alabama was the host and the first champion.

Regional Semifinal
December 7 - Baton Rouge, LA
Battleship	28
Hilton Head	12
December 7 - Baton Rouge, LA
Burlington	44
Connecticut Yankees	0
April 25 - Dallas, TX
Bay Area
April 25 - Dallas, TX
Queen City
May 10 - Lexington, KY
Nashville	W
L
May 10 - Lexington, KY
Wisconsin	19
Cleveland Cats	6
April 4 - Santa Barbara, CA
Santa Rosa
April 4 - Santa Barbara, CA
Occidental Old Boys

Regional Final
December 8 - Baton Rouge, LA
Battleship	19
Burlington	13
April 25 - Dallas, TX
Bay Area	19
Queen City	17
May 10 - Lexington, KY
Nashville	14
Wisconsin	3
April 4 - Santa Barbara, CA
Santa Rosa	15
Occidental Old Boys	0

National Semifinal
May 16 - Mobile, AL
Battleship	23
Bay Area	3
May 16 - Mobile, AL
Nashville	9
Santa Rosa	8

National Final
May 17 - Mobile, AL
Battleship	12
Nashville	11
Third place
May 17 - Mobile, AL
Santa Rosa	36
Bay Area	3

Semifinals

16 May 1992
12:30PM

Nashville	9–8	Santa Rosa
Try: David Brooks 80+' c Con: Phillip Neil; Pen: Phillip Neil 53'		Try: Maddock Monroe; Jason Mihaere 59'

Mobile, AL
Referee: Laurel Lockett (Eastern)

16 May 1992

Battleship	23–3	Bay Area
Try: Eric Dayton 6' c John Friend 22' c Eric Dayton 1H'; Randy Holbein 2H'; Con: Scott Montague; Pen: Scott Montague		Pen: Jim Engler 77'

Mobile, AL
Referee: Jerry McLemore (Midwest)

Third place

17 May 1992
11:00AM

Santa Rosa	36–3	Bay Area
Try: Kelly Gilligan; Mike McKamey; Afese Wongking; Todd Bartolone; Jeff Dunbar; Afese Wongking; Doug Orr; Kevin Wolski; Con: Matt Eshoo; Kevin Wolski		Drop: Gary Mitchell

Mobile, AL
Referee: Laurel Lockett (Eastern)

Final

17 May 1992
1:00PM

Battleship	12–11	Nashville
Try: Jimmy Boyd 19' c Jesse Nicholes 52' c Con: Scott Montague		Try: David Watkins; Tony Neely 57'; Pen: Phillip Neil 80+'

Mobile, AL
Referee: Jerry McLemore (Mid–South)

Champions: Battleship
Coach: Gary Thwaits
Captains: Charles Bowen (#8), Randy Stroecker (Flanker/#8)
Roster: Brad Bassett (Prop), Joe Bolton (Prop), Jimmy Boyd (Wing), Joe Calagaz (Prop), Matt Capo (Scrumhalf), Chip Conklin (Prop), Evans Crowe (Wing), Eric Dayton (Center), Greg Daoust (Lock), Sean Duffy (Flanker), Stacy Earls (Scrumhalf), Rick Faust (Center), John Friend (Center), Mark Gries (Fullback), Randy Holbein (Hooker), Mike Leach (Lock), Billy MacWilliam (Center), Scott Montague (Flyhalf), James Montaine (Fullback), Jessie Nicholes (Wing), Keith Parton (Hooker), Greg Roberts (Lock), Joe Tucker (Prop), Reid Wakefield (Lock), Jimmy Wiseman (Lock).

== Women's Club ==
The 1992 Women's National Rugby Championship was a tournament was played at Blaine Sports Center in Minneapolis, MN on May 23–24. The Bay Area Shehawks won the title by defeating Berkeley All–Blues 19–0. Beantown took third place.

Quarterfinals

23 May 1992

Shehawks	52–4	U of Colorado Rainbows

Minneapolis, MN

23 May 1992

Beantown	12–8 (OT)	Chicago

Minneapolis, MN

23 May 1992

Berkeley All–Blues	W–L	Colorado Old Girls

Minneapolis, MN

23 May 1992

Florida State	24–21	Twin Cities Amazons

Minneapolis, MN

Consolation semifinals

23 May 1992

Chicago	32–0	U of Colorado Rainbows

Minneapolis, MN

23 May 1992

Twin Cities Amazons	W–L	Colorado Old Girls

Minneapolis, MN

Seventh place

23 May 1992

Colorado Old Girls	24–0	U of Colorado Rainbows

Minneapolis, MN

Fifth place

23 May 1992

Chicago	3–0	Twin Cities Amazons

Minneapolis, MN

Semifinals

23 May 1992

Shehawks	10–4	Beantown
Try: Barbara Bond 8'; Pen: Joslin Bergman 16', 50'		Try: Mary Dixey

Minneapolis, MN
Referee: Tom Heffelfinger (Minnesota)

23 May 1992

Berkeley All–Blues	28–8	Florida State
Try: Maren Klawiter c Kim Wilson c Maren Klawiter 25'; Kim Wilson 35'; Jen Crawford 73' c Con: Jen Crawford (3); Maren Klawiter		Try: Patty Jervey 70', 79'

Minneapolis, MN
Referee: Seegar Swanson (Atlanta)

Third place

24 May 1992

Beantown	16–0	Florida State
Try: Sue Robicheaux 2'; Mary Sullivan 14' c Con: Amy Westerman; Pen: Amy Westerman 33', 55'

Minneapolis, MN
Referee: Tom Heffelfinger (Minnesota)

Final

24 May 1992

Shehawks	19–0	Berkeley All–Blues
Try: Karen Kelly 36'; Joslin Bergman 47'; Sandy Meredith 58'; Kim Miskon 70'; Pen: Joslin Bergman 7'

Minneapolis, MN
Referee: Mark Binning (Potomac)

== College ==
The 1992 College championship was won by UC Berkeley with a win over Army. Boston College won the second edition of the Women's Collegiate Championship. The College All–Star Championship was won by the Pacific Coast while the East was runner–up.

== Military ==
The 1992 National Military Rugby Championship took place at Kelly Air Force Base in San Antonio, TX from May 9–10. The initial stage consisted of eight groups with three teams each after which teams progressed to Cup, Plate, and Boot playoffs based on their placement. The club division was won by Pensacola with a win over Monterey Bay. The open division was won by the President's XV with a win over MUTTS. Bill Bryan of President's XV won the Chairman's Kicking Cup contest.

Path to championship:
Pensacola 35–0 Camp Iwakuni
Pensacola 29–0 Fort Leonard Wood

Path to final:
Monterey Bay 15–0 Cherry Point
Monterey Bay 12–9 Eglin

Cup bracket

Quarter-finals
May 10 – San Antonio, TX
Camp Lejeune	0
Pensacola	25
May 10 – San Antonio, TX
Wright Patterson	12
Fort Bragg	0
May 10 – San Antonio, TX
Monterey Bay	26
Fort Sill	0
May 10 – San Antonio, TX
Fort Carson	0
USUHS	7

Semi-finals
May 10 – San Antonio, TX
Pensacola	24
Wright Patterson	0
May 10 – San Antonio, TX
Monterey Bay	7
USUHS	3

Final
May 10 – San Antonio, TX
Pensacola	21
Monterey Bay	9

Club Championship

10 May 1992
2:30PM

Pensacola	21–9	Monterey Bay

Kelly AFB, TX

Plate bracket

Quarter-finals
May 10 – San Antonio, TX
Seymour Johnson	12
Iwakuni	3
May 10 – San Antonio, TX
Fort Polk	9
Camp Pendleton	6
May 10 – San Antonio, TX
Eglin AFB	16
Quantico	0
May 10 – San Antonio, TX
Yuma	4
Kadena	12

Semi-finals
May 10 – San Antonio, TX
Seymour Johnson	L
Fort Polk	W
May 10 – San Antonio, TX
Eglin AFB	W
Kadena	L

Final
May 10 – San Antonio, TX
Ft. Polk	11
Eglin AFB	7

Open Division

Semifinals
May 10 – San Antonio, TX
President's XV	W
FE Warren	L
May 10 – San Antonio, TX
Whiteman AFB	W
Fort Hood	L

Final
May 10 – San Antonio, TX
President's XV	27
MUTTS	6

The 1992 Interservice Rugby Championship was held the Pensacola Naval Air Station in Florida from 10 to 12 September. The teams involved were select sides of each service branch. From these teams a selection was made to field the Combined Services Rugby team for tours. Air Force was the champion and Air Force Lock Dave Gaines was MVP.

Round Robin					Scores				
Rank	Standings	Pld	W	L	AIR	NAV	ARM	MAR	COA
1.	Air Force	4	3	1	X	19:10	12:0	17:0	6:17
2.	Navy	4	3	1	10:19	X	15:8	8:0	29:5
3.	Army	4	2	2	0:12	8:15	X	12:5	18:9
4.	Marines	4	1	3	0:17	0:8	5:12	X	21:6
5.	Coast Guard	4	1	3	17:6	5:29	9:18	6:21	X

Wooden Spoon
Coast Guard

Third place

12 September 1992

Marines	12–7	Army
Try: Rodney Washington 1H'; Rodney Washington 2H' c Con: Marcus Skarf		Try: Mark Lent c Con: Chuck May

Pensacola, FL
Referee: Bill Nelson (Potomac)

Championship

12 September 1992

Air Force	24–18	Navy
Try: Dave Gaines 17'; Joe Goodwin c Tom Fitzgerald; Dave Gaines 47' c Con: Brian Moore		Try: Gary Stasco 44'; Gabe Puello 78' c Con: Ted Veazy; Pen: Ted Veazy 21', 33'

Pensacola, FL
Referee: Bruce Carter (NorCal)

Lineups:
Navy– Gary Stasco, Diguardo, Jackson, Gabe Puello, Walker, Guynan, McGregor (Wick), Haddad, Mark Pidcock, Shay, Sinibaldi (Hardigan), Lien, Long, Williams, Ted Veazy.
Air Force– Danny Meredith (Coach), Jim Snyder (Prop), Ricky Coveno (Hooker), Jim Bachelor (Prop), Steve Gaines (Mike Barker), John Perlstein (Lock), Larry Grant (Guy Wells), David Gaines (Captain), Jim Kowaleski (#8), Mike Graham (Scrumhalf), Mike Sergeant (Flyhalf), Andy Hamann (Wing), Fred Gregory (Captain), Tom Fitzgerald (Center), Joe Goodwin (Wing), Brian Moore (Fullback).

== Sevens ==
=== Club ===
The 1992 National Club Sevens championship, was played at Lee District Park in Alexandria, Virginia on 22–23 August. There were eight teams featured which included two representatives from each of the four territorial unions. Metro and Louisville qualified from the Midwest. Maryland Old Boys and Northern Virginia qualified from the East. Old Blues and Old Puget Sound Beach represented the Pacific Coast. Dallas Harlequins and Kansas City Blues represented the West. Old Puget Sound Beach defeated Old Blues to win the championship. MOB finished third when NOVA, after initially winning the third place match, was disqualified for using players not on their roster. Mike Telkamp of Old Puget Sound Beach was MVP.

Pool 1
First round

- OPSB 24–0 Metro Mercenaries
- NOVA 26–4 Dallas Harlequins

Second round

- OPSB 18–6 NOVA
- Dallas Harlequins 12–12 Metro Mercenaries

Third round

- OPSB 31–0 Dallas Harlequins
- NOVA 22–6 Metro Mercenaries

Pool 2
First round

- MOB 6–6 Kansas City Blues
- Old Blues 30–12 Louisville

Second round

- Old Blues 15–10 MOB
- Kansas City Blues 24–4 Louisville

Third round

- MOB 54–0 Louisville
- Old Blues 28–6 Kansas City Blues

Consolation bracket
Semifinals

- Kansas City Blues 24–6 Dallas Harlequins
- Metro Mercenaries 22–12 Louisville

Seventh place

22 August 1992

Dallas Harlequins	12–8	Louisville
Try: Jeff Foreman c Lee Goodman c Con: Dick Baker; Pen: Mike Telkamp		Try: John Montgomery; Jamie Rankin

Alexandria, VA

Fifth place

22 August 1992

Kansas City Blues	36–0	Metro Mercenaries
Try: Joe Fridkin (3) c John Franklin (2) c Paul Tripp c Con: Chuck McKeon (6)

Alexandria, VA

Championship bracket
Semifinals

23 August 1992

Old Puget Sound Beach	21–6	Maryland Old Boys
Try: Dave Bateman c Jim Burgett c Dave Bateman c Con: Mike Telkamp; Pen: Mike Telkamp		Try: Will Brewington c Con: John Redmond

Alexandria, VA

23 August 1992

Old Blues	24–10	Northern Virginia
Try: Eric Whitaker c Tom Billups c Chris O'Brien c Rich Dahlquist c Con: Tommy Smith (1); Chris O'Brien (2)		Try: Jim Wilkinson; Joe Anderson c Con: David Dean

Alexandria, VA

Third place

23 August 1992

Northern Virginia	18–16	Maryland Old Boys
Try: Brian Moore c Tommy Williams c Don Schleicher c Con: David Dean (3)		Try: Vince Granger (2); Steve Burnham; Con: John Redmond

Alexandria, VA

==== Final ====
23 August 1992

Old Puget Sound Beach	15–6	Old Blues
Try: Mike Telkamp c Mike Telkamp c Con: Mike Telkamp; Pen: Mike Telkamp		Try: Gary Hein c Con: Chris O'Brien

Alexandria, VA
Referee: Mark Binning (Potomac)

Champions: Old Puget Sound Beach
Staff: Chuck Depew (Manager), Joe Zakowski (Asst. Manager)
Captain: Dave Dateman (Scrumhalf)
Roster: John Seitz, Dick Kelepi, Ty Adams, Mike Telkamp, Finau Puloka, Tony Ridnell, Alden Hough, Jim Burgett.

=== All Star ===
The 1992 National All-Star Sevens rugby tournament was an eight team tournament with two representatives from each territory. Similar to the ITTs, the other purpose of the tournament was to select members for the U.S. Eagles Seven–a–side team. This years tournament took place at Lee District Park in Alexandria, VA from 22 to 23 August. The East I team won the final 22–14 over the East II team. West I came in third. East center Al Dekin was MVP.

Group A
First round

- East II 16–6 Midwest I
- Pacific I 16–6 West II

Second round

- East II 16–12 Pacific I
- Midwest I 28–0 West II

Third round

- East II 26–0 West II
- Pacific I 12–4 Midwest I

Group B
First round

- East I 20–6 Midwest II
- West I 10–10 Pacific II

Second round

- East I 36–0 Pacific II
- West I 40–12 Midwest II

Third round

- East I 34–0 West I
- Pacific II 38–6 Midwest II

Consolation bracket
Semifinals

- Pacific II 18–12 West II
- Midwest I 10–0 Midwest II

Seventh place

23 August 1992

West II	12–4	Midwest II
Try: Steven Boozer c Steve Binion c Con: Bruce Migliaccio		Try: Chris Mack

Alexandria, VA

Fifth place

23 August 1992

Pacific II	18–6	Midwest I
Try: Mike Moe (2); Rick Zubiate; Tom Short; Con: Mike Moe (1)		Try: Jeff Simon c Con: Jeff Teliczan

Alexandria, VA

Semifinals

23 August 1992

East II	28–6	West I
Try: Jeff Dumpson c John Flamish John Flamish c Larry Sims c John Flamish c Con: Martin O'Connor (2)		Try: Andy Dujakovich c Con: Tom Dujakovich

Alexandria, VA

23 August 1992

East I	24–6	Pacific I
Try: Steve Siano; Rory Lewis; Al Dekin c Steve Siano c Mike Siano; Con: Al Dekin		Try: Chad Humphreys c Con: George Conahey

Alexandria, VA

Third place

23 August 1992

West I	20–12	Pacific I
Try: Andy Dujakovich; Dewayne Williamson; Thaddeus Hill; Joey Sesto; Con: Joey Sesto (2)		Try: Solo Komai c George Conahey c Con: George Conahey

Alexandria, VA

==== Final ====
23 August 1992

East I	22–14	East II
Try: Al Dekin c Carter Mann; George Conahey c Al Dekin c Al Dekin c Con: Al Dekin		Try: Paul Myers; Ellis Graves c Lyndon Gross; Con: Martin O'Connor

Alexandria, VA
Referee: Ed Sorensen (EPRU)

Champions: East I
Staff: Bob Davis (Manager), George Betzler (Coach)
Roster: Tom Brewer, Al Dekin, Dave Priestas, Rory Lewis, Carter Mann, Brian Driscoll, Scott Stephens, Mike Siano, Steve Siano.

== ITT ==
The Inter Territorial Tournament involved the four regional rugby unions comprising the United States RFU: Pacific Coast RFU, Western RFU, Midwest RFU, and the Eastern Rugby Union. The region teams are formed with players selected from the sub regional rugby unions. Subsequently, the USA Eagles are selected from the four regional teams after the ITT concludes. In 1992 The National All–Star Championship took place at Blaine Sports Center in Minneapolis, MN from May 23–25. The Western Mustangs won the tournament with three wins. The MVPs were Western scrumhalves David James and Greg Goodman.

Results:

23 May 1992

West	20–18	East
Try: Chris Schlereth; Mark Gale c Chris Schlereth 68'; Con: Mark Gale; Pen: Mark Gale 1H', 54'		Try: Ed Simpson 60' c Joe Burke c Con: Glenn Judge; Pen: Glenn Judge; Drop: Glenn Judge 73'

Minneapolis, MN
Referee: Dave Head (SoCal)

23 May 1992

Pacific Coast	26–15	Midwest
Try: Mahu Latu 43'; Dean Steinbauer 50' c Ryan Kelly; Con: Rod Caborn; Pen: Rod Caborn (4)		Try: Thor Bolstad c Con: Tony Konczak; Pen: Tony Konczak (3)

Minneapolis, MN
Referee: Mark Binning (Potomac)

24 May 1992

West	34–31	Pacific Coast
Try: Tom Dujakovich 7' c Mike Glass; David James c Jay Wilkerson; Con: Mark Gale; Pen: Mark Gale 3', 38', 45', 53', 78'; Drop: Mark Gale 18'		Try: Mike Moe 14' c David Steinbauer 42' c Via Anatoni c Mike Moe 58' c Con: Barry Tofaeono; Pen: Barry Tofaeono 28'

Minneapolis, MN
Referee: Bob Loftus (CARFU)

24 May 1992

East	29–3	Midwest
Try: Britt Howard 25' c Tom Brewer 31'; Mike Szymanski 52'; Joe Hanley; Joe Burke; Con: Chris Liles; Pen: Chris Liles 7'		Pen: Tony Konczak 12'

Minneapolis, MN
Referee: Ed Sorensen (East Penn)

25 May 1992

Pacific Coast	30–26	East
Try: Via Anatoni 29' c Larry Docimo c Don James 61' c Con: Rod Caborn; Pen: Rod Caborn 13', 42', 73, 77'		Try: Mark Gaetjen; Jim Keller c Marcus Maffei; Con: Glenn Judge; Pen: Glenn Judge 10', 35', 58', 2H'

Minneapolis, MN
Referee: Don Reordan (SoCal)

25 May 1992

West	19–7	Midwest
Try: Greg Goodman 32' c Greg Goodman c Chris Schlereth; Con: Mel Brooke; Pen: Mel Brooke 47'		Try: Scott Bush 28'; Pen: Tony Konczak 6'

Minneapolis, MN
Referee: Scott Miller (Eastern Rockies)

Team		W	L	F	A
1	Western Mustangs	3	0	73	56
2	Pacific Coast Grizzlies	2	1	87	75
3	Eastern Colonials	1	2	73	53
4	Midwest Thunderbirds	0	3	25	74

Champions: Western Mustangs
Staff: Larry Naifeh (Coach), Ron Laszewski (Asst.), John Godsman (Manager), Carrie Guvito (Trainer)
Captains Mark Pedersen–Flanker (Houston), Greg Goodman–Scrumhalf (Dallas Harlequins)
Roster: Locks– Jim Angstman (Dallas Harlequins), Tony Duplisse (Dallas Harlequins), Lynn Glatt (St. Louis Bombers), Norbert Mueller (Dallas Harlequins); Flyhalves– Mel Brooke (Dallas Reds), Mark Gale (Dallas Harlequins); Hookers– Steve Brown (Boulder), Bruce Monroe (Dallas Harlequins); Flankers– Lee Cooke (Dallas Harlequins), Paul Tripp (Kansas City Blues), Mark Van Der Molen (Denver Barbarians); Centers– Tom Dujakovich (Kansas City), Kevin Harder (Kansas University), Greg Kreutzer (Columbia Outlaws), Michael Mazerolle (Houston Old Boys), Michael Waterman (Dallas Harlequins); Wings– Mike Glass (New Mexico Brujos), Chris Schlereth (St. Louis Bombers); Scrumhalves– David James (Denver Barbarians); #8s– Greg Gurke (Springfield), Brannan Smoot (Dallas Harlequins); Props– Brian Monaghan (Dallas Reds), Norman Mottram (Boulder), Shane Skubis (Denver Barbarians), John Toole (Denver Barbarians); Fullback– Mike Slagle (Houston).

Junior ITT
The 1992 Junior All–Star Championship took place in Minneapolis, MN from May 23–25. The East won with a 3–0 record.

23 May 1992

East	45–3	West
Try: Todd Merolla; Con: Todd Merolla (4); Pen: Todd Merolla (3)

Minneapolis, MN

23 May 1992

Midwest	19–10	Minnesota

Minneapolis, MN

24 May 1992

Minnesota	45–13	West
Try: Rich Everson (2); Dan Wolfgram (2); Paul Coltergelli; Con: Matt Comstock (4); Pen: Matt Comstock (3)		Try: Eric Mayer; Joe Kessler; Con: Dan Reddington (1); Pen: Dan Reddington (1)

Minneapolis, MN

24 May 1992

East	10–7	Midwest
Try: Jeff Preston; Pen: Cormack Kelly; Drop: Todd Merolla		Try: Sean Rooney; Pen: Russ Howland

Minneapolis, MN

25 May 1992

East	41–10	Minnesota
Try: Doug Erickson (2); Con: Billy O'Connell (3); Pen: Billy O'Connell (3)		Try: Pete Wildenberg; Pete Ruffe; Con: Matt Comstock (1)

Minneapolis, MN

25 May 1992

Midwest	58–4	West

Minneapolis, MN

Champions: Eastern Junior Colonials
Staff: Jim Cross (Coach), George Henderson (Asst.), Jim Snape (Asst.), Tom Alderton (Mgr), Keith Shurett (Mgr)
Roster: Props– Bill Kelly (Rockaway), John Lafferty (OMEX), Paul Shaneyfelt (Old Blue), Conan Ward (Columbia); Hookers– Bruce McClane (Monmouth), Bob Yale (Chesapeake); Locks– Kevin Barry (Bethlehem), Ward Dement (Sarasota), Jack Dyer (South Jersey), Michael Laczkowski (Syracuse Chargers); Flankers– Doug Erickson (Syracuse Chargers), Ben Farley (Charleston), Bob Maguire (Monmouth), Clay Williams (Life College); #8s– Robb White (Space Coast), Matt Winters (Hibernians); Scrumhalves– Cormack Kelly (Space Coast), Buzzy Sullivan (Hilton Head); Flyhalves– Todd Merolla (Atlanta), Billy O'Connell (Albany Knicks); Centers– Mark Eames (Old Blue), Alan Erickson (Charles River), Eric Dayton (Battleship), Jeff Preston (West Chester U.); Wings– Jeff Allen (South Jersey), Mike Augustine (Buffalo Old Boys), Geoff Blue (Union County), Terry Nashwinter (Buffalo Old Boys); Fullbacks– Jeff Akin (Syracuse University), Greg Howard (Atlanta).

Women's ITT
The sixth edition of the Women's ITT was hosted by Florida State and played from February 1–2 in Tallahassee, FL. The tournament was won by the Pacific Coast with East in second and Midwest was third.

1 February 1992

East	16–3	Midwest
Try: Claire Godwin; Amy Westerman c Margie McClure c Con: Amy Westerman		Pen: Christie Nixon

Tallahassee, FL
Referee: Mike Geach (Texas)

1 February 1992

Pacific Coast	46–7	West
Try: Jen Crawford (2); Ava Mason (3); Sandy Meredith (2); Suna Kneisley; Cassie Law; Tara Flanagan; Con: Jen Crawford (3)		Try: Krista McFarren; Pen: Krista McFarren

Tallahassee, FL
Referee: Bob Loftus (CARFU)

1 February 1992

Pacific Coast	27–0	Midwest
Try: Trisha Harper 30'; Trisha Harper c Suna Kneisley (2); Jen Crawford c Con: Jen Crawford; Pen: Jen Crawford

Tallahassee, FL
Referee: Jerry McLemore (Mid South)

1 February 1992

East	42–4	West
Try: Kathy Flores 12'; Julie Drustrup; Mary Sullivan c Julie Drustrup; Mary Sullivan (2); Laurie Spicer; Colleen Chapin; Lisa Hill; Con: Julie Drustrup (3); Pen: Amy Westerman		Try: Krista McFarren

Tallahassee, FL
Referee: Gary Court (Florida)

2 February 1992

Midwest	11–4	West
Try: Erika Wolf; Terese Taylor; Pen: Christie Nixon		Try: Kathy Brown

Tallahassee, FL
Referee: Mike Geach (Texas)

2 February 1992

Pacific Coast	14–11	East
Try: Trisha Harper c Ava Mason; Con: Jen Crawford; Pen: Jen Crawford (2)		Try: Julie Drustrup; Patty Jervey; Pen: Julie Drustrup

Tallahassee, FL
Referee: Bob Loftus (CARFU)

== Local Union ==
The 1992 National Local Union Championship was the first edition of the tournament and took place in Lemont, IL from June 6–7. This tournament brought together the Local Union champions of the four regional territories. Metropolitan New York represented the Eastern RU, Chicago Area represented the Midwest RFU, Texas represented the Western RFU, and Pacific Northwest (Seattle–Portland) represented the Pacific Coast RFU. The Pacific Northwest Loggers were the champions. Pacific Northwest fullback Mike Telkamp was Most Valuable back and Pacific Northwest lock Chris Campbell was Most Valuable forward.

Semifinals

6 June 1992

Chicago Area	28–12	Met New York
Try: Matt Pickston 9'; Scott Bush 35'; Andy Kuhlmann 40+'; Jeff Simon 49' c Tom Simon; Con: Matt Pickston; Pen: Matt Pickston 5', 71'		Try: Dare Studevant 61' c Paul Marden 67' c Con: Gianni Lopez

Lemont, IL
Referee: Mark Binning (Potomac)

6 June 1992

Pacific Northwest	42–24	Texas
Try: Brendan Mahaffey 8' c Finau Puloka 35' c Joe Rissone 66' c Josh Baldi 69' c Jon Knutson c Con: Mike Telkamp 24', 34', 52', 62'; Pen: Mike Telkamp 71'		Try: Paul McCartney 30' c Seamus McNabb c Paul McCartney c Con: Mel Brooke; Pen: Mel Brooke; Drop: Mel Brooke 36'

Lemont, IL
Referee: Bob Loftus (CARFU)

Third place

7 June 1992

Met New York	41–10	Texas
Try: Tim Walsh (2); Joe Casella; Bill Laczkowski; Steve Repeta; Jim Greene; Dave Flemister; Con: Gianni Lopez (5); Pen: Gianni Lopez

Lemont, IL
Referee: Bob Loftus (CARFU)

Final

7 June 1992
2:00PM

Pacific Northwest	21–9	Chicago Area
Try: Dave Horton 69' c Josh Baldi c Con: Mike Telkamp; Pen: Mike Telkamp 2', 22', 27'		Pen: Craig Morse 33', 45', 65'

Lemont, IL
Referee: Mark Binning (Potomac)

Champions: Pacific Northwest Loggers
Staff: Dick Smith (Owner), Jim Gourley (Manager), John Clark (Head Coach), Brad Young (Coach)
Roster: Props– Jerry Baldocchi (Portland), Jason Ray (Seattle), Joe Rissone (Seattle); Hookers– Mike Housh (Old Puget Sound Beach), Tom Radcliff (Oregon Sports Union); Locks– Cris Campbell (Old Puget Sound Beach), Peter York (Oregon Sports Union); Flankers– Greg Bartelt (Seattle), Alden Hough (Old Puget Sound Beach), Brendan Mahaffey (Seattle); #8s– Tony Ridnell (Old Puget Sound Beach), Craig Wicks (Seattle); Scrumhalves– Gil Rosenthal (Oregon Sports Union), Chris Thomson (Valley); Flyhalf– Dave Horton (Old Puget Sound Beach); Centers– Josh Baldi (Seattle), Dave Carter (Oregon Sports Union), Jon Knutson (Old Puget Sound Beach); Wings– Dave Moss (Oregon Sports Union), Finau Puloka (Old Puget Sound Beach); Fullbacks– Dan Finnegan (Seattle), Tom Payne (Seattle), Mike Telkamp (Old Puget Sound Beach).

== High School ==
The 1992 National High School Rugby Championship was an eight team tournament that took place from 15 to 16 May at Lenape Middle School in Doylestown, PA. The Highland squad from Salt Lake City, Utah won the championship by defeating the St. Louis Druids in the final.

Quarterfinals

15 May 1992
3:00PM

1 Highland (UT)	14–3	8 North Penn (PA)
Try: Nate Fihaki; David Vaea; Andy Brinton; Con: Basil Morgan (1)		Pen: Greg Cooney

Doylestown, PA

15 May 1992
4:00PM

5 Doylestown (PA)	6–3	4 Ben Davis (IN)
Pen: Rick Dortone (2)		Pen: Trinity Hines

Doylestown, PA

15 May 1992
5:00PM

St. Louis Druids (MO)	10–3	Redmond (WA)
Try: Will Caggiano; Eddie Hurley; Con: Todd Breumer (1)		Pen: Brent Nourse

Doylestown, PA

15 May 1992
6:00PM

2 Xavier (NY)	29–3	7 Douglas County (CO)
Try: Brian O'Grady (4); Alex Neir; Con: Finbar Carrig (3); Pen: Finbar Carrig		Pen: Jason Sullivan

Doylestown, PA

Consolation Semifinals

16 May 1992

North Penn	9–7	Ben Davis

Doylestown, PA

16 May 1992

Redmond	29–3	Douglas County

Doylestown, PA

Seventh place

16 May 1992

Ben Davis	8–0	Douglas County
Try: Steve Jones; Jeff Williams

Doylestown, PA

Fifth place

16 May 1992

North Penn	11–9	Redmond
Try: Pete Burns; Tony Pickersgill; Pen: Greg Cooney		Try: Ben Oates Jr. c Con: Brent Nourse; Pen: Brent Nourse

Doylestown, PA

Semifinals

16 May 1992

Highland	34–6	Doylestown
Try: John Law (2); Basil Morgan (2); Dan Berg; Greg Moreno; Shane Petersen; Con: Basil Morgan (3)		Pen: Rick Dortone

Doylestown, PA

16 May 1992

St. Louis Druids	10–3	Xavier
Try: Matt Casey; Pen: Todd Breumer (2)		Pen: Finbar Carrig

Doylestown, PA

Third place

16 May 1992

Doylestown	18–12	Xavier
Try: Penalty try c Chris Smith c Con: Rick Dortone (2); Pen: Rick Dortone (2)		Try: Robert Gallagher c Lee Thomas c Con: J.P. Vonnasis

Doylestown, PA
Attendance: 150

=== Final ===
16 May 1992

Highland	8–0	St. Louis Druids
Try: Greg Moreno 17'; Shane Petersen 28'

Doylestown, PA
Referee: Pete Hesler (Eastern Penn)

Lineups:
Highland– Larry Gelwix (Coach), Olsen, Christensen (Captain), Bradley, Hawes, Wright, Arguello, Johnson, Petersen (Scritchfield), Berg, Bourne, Moreno (Sollis), Schroepfer, Vakapuna, Law, Morgan.
St. Louis Druids– Bill Brandt (Coach), Boyer, Petland, Hess, Emms, Mullin, Helmsing, Cadini (Nevins), Roy (Captain), Caggiano, Shapiro (Captain), Casey, Boland, Hurley, Breumer, Corrigan.
