= 1990 National Rugby Championships =

Rugby tournament in the United States

Tournament details
- Tournament format(s): Various
- Date: 1990

Tournament statistics

Final

The 1990 National Rugby Championships were a series of tournaments organized by the United States RFU to determine a national champion in several divisions for United States rugby teams. The divisions included men's/women's club, college, high school, military, sevens, and inter-territorial.

== Men's Club ==
The 1990 Steinlager/USA Rugby National Club Championship took place at Englewood, CO from May 12–13. The teams featured in the tournament were the champions of the four sub unions of USARFU. On their seventh appearance at the National Championships the Denver Barbarians won the title for the first time. Washington placed third. Greg Lang of Denver was Most Valuable Forward and Mike DeJong of Denver was Most Valuable Back.

Regional Semifinal
April 28 - Dallas, TX
Denver Barbarians	22
St. Louis Ramblers	3
April 28 - Dallas, TX
Dallas Harlequins	23
Kansas University	22
November 4 - Pittsburgh, PA
Chicago Blaze	18
Minneapolis	3
November 4 - Pittsburgh, PA
Scioto Valley	15
Pittsburgh	3
April 14 - Phoenix, AZ
Berkeley Old Blues	26
Belmont Shore	18
April 14 - Phoenix, AZ
OMBAC	26
Golden Gate	12
December 2 - Orlando, FL
Washington	29
Life Chiropractic	23
December 2 - Orlando, FL
Atlanta Old White	12
Mystic River	9

Regional Final
April 29 - Dallas, TX
Denver Barbarians	23
Dallas Harlequins	0
November 5 - Pittsburgh, PA
Chicago Blaze	21
Scioto Valley	7
April 15 - Phoenix, AZ
Old Blues	24
OMBAC	12
December 3 - Orlando, FL
Washington	13
Old White	10

National Semifinal
May 12 - Englewood, CO
Denver Barbarians	15
Chicago Blaze	9
May 12 - Englewood, CO
Old Blues	32
Washington	26

National Final
May 13 - Englewood, CO
Denver Barbarians	21
Old Blues	13
Third place
May 13 - Englewood, CO
Washington	47
Chicago Blaze	15

=== Semifinals ===
12 May 1990
2:00PM

Denver Barbarians	15–9	Chicago Blaze
Try: Adam Brickner 18' c Jim Bob Glabman 78' c Con: Mike DeJong (2/2); Pen: Mike DeJong 37'		Pen: Joe Clarkson 75'; Drop: Joe Clarkson 1', 41'

Englewood, CO
Referee: Don Reordan

12 May 1990
3:40PM

Old Blues	32–26	Washington
Try: Tim O'Brien; Jeremy Howell 56'; Rick Hexstrum 70' c Con: Chris O'Brien (1/3); Pen: Chris O'Brien 24', 26', ?', ?', 65', 78'		Try: John Fenton 18'; Scott Stevens 36'; Paul Sheehy 80' c Con: Bill Bernhard (1/3); Pen: Bill Bernhard ?', 16', 47', 61'

Englewood, CO
Referee: George Gadjovich (Toronto)

=== Third place ===
13 May 1990
12:30PM

Washington	47–15	Chicago Blaze
Try: Pete Granholm 18' c Andy Crane 39' c Paul Unterkofler 50' c Andy Crane 56'; Willie Stewart 60'; Chip Henderson c Con: Paul Sheehy; Tim Cone; Pen: Paul Sheehy (3); Tim Cone 66'; Drop: Clark Wagner		Try: Scott Bush c Drop: Joe Clarkson (3)

Englewood, CO
Referee: George Gadjovich (Toronto)

=== Final ===
13 May 1990
2:00PM

Denver Barbarians	21–13	Old Blues
Try: Mike DeJong 83' c Con: Mike DeJong; Pen: Mike DeJong (3); Drop: Mike DeJong 51', ?'		Try: Moses Similai 4' c Isi Havili 53'; Con: Chris O'Brien; Pen: Chris O'Brien

Englewood, CO
Attendance: 2000
Referee: Don Reordan

Champions: Denver Barbarians
Staff: Mr. Edris (Coach), Dave Benson (President)
Captain: Mark Smith (Fullback)
Roster: Dave Benson (Prop), Bob Bloomfield (Flyhalf), Steve Brazell (Wing), Adam Brickner (#8), Mike DeJong (Flyhalf), Pat Driscoll (Lock), Tom Eccles (Flanker), Joe Garrity (Lock), Jim Glabman (Scrumhalf), Craig Hilton (Center), Russ Isaac (Lock), David James (Scrumhalf), Girant Jones (Flanker), Art Jordan (Prop), Greg Lang (Flanker), Steve LaPorta (Center), Rene Leist (Wing), Matt McConville (Hooker), Kevin Moore (Lock), Fred Paoli (Prop), Steve Ryan (Hooker), Peter Shafroth (Prop), Andy Shifman (Flanker), Tom Sitzman (Flanker), Nick Sweeney (Fullback), David Tresemer (Center).

== Women's Club ==
The 1990 Women's National Rugby Championship was a tournament was played at the National Sports Complex in Blaine, MN on May 26–27. The Belmont Shore Landsharks won the title by defeating the Bay Area SheHawks 12–3. Beantown took third place. Mary Dixey of Beantown was MVP back and Barbara Bond of the Bay Area Shehawks was MVP forward.

Quarter-finals
May 26 – Blaine, MN
Belmont Shore	10
Twin Cities Amazons	7
May 26 – Blaine, MN
Beantown	28
Colorado Old Girls	0
May 26 – Blaine, MN
Chicago	0
Bay Area Shehawks	14
May 26 – Blaine, MN
Florida State	40
New Orleans Half Moons	0

Semi-finals
May 26 – Blaine, MN
Belmont Shore	11
Beantown	10
May 26 – Blaine, MN
Shehawks	6
Florida State	0

Final
May 27 – Blaine, MN
Belmont Shore	12
Shehawks	3
Third place
May 27 – Blaine, MN
Beantown	21
Florida State	18

Semifinals

26 May 1990

Belmont Shore	11–10	Beantown
Try: Dawn Farwick; Michelle Hustwit; Pen: Kristi White		Try: Mary Sullivan c Jan Rutkowski; Con: Amy Westerman

Blaine, MN

26 May 1990

Shehawks	6–0	Florida State
Try: Cassie Law 62' c Con: Andi Morrell

Blaine, MN

Third place

27 May 1990

Beantown	21–18	Florida State
Try: Kelly Klavin; Jan Rutkowski; Penalty try 70'; Pen: Amy Westerman		Try: Patti Jervey; Karen Davis; Kathy Flores

Blaine, MN

=== Final ===
27 May 1990
3:00PM

Belmont Shore	12–3	Shehawks
Try: Kristi White; Kristi White c Con: Kristi White; Pen: Kristi White (2)		Pen: Andi Morrell 32'

Blaine, MN
Referee: Ed Sorenson

Champions: Belmont Shore
Staff: Cyndi Martinich (Coach), Wallace (Trainer)
Captain: Corrine Strege
Roster: Kris Thompson, Allenman, Barry, Bell, Boone, Breckenridge, Brown, Burrell, Hanawalt, Michelle Hustwit, Jamison, Katene, LaBelle, Marindin, Martin, Miller, Muhle, Nielsen, Rogers, Strano, Thompson, Walker, Kristi White.

== College ==
The 1990 College championship was won by Air Force for the second consecutive time with a win over Army. The College All–Star Championship was won by the East while Pacific was runner–up.

== Military ==
The 1990 Steinlager National Military Rugby Championship was a twenty–three team tournament in two divisions that took place at Fort Benning in Columbus, GA from May 5–6 and was won by Fayetteville Old Gray of Fort Bragg with a 10–6 win over Camp Lejeune in the Club Division while the President's XV won the Open Division defeating San Antonio 34–6 in the final. A 'plate division' was played by teams finishing third in their group and Fort Benning were the winners among them. Matt Runyon, scrumhalf of Fayetteville, was Most Valuable back, and Vince Brown, prop for Camp Lejeune, was Most Valuable forward.

Club Division

Standings					Scores		
Rank	Pool A	Pld	W	L	PEN	USU	FTH
1.	Pensacola	2	1	1	X	6:10	12:0
2.	USUHS	2	1	1	10:6	X	7:12
3.	Fort Hood	2	1	1	0:12	12:7	X

Standings					Scores		
Rank	Pool B	Pld	W	L	PEN	FTB	SEY
1.	Camp Pendleton	2	2	0	X	16:0	28:0
2.	Fort Benning	2	1	1	0:16	X	9:3
3.	Seymour Johnson	2	0	2	0:28	3:9	X

Standings					Scores		
Rank	Pool C	Pld	W	L	EGL	FTS	SCO
1.	Eglin	2	2	0	X	9:7	38:0
2.	Fort Sill	2	1	1	7:9	X	9:6
3.	Scott	2	0	2	0:38	6:9	X

Standings					Scores		
Rank	Pool D	Pld	W	L	FTB	WPA	PAN
1.	Fayetteville Old Gray	2	2	0	X	15:3	27:0
2.	Wright–Patterson AFB	2	1	1	3:15	X	22:0
3.	Panama	2	0	2	0:27	0:22	X

Standings					Scores		
Rank	Pool E	Pld	W	L	LEJ	D–M	BER
1.	Camp Lejeune	2	2	0	X	6:0	28:0
2.	Davis–Monthan	2	1	1	0:6	X	12:10
3.	Berlin	2	0	2	0:28	10:12	X

Standings					Scores		
Rank	Pool F	Pld	W	L	FTC	LEO	HAW
1.	Fort Campbell	2	2	0	X	9:3	6:3
2.	Leonard Wood	2	1	1	3:9	X	12:6
3.	Hawaii	2	0	2	3:6	6:12	X

Plate bracket

Quarter-finals
May 6 – Ft. Benning, GA
Fort Benning	14
Fort Hood	0
May 6 – Ft. Benning, GA
USUHS	10
Berlin	3
May 6 – Ft. Benning, GA
Leonard Wood	w/o
Seymour Johnson
May 6 – Ft. Benning, GA
Davis–Monthan	16
Hawaii	10

Semi-finals
May 6 – Ft. Benning, GA
Fort Benning	9
USUHS	6
May 6 – Ft. Benning, GA
Leonard Wood	0
Davis–Monthan	16

Final
May 6 – Ft. Benning, GA
Fort Benning	13
Davis–Monthan	12

Championship bracket

Quarter-finals
May 6 – Ft. Benning, GA
Fayetteville	16
Fort Campbell	6
May 6 – Ft. Benning, GA
Camp Pendleton	20
Fort Sill	12
May 6 – Ft. Benning, GA
Camp Lejeune	12
Pensacola	9
May 6 – Ft. Benning, GA
Eglin	13
Wright–Patterson	7

Semi-finals
May 6 – Ft. Benning, GA
Fayetteville	32
Camp Pendleton	0
May 6 – Ft. Benning, GA
Camp Lejeune	7
Eglin	0

Final
May 6 – Ft. Benning, GA
Fayetteville	10
Camp Lejeune	6

Final

6 May 1990

Fayetteville	10–6	Camp Lejeune
Try: 1 Pen: (2)		Pen: (2)

Ft. Benning, GA

Champions: Fayetteville Old Gray (Fort Bragg)
Coach: Marcus Michles
Roster: Will Schwenke, Matt Runyan, Danny Jayne, John Quigg, Tui Nua, Paul Sampson, Melvin Lonas, Rafael Lopez, Chris Tomlinson, Mark May, Darius Wawryk, James Roberson, Lew Boone, Jerry Nix, Mike Ryan, Brian Pierce, Alan Williams, Mike Thomas, Rick Randolph, Ike Eisenbarth, Bobby Storey, William Talfaeteau, Tom Chilton.

Open Division
Fort Carson 6–0 Quantico/Yuma
President's XV 25–0 Bragg OB
San Antonio 15–0 Fort Carson
Quantico/Yuma 0–17 President's XV
Bragg OB 6–19 San Antonio
Fort Carson 6–41 President's XV
Quantico/Yuma 0–24 San Antonio
Bragg OB 0–7 Fort Carson
President's XV 48–0 San Antonio
Quantico/Yuma 4–9 Bragg OB

Team		W	L	F	A
1	President's XV	4	0	121	6
2	San Antonio	3	1	58	54
3	Fort Carson	2	2	19	56
4	Bragg OB	1	3	15	55
5	Quantico/Yuma	0	4	4	56

=== Final ===
6 May 1990

President's XV	34–6	San Antonio

Fort Benning, GA

The 1990 Interservice Rugby Championship was held at the Mall in Washington D.C. from 7 to 9 September. The teams involved were select sides of each service branch. From these teams a selection was made to field the Combined Services Rugby team for tours.

Round Robin						Scores				
Rank	Standings	Pld	W	L	T	AIR	NAV	ARM	MAR	COA
1.	Air Force	4	3	1	0	X	9:6	18:3	3:9	12:6
2.	Navy	4	2	1	1	6:9	X	24:4	13:13	24:6
3.	Army	4	2	2	0	3:18	4:24	X	13:3	13:4
4.	Marines	4	1	2	1	9:3	13:13	3:13	X	6:10
5.	Coast Guard	4	1	3	0	6:12	6:24	4:13	10:6	X

Wooden Spoon
Coast Guard

Consolation
Army 24–3 Marines

Championship

9 September 1990
10:00AM

Air Force	22–9	Navy
Try: Penalty try 1H' c Ron Delanois 50' c Dan Miller; Dan Miller c Con: Mark Bissell		Try: Mark Pidcock c Con: Shay; Pen: Mark Pidcock 60'

Washington DC
Referee: Ted Serfass

Lineups:
Air Force– Dick Battock (Coach), Mark Knofczyznski, Rick Coveno, Ron Delanois, Kevin Swords (Captain), Mario Gonyea, Mike Hill, Dave Gaines, Dan Miller, Mike Graham, Steve Hajosy, Scott Pearl, Fred Gregory, Fitzgerald, Tom Collins, Mark Bissell.
Navy– Meteer (Coach), Speece, Simila, Taylor, McLaughlin, O'Brien, Lien, Shearn, Walker, Pidcock, Shay, Cinibaldi, Jameson, Long, McCue, Hurni.

== Sevens ==
=== Club ===
The 1990 National Club Seven–a–side championship, was played at Lee District Park in Alexandria, Virginia on 11 August. There were eight teams featured which included two representatives from each of the four territorial unions. Chicago Lions and Grand Rapids qualified from the Midwest. Maryland Old Boys and Northern Virginia qualified from the Eastern regional. Santa Monica and Old Puget Sound Beach represented the Pacific Coast. Denver Barbarians and New Mexico Brujos represented the West. Old Puget Sound Beach defeated Northern Virginia to win the championship. Duck Brothers finished third. Tony Ridnell of Old Puget Sound Beach was MVP.

Pool 1
First round

- Northern Virginia 18–8 Chicago Lions
- OPSB 29–0 New Mexico Brujos

Second round

- Northern Virginia 18–6 New Mexico Brujos
- OPSB 18–6 Chicago Lions

Third round

- OPSB 12–4 Northern Virginia
- Chicago Lions 22–18 New Mexico Brujos

Pool 2
First round

- Maryland Old Boys 28–0 Grand Rapids
- Santa Monica 12–6 Denver Barbarians

Second round

- Maryland Old Boys 26–0 Santa Monica
- Grand Rapids 14–10 Denver Barbarians

Third round

- Denver Barbarians 14–6 Maryland Old Boys
- Santa Monica 18–10 Grand Rapids

Semifinals

11 August 1990

Old Puget Sound Beach	16–0	Santa Monica

Alexandria, VA
Referee: Jim Jeffers

11 August 1990

Northern Virginia	18–12	Maryland Old Boys
Try: Charlie Wilkinson c Chris Andres c Chris Andres c Con: Chris Andres (2); Charlie Wilkinson		Try: Will Brewington c Andy Truesdale c Con: John Redmond

Alexandria, VA
Referee: Ed Sorenson

Third place

11 August 1990

Santa Monica	3–0	Maryland Old Boys
	MOB forfeit

Alexandria, VA

==== Final ====
11 August 1990

Old Puget Sound Beach	18–10	Northern Virginia
Try: Dave Bateman 4' c Finau Puloka c Jim Burgett c Con: Mike Telkamp		Try: Chris Andres 2' c Dixie Dean; Con: Chris Andres

Alexandria, VA
Attendance: 1000
Referee: Mark Binning

Champions: Old Puget Sound Beach
Roster: David Bateman, Jon Knutson, Ty Adams, Mike Telkamp, Tony Ridnell, George Foster, Steve Nieman, Finau Puloka, Al Robertson, Jim Burgett.

=== All Star ===
The 1990 National All-Star Sevens Rugby Tournament was an eight team tournament with two representatives from each territory. Similar to the ITTs, the other purpose of the tournament was to select members for the U.S. Eagles Seven–a–side team. This years tournament took place at Lee District Park in Alexandria, VA on 12 August. The Pacific I team won the final 28–16 over the East II team. East I came in third.

Group A 1
First round

- East I 22–0 West II
- Midwest I 24–0 Pacific II

Second round

- East I 28–0 Pacific II
- West II 18–0 Midwest I

Third round

- Midwest I 24–10 East I
- Pacific II 14–6 West II

Group B
First round

- Pacific I 20–14 Midwest II
- East II 30–4 West I

Second round

- East II 20–6 Pacific I
- Midwest II 18–10 West I

Third round

- Pacific I 14–13 West I
- East II 28–0 Midwest II

Consolation

- West I 14–12 Pacific II
- West II 22–6 Midwest II

Seventh place

- Midwest II W–L Pacific II (forfeit)

Fifth place

- West I T–T West II

Semifinals

12 August 1990

Pacific I	24–6	Midwest I
Try: Chris O'Brien (2) c Kevin Higgins c Eric Whitaker c Con: Tom Smith (4)		Try: Jason Fox c Con: Thor Bolstad

Alexandria, VA

12 August 1990

East II	22–4	East I
Try: J.R. Vendetto (2); Brian Driscoll; Steve Siano; Con: John Redmond (3)		Try: Greg Goodyear

Alexandria, VA

Consolation

27 August 1989

Midwest I	18–10	Pacific II

Alexandria, VA

==== Final ====
12 August 1990

Pacific I	28–16	East II
Try: Bill Leversee 2' c Eric Whitaker c Eric Whitaker c Eric Whitaker 15'; Jim Burgett c Con: Tom Smith (4)		Try: Terrence Titus; Brian Driscoll c Terrence Titus c Con: John Redmond (2)

Alexandria, VA
Referee: Fred Howard (England)

Champions: Pacific Coast Grizzlies I
Staff: Dick Smith (Manager), R. Smith (Trainer)
Captain: Tom Smith (Old Blues)–Player/Coach
Roster: Bill Leversee (OMBAC)–Prop, Jim Burgett (OPSB)–Flyhalf/Hooker, Brian Vizard (OMBAC)–Prop, Chris O'Brien (Old Blues)–Flyhalf, Kevin Higgins (OMBAC)–Wing/Center, Eric Whiaker (Old Blues)–Center/Wing, Russell Ortiz (Santa Monica)–Prop.

== ITT ==
The Inter Territorial Tournament involved the four regional rugby unions comprising the United States RFU: Pacific Coast RFU, Western RFU, Midwest RFU, and the Eastern Rugby Union. The region teams are formed with players selected from the sub regional rugby unions. Subsequently, the USA Eagles are selected from the four regional teams after the ITT concludes. In 1990 the tournament took place at Park City, UT from May 28–30. The Eastern Colonials won the tournament for the fourth time.

Results:

26 May 1990
10:30AM

Midwest	3–23	East
Pen: Dave Horton 31'		Try: Tom McCormack 25' c Allen Spriggs 67' c Dave Robertson 76', 78'; Con: Allen Spriggs; Drop: John Lockwood 36'

Park City, UT
Referee: Dave Head

26 May 1990
1:00PM

Pacific Coast	35–14	West
Try: Eric Whitaker 2' c Jon Finstuen 24' c Dean Klisura c Barry Daily 65'; Barry Daily; Con: Chris O'Brien; Pen: Chris O'Brien 16', 2H', 70'		Try: Mike Glass 36'; Mike Thompson; Greg Goodman c Con: Mike DeJong

Park City, UT
Referee: Kieran Geoghegan

27 May 1990
10:30AM

West	27–24	Midwest
Try: Russ Isaac 64' c Mike Glass 75' c Norbert Mueller 80+' c Con: Mike DeJong; Pen: Mike DeJong 68'; Drop: Mike DeJong 43', 71'		Try: Mark Sawicki 13' c Kevin Behm 39' c Con: Dave Horton; Pen: Dave Horton 11', 18'; Matt Pickston 37'; Drop: Dave Horton 24'

Park City, UT
Referee: Mark Binning

27 May 1990
1:30PM

Pacific Coast	18–19	East
Try: Barry Tofaeono 53' c Barry Tofaeono c Con: Chris O'Brien; Pen: Chris O'Brien 1H', 45'		Try: Ed Simpson 6'; Joe Burke 26' c Con: Glenn Judge; Pen: Glenn Judge 13', 17', 63'

Park City, UT
Referee: Don Reordan

28 May 1990
10:30AM

East	21–15	West
Try: Tom Brewer 5' c Rory Lewis 55' c Con: Glenn Judge; Pen: Glenn Judge 9', 20', 33'		Try: Scott Bertrand 76' c Con: Mike DeJong; Pen: Mike DeJong 42', 2H', 2H'

Park City, UT
Referee: Kieran Geoghegan

28 May 1990
1:00PM

Pacific Coast	12–26	Midwest
Try: Brian Walgenbach 76' c Con: Chris O'Brien; Pen: Chris O'Brien 22', 35'		Try: Kevin Behm 65'; John Apke 72' c Rich Schurfeld; Pen: Matt Pickston (3); Drop: David Horton 61'

Park City, UT
Referee: Jim Russell

Team		W	L	F	A
1	Eastern Colonials	3	0	63	36
2	Pacific Coast Grizzlies	1	2	65	59
3	Midwest Thunderbirds	1	2	53	62
4	Western Mustangs	1	2	56	80

Champions: Eastern Colonials
Staff: Mr. Smith (Manager), Little (Coach)
Roster: Don Anderson-Prop (Life), Tom Brewer-#8 (Union), Steve Brown-Hooker (Old White), Joe Burke-Center (Albany Knights), Steve Burnham-Wing (Maryland Old Boys), Bob Clark-#8 (Boston), Jim Duffy-Lock (Washington), Rob Farley-Flanker (Philadelphia Whitemarsh), Mike Frenzel-Lock (Atlanta Renegades), Mark Gaetjen-Wing (Washington), Steve Gootkind-Prop (Life), Butch Horwath-Prop (Philadelphia Whitemarsh), Glenn Judge-Flyhalf (Hartford), Jim Keller-Lock (NYAC), Jim King-Flanker (Old Blue), Rory Lewis-Wing (Washington), John Lockwood-Center (Boston), Marcus Maffei-Center (Philadelphia Whitemarsh), Lance Manga-Prop (South Jersey), Rory Mather-Scrumhalf (Boston), Tom McCormack-Hooker (Chesapeake), Alec Montgomery-Fullback (Mystic River), Dave Robertson-Wing (Mystic River), Paul Sheehy-Fullback (Washington), Mike Siano-Flanker (Philadelphia Whitemarsh), Ed Simpson-Flanker (Old Blue), Allen Spriggs-Scrumhalf (Boca Raton), Tom Sullivan–Center (Washington), Kevin Swords–Lock (Beacon Hill).

Junior ITT
The 1990 Junior ITT tournament took place at Park City, UT from May 26–28. The West and Midwest tied for first.

26 May 1990
9:00AM

Midwest	43–6	East
Try: Tony Crow c Dave Van Remortal c Larry Zeno c Tony Crow c Chris Botson; Thor Bolstad; Rich Matiszik; Con: Thor Bolstad (6/7); Pen: Thor Bolstad		Try: David Snodgrass 65' c Con: Chris Lyles

Park City, UT

26 May 1990
1:00PM

Pacific Coast	12–9	West
Pen: Mike Brewin (4)		Try: Shawn Loudenback c Con: Mel Brooke; Pen: Mel Brooke

Park City, UT

27 May 1990
9:00AM

West	34–9	Midwest
Try: David James; Tom Dujakovich; Gregg Jarvis; Mel Brooke; Con: Thor Bolstad (3/4); Pen: Mel Brooke (4)		Pen: Kirt Beers (3)

Park City, UT

27 May 1990
1:30PM

East	28–6	Pacific Coast
Try: Bob Yale; Rich Brown c Ed Stump c Brit Howard; Rob Hollinger; Bob Yale; Con: Tim Seymour		Pen: Simon Matthews 1H', 2H'

Park City, UT
Referee: Jim Russell

28 May 1990
9:00AM

East	10–27	West
Try: Casey McKee c Tim Seymour; Con: Tim Seymour		Try: David James (2); Pen: Mel Brooke (5)

Park City, UT

28 May 1990
9:00AM

Midwest	14–13	Pacific Coast
Try: Mike Curtis c Mark Paca (2); Con: Tim Seymour		Try: Brett McDonald; Henz c Con: Mike Brewin; Pen: Mike Brewin

Park City, UT

Women's ITT
The fourth edition of the Women's ITT was played from January 27–28 in Long Beach, CA. The tournament was won by the East with Pacific in second and West was third.

Round one:

- East 34–0 West
- Pacific Coast 29–4 Midwest

Round two:

- Midwest 14–4 West
- East 11–10 Pacific Coast

Round three:

- East 4–3 Midwest
- Pacific Coast 16–0 West

== High School ==
The 1990 National High School Rugby Championship was an eight team tournament that took place 19 May at the Retama Polo Center in San Antonio, TX. The Highland squad from Utah won the championship by defeating Alamo City in the final. Doylestown of Pennsylvania took third.

Quarter-finals
May 19 – San Antonio, TX
Highland (Salt Lake)	28
North Bend (Cincinnati)	0
May 19 – San Antonio, TX
Liberty (Issaquah)	W
West End (Fairfax)	L
May 19 – San Antonio, TX
Alamo City (San Antonio)	7
El Camino (Sacramento)	0
May 19 – San Antonio, TX
Doylestown (Pennsylvania)	16
Douglas County (Denver)	4

Semi-finals
May 19 – San Antonio, TX
Highland	32
Liberty	6
May 19 – San Antonio, TX
Alamo City	24
Doylestown	4

Final
May 19 – San Antonio, TX
Highland	31
Alamo City	0
Third place
May 19 – San Antonio, TX
Doylestown	12
Liberty	4

Consolation
El Camino 12–6 Douglas County
West End W–L North Bend

Seventh place

- Douglas County 9–0 North Bend

Fifth place

- El Camino 20–4 West End

=== Final ===
20 May 1990

Highland	31–0	Alamo City
Try: James Adamson 1' c Kailahi 8'; Ellis 12'; David Parkin; James Adamson 52' c Ryan Steele; Pen: 50'

San Antonio, TX
Referee: Joel Deimer (WRFU)
