= 1981 National Rugby Championships =

Series of tournaments

Tournament details
- Tournament format(s): Various
- Date: 1981

Tournament statistics

Final

The 1981 National Rugby Championships were a series of tournaments organized to determine a national champion in several divisions for United States rugby teams. The divisions included Men's/Women's Club, college, high school, Military, Sevens, and Interterritorial.

== Men's Club ==
The 1981 National Club Rugby Championship was sponsored by Michelob and took place in Dayton, Ohio at Wright-Patterson Air Force Base from May 9–10. The teams featured in the tournament were the champions of the four sub unions of USARFU. Coached by Ron Mayes the Berkeley Old Blues won the title defeating Old Blues of New York in the final 9–3. Old Blues scrumhalf David Bateman was MVP back and Old Blues flanker Whit Everett was MVP forward.

Regional Semifinal
April 25 - San Francisco, CA
Old Blues	26
Old Puget Sound	3
April 25 - San Francisco, CA
BATS	17
Santa Monica	16
April 19 - Las Cruces, NM
Denver Barbarians	18
Dallas Harlequins	0
April 19 - Las Cruces, NM
Kansas City Blues	49
Oklahoma	7
April 25 - Washington D.C.
Old Blue	15
Atlanta Renegades	0
April 25 - Washington D.C.
Norfolk Blues	19
Bethlehem Hooligans	7
April 26 - Milwaukee, WI
Minneapolis	7
Chicago Lions	4
April 26 - Milwaukee, WI
Evansville All–Whites	W
Louisville	L

Regional Final
April 26 - San Francisco, CA
Old Blues (CA)	26
BATS	3
April 26 - Denver, CO
Denver Barbarians	10
Kansas City Blues	7
April 26 - Washington D.C.
Old Blue (NY)	17
Norfolk Blues	13
April 26 - Milwaukee, WI
Minneapolis	13
Evansville All–Whites	7

National Semifinal
May 9 – Dayton, OH
Old Blues (CA)	17
Denver Barbarians	3
May 9 – Dayton, OH
Old Blue (NY)	23
Minneapolis	8

National Final
May 10 – Dayton, OH
Old Blues (CA)	9
Old Blue (NY)	3
Third place
May 10 – Dayton, OH
Denver	6
Minneapolis	3

=== Semifinals ===
09 May 1981

Old Blues (CA)	17–3	Denver Barbarians
Try: Blane Warhurst c Mark Richter; Mark Richter; Con: Bill Armstrong (1/3); Pen: Bill Armstrong		Pen: 60' Milt Bennett

Dayton, OH
Referee: Peter Jones

09 May 1981

Old Blue (NY)	23–8	Minneapolis
Try: Mike Sherlock 14'; Malcolm Kimble; Chimere Okezie 45' c Chimere Okezie 67' c Con: Malcolm Kimble (2/4); Pen: Malcolm Kimble 21'		Try: Connors 75'; Johnson 77'

Dayton, OH

=== Third place ===
10 May 1981

Denver Barbarians	6–3	Minneapolis

Dayton, OH

=== Final ===
10 May 1981
12:30 PM

Old Blues (CA)	9–3	Old Blue (NY)
Pen: Bill Armstrong 5', 20', 76'		Pen: Malcolm Kimble 3'

Dayton, OH
Referee: Ian Nixon (Texas)

Champions: Old Blues RFC of Berkeley, CA
Coach: Ron Mayes
Captain: Jeff Hollings (Hooker)
Roster: Dale Allan (Lock), Bill Armstrong (Center), Rick Bailey (Prop), Dave Bateman (Scrumhalf), Jim Brazil (Prop), Gary Bunce (Wing), John Dixon (Fullback), Duke Eberle (#8), Lee Evans (Center), John Everett (Hooker), Whit Everett (Flanker), Roy Helu (Center), Jay Heron (Flanker), Charlie Hextrum (Lock), Jeff Hollings (Hooker), Dean Landry (Prop), Jeff Lucas (Flyhalf), Bo Myersiek (Flyhalf), Steve Ponder (#8), Marty Richter (Wing), Steve Teasdale (Scrumhalf), Dennis Ward (Fullback), Blane Warhurst (Flanker), Jeff Westcolt (Wing), Brad Williams (Lock).

== Women's Club ==
The 1981 Women's National Rugby Championship was a 16 team tournament sponsored by Michelob that took place on May 23–25 in Oak Brook, IL. The Belmont Shores team of Long Beach, CA won the championship with a 7–6 win over Beantown of Boston, MA. Kathy Cantu of Belmont Shore was MVP and Karen Onufry of Beantown won the Game Breaker Award.

Round of 16
May 23 – Oakbrook, IL
Belmont Shore	32
Ohio State	6
May 23 – Oakbrook, IL
Florida State
May 23 – Oakbrook, IL
Wisconsin Madison
May 23 – Oakbrook, IL
May 23 – Oakbrook, IL
Beantown	8
San Francisco	6
May 23 – Oakbrook, IL
U of Colorado
May 23 – Oakbrook, IL
Chicago
May 23 – Oakbrook, IL

Quarterfinal
May 23 – Oakbrook, IL
Belmont Shore	4
Florida State	0
May 23 – Oakbrook, IL
Wisconsin Madison
May 23 – Oakbrook, IL
Beantown	32
U of Colorado	0
May 23 – Oakbrook, IL
Chicago

National Semifinal
May 24 – Oakbrook, IL
Belmont Shore	13
Wisconsin Madison	8
May 24 – Oakbrook, IL
Beantown	15
Chicago	4

National Final
May 24 – Oakbrook, IL
Belmont Shore	7
Beantown	6
Third place
May 24 – Oakbrook, IL
Denver	6
Minneapolis	3

=== Final ===
25 May 1981

Belmont Shore	7–6	Beantown
Try: Gail Ball 72'; Pen: Kathy Cantu 10'		Try: Nancy Breen c Con: Karen Onufry

Oakbrook, IL
Referee: Jay Rusek

Lineups:
Belmont Shore– Dave Head (Coach), Stregge (Prop), Hankins (Hooker), Hancock (Prop), Boyce (Lock), Hartman (Lock), Rogers (#8), Kathy Cantu–captain (Flanker), Miller (Flanker), Wallace (Scrumhalf), Cindy Martinich (Flyhalf), Jill Goldberg (Center), Gail Ball (Center), Kuskey (Wing), Martin (Wing), Melissa Hart (Fullback).
Beantown– Moynihan (Prop), Mullins (Hooker), Kimble (Prop), Kaspotys (Lock), Rutkowski (Lock), Locket (#8), Bridi (Flanker), Mindy Fener (Flanker), Cepko (Scrumhalf), Karen Onufry (Flyhalf), Evans (Center), Lewis (Center), Keith (Wing), Marr (Wing), Nancy Breen (Fullback).

== College ==
The 1981 College championship was won by University of California at Berkeley. Harvard was runner-up.

== Military ==
The 1981 Military Club Rugby Championship took place in Dayton, Ohio at Wright-Patterson Air Force Base from May 9–10 and was won by the Wright Patterson Jets with a 7–3 win over Camp Pendleton.

Quarter-finals
May 9 - Dayton, OH
Wright Patterson	6
Fort Campbell	0
May 9 - Dayton, OH
Fort Bragg	26
193rd Infantry(Panama)	6
May 9 - Dayton, OH
Camp Pendleton	W
Uniformed Services Medical School	L
May 9 - Dayton, OH
Davis Monthan	12
Scott AFB/EUCOM	10

Semi-finals
May 9 - Dayton, OH
Wright Patterson	3
Fort Bragg	0
May 9 - Dayton, OH
Camp Pendleton	7
Davis Monthan	6

Final
May 10 - Dayton, OH
Wright Patterson	7
Camp Pendleton	3
Third place
May 10 - Dayton, OH

=== Final ===
10 May 1981

Wright Patterson	7–3	Camp Pendleton
Try: Gary Troop 20'; Drop: Randy Troop		Pen: Tukufu

Dayton, OH
Referee: Roger Mazarella (Midwest RFU)

== Sevens ==
The 1981 National Sevens Rugby Tournament was hosted by the Hartford Wanderers and took place on June 20, 1981, at Sterling Field in West Hartford, Connecticut. The tournament was won by the Hartford Wanderers for the first time.

- West Hartford Wanderers 30-16 University of Rhode Island alumni (Final)

== ITT ==
The Inter Territorial Tournament involved the four regional rugby unions comprising the United States RFU: Pacific Coast RFU, Western RFU, Midwest RFU, and the Eastern Rugby Union. The region teams are formed from selected players from the sub regional rugby unions. Subsequently, the USA Eagles are selected from the four regional teams after the ITT concludes. The 1981 edition was played at the Oak Brook Sports Core in Oak Brook, Illinois from May 23–25. The Pacific Coast RFU repeated as tournament champions. Flyhalf Steve Morris of the West was MVP back and flanker Gary Lambert of the East was MVP forward.
Results:

23 May 1981
1:00PM

Pacific Coast	11–10	Eastern
Try: Don Guest 47'; Don Guest; Pen: Tom Smith 62'		Try: Lin Walton 4' c Harry Dickens 39'; Con: ?

Oakbrook, IL
Referee: Chuck Erhardt

23 May 1981
3:00PM

Midwest	29–9	Western
Try: Bob Vaughn c Joe Scheitlin c Keith Smith c Dan Johnson; Steve Gramling; Con: Joe Scheitlin; Pen: Joe Scheitlin 32'		Try: Kelly Miller c Con: Steve Morris; Pen: Steve Morris

Oakbrook, IL
Referee: Don Reordan

24 May 1981
1:00PM

Pacific Coast	29–7	Western
Try: Tom Smith; Dave Carpenter 50'; Tim O'Brien 62' c Dennis Shanagher 64'; Winn Vanderspeck c Con: Tom Smith; Pen: Tom Smith		Try: Jim Cook; Pen: Rock Naunheim 12'

Oakbrook, IL
Attendance: 1500
Referee: Ian Nixon

24 May 1981
3:00PM

Midwest	9–25	Eastern
Pen: Bill Chung 6', 31'; Joe Scheitlin		Try: Gary Lambert c Otis Purvis 53' c Gary Lambert 70'; Con: Mike Dufrense; Pen: Dick Cooke (2); Drop: Dick Cooke

Oakbrook, IL
Referee: Denis Shanagher

25 May 1981
11:00AM

Midwest	6–31	Pacific Coast
Pen: Joe Scheitlin 6', 84'		Try: Dave Bateman 2'; Steve Gray c Helu; John Fowler; Steve Gray; Whit Everett; Con: Tom Smith; Pen: Tom Smith

Oakbrook, IL
Referee: Ian Nixon

25 May 1981
1:00PM

Western	4–35	Eastern
Try: Steve Morris		Try: Jim Demyan 30'; Lin Walton 31'; Lin Walton 45'; Larry Menyhart; Gary Lloyd 60'; Lin Walton 77'; Harry Dickens 78'; Con: Dick Cooke; Pen: Dick Cooke

Oakbrook, IL
Referee: Don Reordan

Team		W	L	F	A
1	Pacific Coast Grizzlies	3	0	71	23
2	Eastern Colonials	2	1	70	24
3	Midwest Thunderbirds	1	2	44	65
4	Western Mustangs	0	3	20	89

Champions: Pacific Coast Grizzlies
Coaches: Ron Mayes, Rod Sears
Manager: Dan Hickey
Roster: Bill Armstrong–Wing (Old Blues), Rick Bailey-Prop (Old Blues), Dave Bateman–Scrumhalf (Old Blues), Jim Brazil-Prop (Old Blues), Ed Burlingham–Lock (Irvine Coast), Dave Carpenter-Flanker (Old Puget Sound), John Carroll-Lock (Santa Monica), Bill Ekern-Flanker (Davis City), Whit Everett–Flanker/#8 (Old Blues), John Fowler–Flanker/#8 (UCLA), Jamie Grant–Hooker (Santa Monica), Steve Gray–Flyhalf (Los Angeles), Don Guest–Wing (BATS), Ian Gunn–Flyhalf (Old Puget Sound), Jay Hanson-Hooker (San Francisco), Roy Helu–Center (Old Blues), Chuck Hextrum–Lock (Old Blues), John Jelaco–Prop (BATS), Skip Niebauer-Flanker (BATS), Tim O'Brien-Center (UC Berkeley), Mike Purcell–Wing (BATS), Dennis Shanagher-Center (BATS), Tom Smith-Flyhalf/Fullback (UCLA), Winn Vanderspek-Scrumhalf (Old Puget Sound), Scott Williams-Fullback (Old Puget Sound).

== High School ==
The 1981 National High School Rugby Championship took place in Dayton, Ohio at Wright-Patterson Air Force Base from May 9–10. Redwood High of Larkspur, CA became the first champions after a 6–3 victory over Seneca Valley of Maryland.

- First round: Seneca Valley W-L Cincinnati Indian Hills

Quarter-finals
May 9 – Dayton, OH
Redwood	13
Cincinnati Elder	0
May 9 – Dayton, OH
Langley	W
Centerville B	L
May 9 – Dayton, OH
Seneca Valley	W
Cincinnati St. Xavier	L
May 9 – Dayton, OH
Webster Grove	W
Centerville A	L

Semi-finals
May 9 – Dayton, OH
Redwood	11
Langley	9
May 9 – Dayton, OH
Seneca Valley	22
Webster Grove	0

Final
May 10 – Dayton, OH
Redwood	6
Seneca Valley	3
Third place
May 10 – Dayton, OH
Langley
Webster Grove

Champions: Redwood High
Coach: David Kirschoff
Roster: Colin Cole, Brian Muller, John Flowers, Jeff Davis, Elliot Morshead, Steve Fentress, Benny Thio, Mitch Halston, Barry Grove, Greg Merriman, Greg Behrendt, Robert Salaber, Robert Forstner, Nick Stoll, Duncan Green, Phil Aufricht, Eric Goodfield, Mike Jackson, Bud Riley, Steve Havernass, Sean Silvera, Pat Farley, John Weisberg, Mike King, David Flowers.
