= 1984 National Collegiate Rugby Championship =

Tournament details
- Tournament format(s): Knockout
- Date: May 5 – 6, 1984

Tournament statistics
- Teams: 4
- Matches played: 4
- Tries scored: 11 (2.75 per match)
- Top point scorer(s): John Catliff
- Top try scorer(s): Alex Agre

Final
- Venue: Pebble Beach, CA
- Champions: Harvard (1st title)
- Runners-up: Colorado

The 1984 National Collegiate Rugby Championship was the fifth edition of the official national championship for intercollegiate rugby. The tournament, sponsored by Michelob, took place concurrently with the 26th Monterey National Invitational Rugby Tournament in Pebble Beach, California. Harvard won their first title with a victory over Colorado. John Catliff of Harvard took second place in the Running Drop Kick championship.

== Venue ==
California
Collins Polo Field	1984 National Collegiate Rugby Championship is located in California
Pebble Beach, California	1984 National Collegiate Rugby Championship is located in California
Capacity:	1984 National Collegiate Rugby Championship is located in California

== Participants ==
Harvard
Qualified for the National Championship by advancing from the Eastern Championship at Conshohocken, PA on April 28–29.

- Harvard 39-3 Florida State
- Harvard 9-3 Virginia Polytechnic Institute

Roster:
President – Charles Weeks
Coach – Martyn Kingston
Co-captains - John Beilenson, Kevin Lennon

Miami
Qualified for the National Championship by winning the Midwest Collegiate Championship at Ball State in Muncie, Indiana on April 28–29.

- Miami 11-7 Bowling Green
- Miami 32-6 Wisconsin Stevens Point

Roster: Coach- Doug Edwards
Captain-
Record-

Colorado
Qualified for the National Championship by winning the Western Regional in Boulder, Colorado on April 21–22.

- Colorado 24-5 Air Force

Roster:
Manager- Jertovec
Coach- Jim Dunckley
Captain- Steve Williams
Record-

Long Beach
Qualified from Pacific Coast Collegiate Regional at Long Beach, CA on April 26–28.

- Long Beach 27-9 Oregon State
- Long Beach 12-9 California

Roster:
Coach- Dr. Dale Toohey
Captain- Geoff Stein
Record 33-3

== Bracket ==
Regional Semifinal
April 28 - Conshohocken, PA
Harvard	39
Florida State	3
April 28 - Conshohocken, PA
VPI	10
Maryland	7
April 27 - Long Beach, CA
Long Beach	31
Oregon State	9
April 27 - Long Beach, CA
BYU	10
California	15
April 22 - Boulder, CO
Colorado	7
Kansas State	0
April 22 - Boulder, CO
New Mexico State	4
Air Force	7
April 28 - Muncie, IN
Miami	11
Bowling Green	7
April 28 - Muncie, IN
UW Stevens Point	18
Ball State	17

Regional Final
April 29 - Conshohocken, PA
Harvard	9
VPI	3
April 28 - Long Beach, CA
Long Beach	12
California	9
April 22 - Boulder, CO
Colorado	24
Air Force	5
April 29 - Muncie, IN
Miami	32
UW Stevens Point	6

National Semifinal
May 5 – Pebble Beach, CA
Harvard (East)	15
Long Beach (Pacific)	11
May 5 – Pebble Beach, CA
Colorado (West)	18
Miami (Midwest)	0

National Final
May 6 – Pebble Beach, CA
Harvard	12
Colorado	4
Third place
May 6 – Pebble Beach, CA
Long Beach	9
Miami	6

== Semifinals ==
5 May 1984
12:10 PM

Harvard
Try: George Askew 34' c
Con: John Catliff (1/1)
Pen:
- John Catliff 12'
- John Catliff 65'
Drop: John Catliff 46'
15–11

Long Beach
Try:
- 20' Marty Lewis
- 54' Greg Thornton
Con: (0/2)
Pen: Dai Morgan

Pebble Beach, CA
Referee: Ian Nixon (USARFU)

5 May 1984
1:45 PM

Colorado
Try:
- 20' Alex Agre c
- 52' Alex Agre c
- 71'Colin Forrest c
Con: Colin Forrest(3/3)
18–0

Miami

Pebble Beach, CA
Referee: Dave Head

== Third place ==
6 May 1984
9:40 AM

Long Beach	9–6	Miami
Try: Jay Ross 75' c Con: Geoff Stein (1/1); Pen: 85' Geoff Stein		Try: 35' Steve Williams c Con: Fran Wilamosky (1/1)

Pebble Beach, CA
Referee: Dave Head

== Final ==
6 May 1984
12:30 PM

Harvard
Try:
- Kevin Lennon 14' c
- John Beilenson 66' c
Con: John Catliff (2/2)
12–4

Colorado
Try: 59' Alex Agre
Con: (0/1)

Pebble Beach, CA
Attendance: 3000
Referee: Don Morrison (USARFU)

Harvard: 1 Hassan Rifaat, 2 Bill Cavanaugh, 3 Fran Duggan, 4 Dave Heffernan, 5 Bob Zizka, 6 Mark Bamford, 7 Jon Kennedy, 8 Kevin Lennon, 9 Bobby Hackett, 10 John Catliff, 11 John Cammett, 12 John Beilenson, 13 Gus Spanos, 14 George Askew, 15 Charlie Montgomery.
Colorado: 1 Dave Drach, 2 Doń Edrington, 3 Rich Winkler, 4 Mark Adolfson, 5 Kevin Doran, 6 Holger Forrest, 7 Jay Landt, 8 Scott Bergquist, 9 Steve Ernst, 10 Ken Ferguson, 11 Colin Forrest, 12 Jim Ritchie, 13 Brian Price, 14 Alex Agre, 15 Russ Clark.

== See also ==
1984 National Rugby Championships
