= 1984 National Rugby Championships =

Series of tournaments

Tournament details
- Tournament format(s): Various
- Date: 1984

Tournament statistics

Final

The 1984 National Rugby Championships were a series of tournaments organized to determine a national champion in several divisions for United States rugby teams. The divisions included Men's/Women's Club, college, high school, Military, Sevens, and Interterritorial.

== Men's Club ==
The 1984 National Club Rugby Championship was sponsored by Michelob and took place in Hartford, CT at Dillon Stadium from May 12–13. The teams featured in the tournament were the champions of the four sub unions of USARFU. Last years runners up, the Dallas Harlequins won the title. For the first time the championship game was broadcast on ESPN.

Territorial Semifinal
April 15 - Dallas, TX
Dallas Reds	9
Dallas Harlequins	58
April 15 - Kansas City, MO
Black Sheep	6
Univ. of Oklahoma	15
April 28 - Cincinnati, OH
Cincinnati Wolfhounds	0
Chicago Lions	3
April 28 - Cincinnati, OH
Pittsburgh	3
Milwaukee	6
April 28 - San Francisco, CA
Old Blues	4
Belmont Shore	12
April 28 - San Francisco, CA
Portland	9
Los Angeles	25
April 28 - Conshohocken, PA
Boston	46
Atlanta Renegades	6
April 28 - Conshohocken, PA
Blackthorn	20
Charlotte	16

Territorial Final
April 28 - Dallas, TX
Dallas Harlequins	59
Univ. of Oklahoma	10
April 29 - Cincinnati, OH
Chicago Lions	7
Milwaukee	3
April 29 - San Francisco, CA
Belmont Shore	4
Los Angeles	26
April 29 - Conshohocken, PA
Boston	9
Blackthorn	12

National Semifinal
May 12 – Hartford, CT
Dallas Harlequins	16
Chicago Lions	3
May 12 – Hartford, CT
Los Angeles	23
Blackthorn	4

National Final
May 13 – Hartford, CT
Dallas Harlequins	31
Los Angeles	12
Third place
May 13 – Hartford, CT
Chicago Lions	13
Blackthorn	10

=== Semifinals ===
12 May 1984
1:00 PM

Dallas Harlequins	16–3	Chicago Lions
Try: Bob Saunders 10'; Mike Carey 53' c Con: Naas Botha 1/2; Pen: Naas Botha 56'; Drop: Naas Botha 69'		Pen: Roger Castino 66'

Dillon Stadium
Referee: Kierin Geoghegan (ERU)

12 May 1984
3:00 PM

Los Angeles	23–4	Philadelphia Blackthorn
Try: Rob Pigott 17'; Mike Carey 32' c Mike Carey 45'; John Mickel 68' c Con: Ray Nelson 2/4; Pen: Ray Nelson 77'		Try: Pete Brindle 83'

Dillon Stadium
Referee: Ian Nixon (USARFU)

=== Third place ===
13 May 1984
1:00 PM

Chicago Lions	13–10	Blackthorn
Try: Tony Grant 38'; Mike Maddock 75' c Con: Roger Castino 1/2; Pen: Roger Castino 3'		Try: Perry Cummings 12' c Marc McKenna; Con: Dave Ralph

Dillon Stadium
Referee: Jim Russell (USARFU)

=== Final ===
13 May 1984
3:00 PM

Dallas Harlequins	31–12	Los Angeles
Try: Mike Carey 44'; Alan James 62' c David Cronje 81' c Con: Naas Botha 2/3; Pen: Naas Botha 58'; Naas Botha 69'; Drop: Naas Botha 7'; Naas Botha 67'; Naas Botha 74'		Try: Hofoka Lanu 39' c Con: Ray Nelson; Pen: Ray Nelson; Drop: Ray Nelson 47'

Dillon Stadium
Referee: Ian Nixon (USARFU)

Dallas Harlequins: 1 Taylor, 2 Lankin, 3 Aneskievich, 4 Olsonski, 5 Dippie, 6 Lutterbach, 7 James, 8 Van Biljon, 9 Cronje(C), 10 Botha, 11 Gehur, 12 Spriggs, 13 Saunders, 14 Carey, 15 Aston.
Los Angeles: 1 Gonsalves, 2 Lanu, 3 Jellico, 4 Scanlin (Pigott 69'), 5 Teuhema, 6 McClain, 7 Surdyka, 8 Carey, 9 Mickel, 10 Philip, 11 Williams (Hackett 72'), 12 McNaughton, 13 Corcoran(C), 14 Trudeau, 15 Nelson.

== Women's Club ==
The 1984 Women's National Rugby Championship was a tournament that took place at the Polo Grounds on May 27–28 in Oak Brook, IL. Florida State reversed the previous year's result and defeated Beantown of Boston, MA 11–6 to win the title. Iowa State took third place with a 14–6 win over UC Berkeley. Candi Orsini of Florida State was named tournament MVP.

Quarter-finals
May 27 - Oak Brook, IL
Florida State	24
New Orleans	3
May 27 - Oak Brook, IL
Iowa State	16
Stanford	4
May 27 - Oak Brook, IL
Beantown	34
Texas A&M	0
May 27 - Oak Brook, IL
Cal Berkeley
Chicago

Semi-finals
May 27 – Oak Brook, IL
Florida State	16
Iowa State	0
May 27 – Oak Brook, IL
Beantown	26
Cal Berkeley	3

Final
May 28 – Oak Brook, IL
Florida State	11
Beantown	6
Third place
May 28 – Oak Brook, IL
Iowa State	14
Cal Berkeley	6

=== Final ===
28 May 1984

Florida State	11–6	Beantown
Try: Kathy Kojm 56'; Candi Orsini 79'; Con: Vicki Bowlin 0/2; Pen: Vicki Bowlin 11'		Try: Kerri Heffernan 22' c Con: Margie McClure 1/1

Oakbrook, IL
Referee: Peter Jones (ERU)

Florida State: 1 Frances Gilbert, 2 Pat Kossman, 3 Sheila Hill, 4 Kathy Kojm, 5 Coller Fahey, 6 Jackie Bonaker, 7 Karin Morton, 8 Kathy Flores, 9 Mary Holmes, 10 Connie Jakubcin, 11 Carolyn Alley, 12 Suzi Rosen Arnsdorff, 13 Candi Orsini, 14 Gina Shlopak, 15 Vicki Bowlin.
Beantown: 1 Moynahan, 2 Money, 3 Flavin, 4 Girouard, 5 Richardson, 6 Heffernan, 7 Bridi, 8 Rutkowski, 9 Cepko, 10 Onufry, 11 Keith, 12 McClure, 13 Morrissey, 14 McVann, 15 Keefe.

== College ==
The 1984 College championship was won by Harvard. Colorado was runner-up.

== Military ==
The 1984 Military Rugby Championship was an 18 team tournament that took place at Fort Stewart, GA from May 11–12 and was won by the home team Fort Stewart with a 25–0 win over Fort Sill.
Preliminary Round:
May 11 Fort Bragg 3–0 29 Palms
May 11 USUHS 11–3 Parris Island
Championship Bracket

First round
May 11 – Fort Stewart, GA
Fort Stewart	13
Camp Lejeune	9
May 11 – Fort Stewart, GA
Fort Bragg	16
Fort Hood	12
May 11 – Fort Stewart, GA
Fort Benning	9
Fort Campbell	4
May 11 – Fort Stewart, GA
West Potomac	7
Fort Dix	4
May 11 – Fort Stewart, GA
Fort Sill	23
Wright Patterson	12
May 11 – Fort Stewart, GA
Davis Monthan	16
Fort Riley	7
May 11 – Fort Stewart, GA
USUHS	3*
Camp Pendleton	3
May 11 – Fort Stewart, GA
Yuma	12
Fort Leavenworth	6

Quarterfinal
May 11 – Fort Stewart, GA
Fort Stewart	17
Fort Bragg	0
May 11 – Fort Stewart, GA
Fort Benning	19
West Potomac	10
May 11 – Fort Stewart, GA
Fort Sill	21
Davis Monthan	0
May 11 – Fort Stewart, GA
USUHS	16
Yuma	0

Semifinal
May 12 – Fort Stewart, GA
Fort Stewart	19
Fort Benning	3
May 12 – Fort Stewart, GA
Fort Sill	13
USUHS	12

Final
May 12 – Fort Stewart, GA
Fort Stewart	25
Fort Sill	0

*Advanced on kicks
Consolation Bracket

Quarter-finals
May 12 – Fort Stewart, GA
Fort Bragg	10
Fort Campbell	8
May 12 – Fort Stewart, GA
29 Palms	3*
West Potomac	3
May 12 – Fort Stewart, GA
Camp Lejeune	12
Yuma	9
May 12 – Fort Stewart, GA
Wright Patterson	16
Davis Monthan	6

Semi-finals
May 12 – Fort Stewart, GA
Fort Bragg	W
29 Palms	L
May 12 – Fort Stewart, GA
Camp Lejeune	W
Wright Patterson	L

Final
May 12 – Fort Stewart, GA
Fort Bragg	46
Camp Lejeune	9

*Advanced on kicks

== Sevens ==
The 1984 National Sevens Rugby Tournament was a 48 team tournament sponsored by Coors and took place on May 27, 1984, at Washington Park in Denver, Colorado. The winners of the eight 6-team groups advanced to the quarterfinals. The Denver Barbarians won the final over Dallas Harlequins.

Quarter-finals
May 27 - Denver, CO
Denver Barbarians	22
Raleigh Hills All Stars	6
May 27 - Denver, CO
Houston	16
Colorado University	6
May 27 - Denver, CO
Dallas Harlequins	14
Denver Highlanders	6
May 27 - Denver, CO
Vail	23
Odessa Mad Dogs	0

Semi-finals
May 27 – Denver, CO
Denver Barbarians	22
Houston	12
May 27 – Denver, CO
Dallas Harlequins	18
Vail	10

Final
May 27 – Denver, CO
Denver Barbarians	14
Dallas Harlequins	12

27 May 1984

Denver Barbarians	14–12	Dallas Harlequins
Try: Roland Solomon; Roland Solomon; Ron Biersdorf; Con: Len Martling		Try: 1 c 2 c Con: 2/2

Denver, CO

== ITT ==
The Inter Territorial Tournament involved the four regional rugby unions comprising the United States RFU: Pacific Coast RFU, Western RFU, Midwest RFU, and the Eastern Rugby Union. The region teams are formed with players selected from the sub regional rugby unions. Subsequently, the USA Eagles are selected from the four regional teams after the ITT concludes. In 1984 the tournament took place in Chicago, IL from May 26–28. The Eastern Rugby Union won the tournament for the first time. The Eastern RU won the Junior Tournament for players under the age of 25.
Results:

26 May 1984

Eastern	30–0	Midwest
Try: Russ Isaac 25' c Chris Doherty 45' c Phil Green 59' c Phil Green 63' c Chris Doherty 81' c Con: Mike Caulder 5/5

Chicago, IL
Referee: Ian Nixon (USARFU)

26 May 1984

Pacific	22–15	Western
Try: Kevin Higgins c Ed Burlingham 45'; Con: Tommy Smith; Pen: Mike Inns 4'; Mike Inns; Mike Inns 64'; Drop: Tommy Smith		Try: Dave Jenkinson 20' c Scott Bertrand 59' c Con: Phil Waterman 2/2; Pen: Phil Waterman 12'

Chicago, IL
Referee: Don Morrison (USARFU)

27 May 1984
1:00 PM

Midwest	16–6	Western
Try: Dan Bostrum 24' c John Apke 34'; Ken Glassmeyer c Con: Roger Castino 2/3		Try: Frank Kennedy c Con: Phil Waterman 1/1

Chicago, IL

27 May 1984

Eastern	13–6	Pacific
Try: Stu McClay 24' c Larry Menyhart 54'; Con: Dick Cooke 1/2; Pen: Dick Cooke 17'		Try: Dave Bateman 82' c Con: Tommy Smith 1/1

Chicago, IL
Referee: Jim Russell (USARFU)

28 May 1984

Midwest	3–0	Pacific
Drop: Tom Beckmann 60'

Chicago, IL
Referee: Ian Nixon (USARFU)

28 May 1984

Eastern	10–0	Western
Try: Jack Donnelly 19' c Stu McClay 50'; Con: Mike Caulder

Chicago, IL
Referee: Jim Russell (USARFU)

Team		W	L
1	Eastern Colonials	3	0
2	Midwest Thunderbirds	2	1
3	Pacific Coast Grizzlies	1	2
4	Western Mustangs	0	3

Champions: Eastern RU
Staff: Mr. Culpepper (Coach), Mr. Little (Manager)
Captain: Larry Menyhart–#8 (Atlanta Renegades)
Roster: Rick Avate–Center (Charlotte), Peter Brock–Prop (Chesapeake), Mike Caulder–Flyhalf (Florida State), Bob Causey–2nd Row (Baton Rouge), Dick Cooke–Flyhalf (Old No.7), Bill Dexter–Prop (Richmond), Dave Dickson–Scrumhalf (Charlotte), Chris Doherty–Center (Washington), Jack Donnelly–Flanker (Boston), Mike Frenzel–2nd Row (New Orleans), Phil Green–Wing (Richmond), Butch Horwath–Prop (Whitemarsh), Russ Isaac–2nd Row (Old Blue), Gary Lambert–Flanker (Life College), Gary Lloyd–Center (Orlando), Lance Manga–Prop (South Jersey), Stu McClay–Wing (Blackthorn), Steve McGinity–Flanker (LSU), Martin McGinn–Hooker (Iron Horse), Ricky Pigott–Scrumhalf (Fort Myers), Dave Priestas–Fullback (Bethlehem), Donald Rae–Flanker (Blackthorn), Peter Sweet–Wing (Richmond), Kevin Swords–2nd Row (Washington), Tom Vinick–Center (Hartford), Jack White–#8 (Beacon Hill), Jeff Wishmeyer–Hooker (Washington).

=== Juniors ===
Semifinals

9 June 1984

Eastern	25–10	Western
Try: Kevin Swords c Ken Eckert c Ken Eckert; Brian Corcoran c Con: Greg Pascale (3/4); Drop: Dave Horton		Try: Rich Frankenheimer; Pen: Rich Frankenheimer (2)

Chicago, IL
Referee: Tom Cayten (CARFU)

9 June 1984

Midwest	13–16	Pacific Coast
Try: Bill Gendel; Pen: Rick Medinis (2); Drop: Rick Medinis 60'		Try: John Metheny; Brian Vizard c Con: Chris O'Brien; Pen: Chris O'Brien; Chris O'Brien OT'

Chicago, IL
Referee: Steve Sivyer

Third place

10 June 1984

West	27–10	Midwest
Try: Jim Ellis c Jim Ellis c John Scott c Con: Rich Frankenheimer; Pen: Rich Frankenheimer; Drop: Mark Gale; Rich Frankenheimer		Try: Sean Madden 5'; Pen: Rick Medinis

Chicago, IL
Referee: Jim Rush

Final

10 June 1984

East	18–9	Pacific Coast
Try: Ken Eckert; John Robbins; Scott Walker 31'; Greg Pascale 83' c Con: Greg Pascale		Try: Mike Minafo; Con: Chris O'Brien; Pen: Chris O'Brien

Chicago, IL
Referee: Morrison (USARFU)

Champions: Eastern RU
Staff: Ray Cornbill (Coach), Mr. Davis (Manager)
Captain: Ken Eckert–#8 (Manhattan), Tony Levitan–Scrumhalf (Old Blue)
Roster: Marc Freitag–Scrumhalf (Washington), Keith Jenkins–2nd Row (Manhattan), Steven Moore–Hooker (LSU), Ed O'Reilly–Flanker (Winged Foot), John Redmond–Prop (Maryland Old Boys), Ted Hynes–Hooker (White Plains), John Robbins–Prop (Washington), Timothy O'Boyle–2nd Row (Rockaway), Kevin Swords–2nd Row (Washington), Gary Geipert–Flanker (LSU), Kenny Chisholm–Flanker (White Plains), Dave Horton–Flyhalf (Whitemarsh), Scott Walker–Wing (Bethlehem), Jay Borkowski–Center (Raleigh), Brian Corcoran–Center (Old Blue), Gregory Pascale–Wing (Washington Irish), Steve Siano–Fullback (Whitemarsh), John Ward–Prop (NC State).

== High School ==
The 1984 National High School Rugby Championship took place at the Polo Fields in San Francisco, CA. The Lamorinda Rodents were the champions.

Semifinals
San Francisco, CA
Xavier Outlaws (NY)	4
Lamorinda Rodents	6
San Francisco, CA
Los Angeles Harbor	L
Del Campo (Sacramento)	W

Final
San Francisco, CA
Lamorinda	22
Del Campo	6

=== Final ===
1984

Lamorinda	22–6	Del Campo
Try: Kirk Goddard; Brett Good; Jim Wilson; Con: Eric Whitaker

San Francisco, CA
