= 2023 Division 1-A Rugby Championship =

Rugby union competition

Division 1-A Rugby Championship

Tournament details
- Countries: United States
- Tournament format(s): knockout
- Date: 6 April 2023 – 6 May 2023

Tournament statistics
- Teams: 12
- Matches played: 11
- Tries scored: 109 (9.91 per match)

Final
- Venue: SaberCats Stadium, Houston
- Champions: Navy (1st title)
- Runners-up: California

The 2023 Division 1-A Rugby Championship is the eleventh season of the Division 1-A Rugby championship, the annual university rugby union competition run by USA Rugby involving the top twelve college teams in the United States. Navy won their first Championship with a 28–22 win over California, capping a perfect 18–0 season.

== Teams ==
Twelve clubs from the six major conferences compete in the 2023 National Championship playoffs.

The distribution of teams is:

- PAC Rugby Conference: two teams
- California: two teams
- Rocky Mountain: one team
- Independent: one team
- Rugby East: two teams
- Mid-South Conference: three teams
- Red River Conference: one team

The following teams qualified for the tournament.

PAC Rugby Conference	California	Rocky Mountain	Independent	Rugby East	Mid-South Conference	Red River Conference
Arizona; California	Cal Poly; Saint Mary's	BYU	Central Washington	Army; Navy	Davenport; Life; Lindenwood	Texas A&M

== Team locations ==
Locations
– East, – West

== Standings ==
Independent
Team	Record	PD
(Washington (state)) Central Washington	8–1	+174

Mid-South
Pos.	Team	Record	PD	BP	Pts
1	(Missouri) Lindenwood	5–1	+181	3	23
2	(Georgia (U.S. state)) Life	4–2	+61	3	19
3	(Michigan) Davenport	3–3	–41	0	12
4	Arkansas State	0–6	–101	1	1

Pac Rugby Conference
Pos.	Team	Record	PD	BP	Pts
1	California	3–0	+169	3	15
2	Arizona	2–1	+76	2	10
3	(California) UCLA	1–2	–5	3	7
4	Utah	0–3	–240	0	0

Rugby East (North)
Pos.	Team	Record	BP	Pts
1	(Maryland) Navy	5–0	3	23
2	(New York (state)) Army	4–1	5	20
3	(New York (state)) St. Bonaventure	3–2	2	14
4	(Ohio) Notre Dame College	2–3	2	10
5	(Pennsylvania) Kutztown	1–4	3	7
6	(Pennsylvania) Penn State	0–5	1	1

Big Ten
Pos.	Team	Record
1	Indiana (W)	5 — 0
2	Ohio State (E)	4 — 1
3	Notre Dame	4 — 1
4	Illinois	3 — 2
5	Wisconsin	3 — 2
6	Michigan State	2 — 3
7	Michigan	1 — 4
8	Purdue	0 — 5

Red River
Pos.	Team	Record	Pts	Pts Diff
1	Texas A&M	6–0	30	+493
2	Texas	4–2	20	+30
3	(Texas) Baylor	3–2	15	-22
4	North Texas	2–3	10	-172
5	Oklahoma	1–4	7	-79
6	Texas Tech	0–5	1	-250

== Bracket ==
Round 1 (April 8)
4	BYU	71
5	Arizona	33
3	California	82
6	Cal Poly	15
4	Army	36
5	Davenport	34
3	Life	82
6	Texas A&M	0

Elite Eight (April 15)
1	Central Washington	31
4	BYU	62
WEST
2	Saint Mary's	28
3	California	29
1	Navy	30
4	Army	6
EAST
2	Lindenwood	29
3	Life	8

Final Four (April 22)
4	BYU	31
3	California	55
1	Navy	12
2	Lindenwood	10

National Championship Game (May 6)
3	California	22
1	Navy	28

=== Round 1 ===
8 April 2023

BYU (Utah)	71–33	Arizona
Try: Manhuinga, Austin, Olivera (3), Matthews (2), Klintworth, Sagala, Barker, Fountaine; Con: Matthews (8)	Report	Try: 19' m, 42' c, 60' c, 66' c, 80' c Con: Hickey (4/5)

South Field, Provo, Utah

8 April 2023

California	82–15	(California) Cal Poly
Try: Clark (2) 2' m, 38 m Aguero 17'; Dixon (2) 21' c, 68' m Santos (2) 24' c, 52' m Kirsten (2) 27' c, 79' m Threlkeld 46' c Walsh 49' m Williams 65' c, Weigold 72' m L. Freeman 76' c Con: Schumacher (4) 21', 24', 27', 46'; Salter (1) 65'; L Brundage (1) 76'; Pen: 10'	Report	Try: 55' c 77' m Con: Crowley (1/2) 55'; Pen: 10'

Witter Rugby Field, Berkeley, California

8 April 2023

Army (New York (state))	36–34	(Michigan) Davenport
Try: Delai 4' c Bardak 16' m Oglesbee 23' c Pattinson 33' c Liskey 77' c Con: Haley (4/5) 4', 23', 33', 77'; Pen: Haley (1) 83'	Report	Try: Howard 11' m Van der Westhuizen (2) 28' m Casey 40' m Kurti 44' m Pen: Nolan (3) 55', 65', 81'

Anderson Rugby Complex, West Point

8 April 2023

Life (Georgia (U.S. state))	82–0	Texas A&M
Try: Carrion, Safodien, Chadwick (2), Crane, Cain, Kramlich, Pantor, Reed, Hoffman, Michnya; Con: Crane (11/12)	Report

Lupo Family Field, Marietta, Georgia

=== Quarter-finals ===
15 April 2023

Central Washington (Washington (state))	31–62	(Utah) BYU
Try: Treacy (2) 30' m, 34' c O'Shannessey 38' c McQuade 58' m Grande 66' c Con: Cline (3/5) 34', 38'	Report	Try: B. Tenney, Parry, Fountaine, Matthews, Biagi, Beck, Vaitohi, Sagala, Clark, Toso; Con: Matthews (6)

Tomlinson Stadium, Ellensburg, Washington

15 April 2023

Saint Mary's (California)	28–29	California
Try: Waqavesi 15' c Pongi 25' c Marchant 34' c Toia'ivoa 78' c Con: Yacubian (3/3); Sorti (1/1)	Report	Try: Clark 29' m Schumacher 38' c Santos 48' c O'Connell 59'; Con: Schumacher (3/4) 38, 48', 59'; Pen: Schumacher (1) 74'

Saint Mary's Stadium, Moraga, California

15 April 2023

Navy (Maryland)	30–6	(New York (state)) Army
Try: MacLaney 7' m Bengston 25' m Opp 44' c Haugh 54' c Con: Krieger (2/4) 44', 54'; Pen: Gray 41'; Krieger 61'	Report	Pen: Haley (2) 25', 32'

Prusmack Rugby Complex, Annapolis, Maryland

16 April 2023

Lindenwood (Missouri)	29–8	(Georgia (U.S. state)) Life
Try: Hardrict II 3' m Bynard (2) 15' c, 30' c Al-Jiboori c Pen: Peignon (1) 69'	Report	Try: Bizer 23' m Pen: King (1)

Harlen C. Hunter Stadium, St. Charles, Missouri

=== Semi-finals ===
22 April 2023

California	55–31	(Utah) BYU
Try: Aguero 2' c Santos (2) 5' m, 78' c O'Connell 30' c Clark 46' m Williams 49' c Zylstra 53' c Penalty Try 73'; Con: Schumacher (5/7) 3', 31', 50', 54', 79'; Pen: Schumacher (1) 64'	Report	Try: Tenney (2) 14' c, 33' c Vaitohi (2) 24 m, 69' c Toso 79' m Con: Hammer (3/5) 15', 34', 70'

Witter Rugby Field, Berkeley, California

22 April 2023

Navy (Maryland)	12–10	(Missouri) Lindenwood
Try: Gray 13' c Bullock 40+2' m Con: Kireger (1/2) 14'	Report	Try: Kige 61' c Con: Peignon (1/1) 62'; Pen: Peignon (1/2) 3'

Prusmack Rugby Complex, Annapolis, Maryland

=== Final ===
6 May 2023

California	22–28	(Maryland) Navy
Try: O'Connell 9' c Shea 13' m Kirsten 52' c Con: Schumacher (2/3) 10', 53'; Pen: Schumacher (1) 23'	Report	Try: Webb 29' c MacLaney 38' c Bullock 62' c Opp 68' c Con: Krieger (4/4) 30', 39', 63', 68'

SaberCats Stadium, Houston

== Rudy Scholz Award ==
=== Winner ===
- Lewis Gray, US Naval Academy

=== Finalists ===
- Wyatt Parry, BYU
- Max Schumacher, Cal
- Joe Marchant, Saint Mary's
- Lewis Gray, US Naval Academy
- Orrin Bizer, Life University

== 2022–2023 First Team All Americans ==
- Gabe Mahuinga – Brigham Young University
- Runako Brynard – Lindenwood University
- Joe Marchant – Saint Mary's College
- Ben Haugh – Navy
- Lucas Pattinson – Army
- Kaipono Kaioshi – Saint Mary's College
- Alex Cleary – Central Washington University
- Orrin Bizer – Life University
- Tiaan Mosconi – Army
- Max Schumacher – University of California – Berkeley
- Nick Hardrict II – Lindenwood University
- EJ Freeman – University of Arizona
- Lewis Gray – Navy
- Daelen Denenberg, Santa Clara University
- Roanin Krieger – Navy
- Emilio Shea – University of California – Berkeley
- Adam Chadwick – Life University
- Connor Devos – Lindenwood University
- Jack McMahon – Navy
- Dominic Besag – Saint Mary's College
- Cole Semu – Brigham Young University
- Calvin Liulamaga – Central Washington University
- Donovan Law, Life University

== See also ==
- College rugby in the United States
- Collegiate Rugby Championship
- Intercollegiate sports team champions
- National Collegiate Rugby Championship results
- United States national under-20 rugby union team
- Varsity Cup Championship
