= 2025 Division 1-A Rugby Championship =

Rugby union competition

Division 1-A Rugby Championship

Tournament details
- Countries: United States
- Tournament format(s): knockout
- Date: April 5, 2025 – May 3, 2025

Tournament statistics
- Teams: 16
- Matches played: 15
- Tries scored: 138 (9.2 per match)

Final
- Venue: Kuntz Memorial Soccer Stadium
- Champions: California (27th title)
- Runners-up: Life

The 2025 Division 1-A Rugby Championship was the thirteenth season of the Division 1-A Rugby championship, the annual university rugby union competition run by USA Rugby involving the top sixteen college teams in the United States. St. Mary's entered as defending champions beating Navy in the 2024 final 26–22 to secure their fourth championship. Cal beat Life in the final 55–38 securing their 27th national collegiate championship and their 29th title including their two Varsity Cup Championship victories.

== Teams ==
Sixteen clubs from the five major conferences compete in the 2025 National Championship playoffs.

The distribution of teams is:

- California: two teams
- Independent: four teams
- Rugby East: five teams
- Mid-West Conference: three teams
- Rocky Mountain: two teams

The following teams qualified for the tournament.

California	East	Independent	Mid-West	Rocky Mountain
Cal Poly; Saint Mary's	Army; Life; Mount St. Mary's; Navy; Penn State	Arizona; California; Central Washington; UCLA	Arkansas State; Davenport; Lindenwood	BYU; Colorado State; University of Utah

== Team locations ==
Locations
– East, – West

== Standings ==
Rugby East
Pos.	Team	Record	PD	BP	Pts
1	(Maryland) Navy	6–1	+169	7	31
2	(Georgia (U.S. state)) Life	6–1	+252	6	30
3	(New York (state)) Army	6–1	+100	6	30
4	(Maryland) Mount St. Mary's	5–2	+49	5	25
5	(North Carolina) Queens	5–2	+48	4	24
6	(New York (state)) St. Bonaventure	4–3	–1	3	19
7	(Virginia) University of Mary Washington	3–4	+40	5	17
8	(Ohio) Walsh University	2–5	–52	4	12
9	(Pennsylvania) Penn State	2–5	–63	3	11
10	(Pennsylvania) Kutztown	2–5	–65	3	11
11	(North Carolina) Belmont Abbey College	1–6	–66	2	6
12	Southern Virginia	0–7	–381	0	0

Big Ten
Big Ten East
Pos.	Team	Record	PD	BP	Points
1	(Indiana) Notre Dame	3–0	3	+63	15
2	Ohio State	2–1	+84	4	12
3	Michigan State	1–2	–75	0	4
4	Michigan	0–3	–75	0	3
Big Ten West
Pos.	Team	Record	PD	BP	Points
1	Indiana	3–0	+101	2	14
2	Wisconsin	2–1	+49	2	10
3	Illinois	1–2	+17	2	6
4	(Indiana) Purdue	0–3	–67	0	0

Mid-West
Pos.	Team	Record	BP	Pts
1	(Missouri) Lindenwood			
2	(Michigan) Davenport			
3	Arkansas State			
4	(Michigan) Adrian			
5	(Illinois) McKendree			

California
Pos.	Team	Record	PD	BP	Pts
1	(California) Saint Mary's	8–0	+617	8	40
2	(California) Cal Poly	7–1	+553	9	37
3	(California) UC Santa Barbara	6–2	+64	6	30
4	(California) Long Beach	5–3	+49	5	25
5	(California) San Diego State	3–5	–239	4	16
6	(California) Sacramento State	2–6	–208	5	13
7	(California) Santa Cruz	2–6	–235	5	13
8	(California) Santa Clara	2–6	–359	5	10
9	(California) UC Davis	1–7	–270	3	7

Independent
Team	Record	PD
Arizona	8–6	
California	11–1	
(Washington (state)) Central Washington	6–2	
(Arizona) Grand Canyon University	5–4	
(California) UCLA	4–4	
University of Texas at El Paso		
Texas A&M		

Rocky Mountain
Team	Record	PD	BP	Pts
(Utah) BYU	5–0	+353	5	25
Colorado State	5–0	+216	4	24
(Colorado) Air Force	3–2	+4	3	15
Utah State	2–3	–107	2	10
University of Wyoming	2–3	–144	0	8
University of Colorado	1–4	–62	4	8
Utah Valley	1–4	–148	2	6
University of Utah	1–4	–109	1	5

== Bracket ==
Playoffs

Sweet 16 (April 5)	Elite Eight (April 12)
1	California	76
8	Colorado State	7
1	California	74
5	Arizona	45
4	Cal Poly	19
5	Arizona	47
WEST
3	Central Washington	53
6	BYU	26
3	Central Washington	48
2	Saint Mary's	53
2	Saint Mary's	24
7	UCLA	17
1	Life	92
8	Davenport	7
1	Life	18
4	Army	17
4	Army	25
5	Mount St. Mary's	15
EAST
3	Lindenwood	24
6	Arkansas State	7
3	Lindenwood	10
2	Navy	3
2	Navy	45
7	Penn State	7

Final Four (April 19)
1	California	38
2	Saint Mary's	27
1	Life	31
3	Lindenwood	7

National Championship Game (May 3)
1	California	55
1	Life	38

=== Round 1 ===
5 April 2025

California	76–7	Colorado State
Try: T Jones 4' c O Teague 10' m K O'Connell (2) 12' c, 56' m C Biller (2) 16' c, 35' c Q Spieker (3) 27' m, 40' c, 53' c J Byszio 46' m T Rainsford (2) 62' c, 71' c Con: K O'Connell (7/11) 4', 12', 16', 35', 40', 53', 62'; C Saint (1/1) 71'	Report	Try: E Eagle 6' c Con: (1/1) 6'

Witter Rugby Field, Berkeley, California

5 April 2025

Cal Poly (California)	19–47	Arizona
Try: 53' c Con: (2/3)	Report	Try: N Morgan c C Blair 7' c L Smith; J Jaffe (2); Penalty try L Smith 56' c A Gonzalez; Con: M Berenger (5/6)

Damon-Garcia Field, San Luis Obispo, California

5 April 2025

Central Washington (Washington (state))	53–26	(Utah) BYU
Try: O Treacy (3) 3' m, 8' c, 62' m A Tauiliili 13' c 27' m S Dwyer 42' c C Grosse 45' c B Ward 51' m, 55' m L Clark 72' c Con: J Tregoning 8', 13', 42', 45', 72'	Report	Try: 6' c 22' m V Fitisemanu 69' c

Tomlinson Stadium, Ellensburg, Washington

5 April 2025

Saint Mary's (California)	24–17	(California) UCLA
Try: S Ofa (2) m, 30'c B McKeon 20' m D Besag 44' c Con: O Cline (2/4) 20', 44'	Report	Try: A McCarthy 54' m D Odejinmi 71' c F Jobber 76' m Con: V Allue (2/3) 71'

Saint Mary's Stadium, Moraga, California

5 April 2025

Life (Georgia (U.S. state))	92–7	(Michigan) Davenport
Try: A Chadwick; Penalty Try; B Araujo; J Rose (4); K Cunningham (2); P Simamane; J Spence (2); W Piggins; A Faison; Con: B Crane (6/7); J Spence (2/3); J Lee (3/4)	Report	Con: (1/1)

Lupo Family Field, Marietta, Georgia

5 April 2025

Army (New York (state))	25–13	(Maryland) Mount St. Mary's
Try: D Liskey 34' m J Bottarini 40' m H Heller 68' c M Doyle 73' m Con: H Heller (1/4) 68'; Pen: H Heller (1/1) 4'	Report	Try: R McGettigan 63' m H McKay 80' m Con: E Corbett (0/2); Pen: E Corbett (1/1) 11'

Anderson Rugby Complex, West Point, New York

5 April 2025

Lindenwood (Missouri)	24–7	Arkansas State
Try: R Richardson-Mould 5' m Penalty try 35'; E van Heerden 44' c I Ingram 71' m Con: B Mason (1/3) 44'	Report	Try: 39' c Con: (1/1) 39'

Lindenwood Track Complex, St. Charles, Missouri

5 April 2025

Navy (Maryland)	45–7	(Pennsylvania) Penn State
Try: I Bullock 6' m A Young (2) 12' c, 55' c R Krieger 16' c R Hotaling 44' c M Smith (2) 60' m, 64' c Con: R Krieger (5/7) 12', 16', 44' 55', 64'	Report	Try: 3' c Con: (1/1) 3'

Prusmack Rugby Center, Annapolis, Maryland

=== Quarter-finals ===
12 April 2025

California	74–45	Arizona
Try: M Koi (3) 8' c, 25' c, 69' c J Kirsten (3) 12' m, 30' c, 63' c Penalty try 19'; F Edstrom 38' m C Walsh 41' m C Biller 48' c 72' c Con: F Edstrom (7/10) 8', 25', 30', 48', 63', 69' 72'; Pen: F Edstrom (1/1) 11'	Report	Try: Penalty try 22'; S Gerstl (2) 45' c, 67' c A Gradwick-Light 54' m C Blair 59' m A Gonzalez 76' c B Johnson 79' c Con: Berenger (4/6) 45', 67', 76', 79'

Witter Rugby Field, Berkeley, California

12 April 2025

Saint Mary's (California)	53–48	(Washington (state)) Central Washington
Try: Siale Ofa 8' m B Mckeon (2) 10' m, 64' c Sione Ofa (2) 23' c, 42' c M Storti 37' c I Toia’ivao (2) 48' m, 52' c Con: O Cline (5/8) 23', 37', 42', 52', 64'; Pen: O Cline (1/1) 70'	Report	Try: O Treacy (2) 5' c, 74' c A Miller (2) 20' m, 78' c D Farrington 27' m S Dwyer 32' c C Robb 56' c Con: J Tregoning 5', 32', 56', 74', 78'; Pen: J Tregoning (1/1) 79'

Saint Mary's Stadium, Moraga, California

12 April 2025

Life (Georgia (U.S. state))	18–17	(New York (state)) Army
Try: N Wingord 22' m S Kramlich 60' c Con: B Crane (1/2); Pen: B Crane (2)	Report	Try: L Lentfer c C Loudenback c Con: H Heller (2/2); Pen: H Heller (1)

Lupo Family Field, Marietta, Georgia

12 April 2025

Navy (Maryland)	3–10	(Missouri) Lindenwood
Pen: R Krieger (1) 45'	Report	Try: D Krige 46' c Con: B Forward (1/1) 47'; Pen: B Forward (1) 4'

Prusmack Rugby Center, Annapolis, Maryland

=== Semi-finals ===
19 April 2025

California	38–27	(California) Saint Mary's
Try: H Schreuder 11' c J Kirsten 25' c M Kosi (2) 33' c, 51' m R Santos 42' c S Williams 65' m Con: F Edstrom (4/6) 13', 25' 34', 42'	Report	Try: D Besag 30' m M Storti 58' c Siale Ofa 70' m 80' c Con: O Cline (2/4) 58', 80'; Pen: O Cline 19'

Witter Rugby Field, Berkeley, California

19 April 2025

Life (Georgia (U.S. state))	31–7	(Missouri) Lindenwood
Try: B Araujo 7' c J Vassel 46' c A Chadwick 57' c W Piggins 66'; Con: B Crane (4/4) 7', 46', 57', 66'; Pen: B Crane (1) 70'	Report	Try: D Cathcart 23' c Con: B Forward (1/1) 23'

Lupo Family Field, Marietta, Georgia

=== Final ===
3 May 2025

California	55–38	(Georgia (U.S. state)) Life
Try: D Paga 15' c O Kirk 23' c M Thrlkeld 26' c Emmett Cook 32' c M Koi (2) 40' m, 77' m O Newall 68' c L Kirsten 71' c Con: F Edstrom (7/9) 15', 23', 26', 32', 68', 71'; Pen: F Edstrom (1/1) 2'	Report	Try: J Rose 7' c A Chadwick (3) 17' m, 20' c, 56' c K Cunningham 29' c W Piggins 62' m Con: B Crane (4/6) 7', 20', 29', 56'

Kuntz Memorial Soccer Stadium, Indianapolis, Indiana

== Rudy Scholz Award ==
=== Winner ===
- Oscar Treacy – CWU

=== Finalists ===
- Bradley Crane – Life University
- Roanin Krieger – Navy
- Duncan Krige – Lindenwood
- Oscar Treacy – CWU
- John Wilson – Saint Mary's

=== Nominations ===
- Coby Baker – Cal Poly
- Matteo Berenger – Arizona
- Dom Besag – Saint Mary's
- Bastian Brunello – Mount St. Mary's
- Adam Chadwick – Life University
- Evan Corbett – Mount St. Mary's
- Bradley Crane – Life University
- Antonio Esteves – Brown
- Nate Gould – Army
- Aaron Juma – heeling / UMW
- Roanin Krieger – Navy
- Duncan Krige – Lindenwood
- Hilton Olivier – Queens U. Charlotte
- Jack Phillips – Kentucky
- Campbell Robb – CWU
- Rand Santos – Cal
- Will Sherman – UCLA
- Oscar Treacy – CWU
- Logan Turner – UCLA
- William Webb – Navy
- Solomon Williams – Cal
- John Wilson – Saint Mary's

== 2024–2025 First Team All Americans ==
- Aaron Juma – Mary Washington
- Aaron Van Dyk – Arkansas State
- Adam Chadwick – Life University
- Andrew Bardak – Army
- Asher Webb Lindenwood
- Avion Ganse – Navy
- Bastian Brunello – Mount St. Mary's
- Bautista Araujo – Life University
- Ben Peters – Mary Washington
- Benji Kemp – Army
- Bradley Crane – Life University
- Brett Dogiewicz – Cal Poly
- Brian Bogne – California
- Brook Vaitohi – BYU
- Byron Finley – California
- Cade Crist – California
- Kade Cunningham – Life University
- Cameron Blair – Arizona
- Campbell Robb – Central Washington
- Cathal Coakley – Saint Mary's
- Chad Tinney – Lindenwood
- Charles Jansen van vuuren – Davenport
- Charlie Walsh – California
- Coby Baker – Cal Poly
- Cole Williams – Wyoming
- Connor Devos – Lindenwood
- Dalton Slaughter – Arizona
- Daniel Moscrop – Mary Washington
- David Scanlon – Lindenwood
- Dom Besag – Saint Mary's
- Drew Baublitz – Navy
- Duncan Krige – Lindenwood
- Ed Soeder – Navy
- Eduan Van Heerden – Lindenwood
- Elias Garza – Life University
- Evan Corbett – Mount St. Mary's
- Freddie Jobber – UCLA
- Gabe Savage – Army
- George Engles – Army
- Hayden McKay – Mount St. Mary's
- Henry Duke – Virginia
- Hunter Modlin – Saint Mary's
- Ian Bullock – Navy
- Ian Roudybush – Penn State
- Iosefa (JT) Toia'ivao – Saint Mary's
- Iremia Iremia – California
- Jack Breslan – Arizona
- Jacob Hall – Arizona
- Jacob Razo – Illinois
- Jake Cornelius – Navy
- James Rose – Life University
- James Tenney – BYU
- Jeremy Zwick – Lindenwood
- Jeronimo Ballesty – Michigan State
- Joey Reiss – Indiana
- John Henry Rouse – Saint Mary's
- John Wilson – Saint Mary's
- Jordan Vassel – Life University
- Joshua Cox – UCLA
- Joshua Peacock – Davenport
- King Matu – Saint Mary's
- Kye Jones – Central Washington
- Lachlan Treister – Penn State
- JD Bengston – Navy
- Leon Best – Life University
- Logan Ballinger – Life University
- Logan Turner – UCLA
- Lucas Greene – UC Santa Barbara
- Mario Storti – Saint Mary's
- Masi Koi – California
- Mateo Berenger – Arizona
- Mathew Abbes – Saint Mary's
- Max Smith – Navy
- Max Threlkeld – California
- Michael Kalalau – Navy
- Michael Strehle – Navy
- Miles Bell – Michigan State
- Nahuel Wingord – Life University
- Nate Deegan – Saint Mary's
- Nate Gould – Army
- Nico Domine – Cal Poly
- Oliver Kirk – California
- Ollie Cline – Saint Mary's
- Onika Sethosa – Arkansas State
- Oscar Treacy – Central Washington
- Padric Casey – Cal Poly
- Philani Simamane – Life University
- Rand Santos – California
- Roanin Kreiger – Navy
- Ryan Wenstrom – California
- Sam Masterson – Colorado State
- Sam McMillan – UCLA
- Samson Brown – Claremont Colleges
- Saul Pitout – Davenport
- Seamus Deely – California
- Sebastian Shefferman – Mary Washington
- Seth Kramlich – Life University
- Shaun Mathyssen – Life University
- Siale Ofa – Saint Mary's
- Solomon Williams – California
- Sosia Pongi – Saint Mary's
- Takunda Makiwa – Davenport
- Tanner Russel – Navy
- Tevita Mapa – Life University
- Tiai Vavao – Central Washington
- Tobey Barnfield Lee – Mary Washington
- Tristan Hubsch – Life University
- Warrick Day – Arkansas State
- Welton Charumbira – St. Thomas University
- Will Lindsay – Mary Washington
- Will Sherman – UCLA
- William Webb – Navy
- Wyatt Parry – BYU
