= America First Field =

Soccer stadium in Sandy, Utah, U.S.

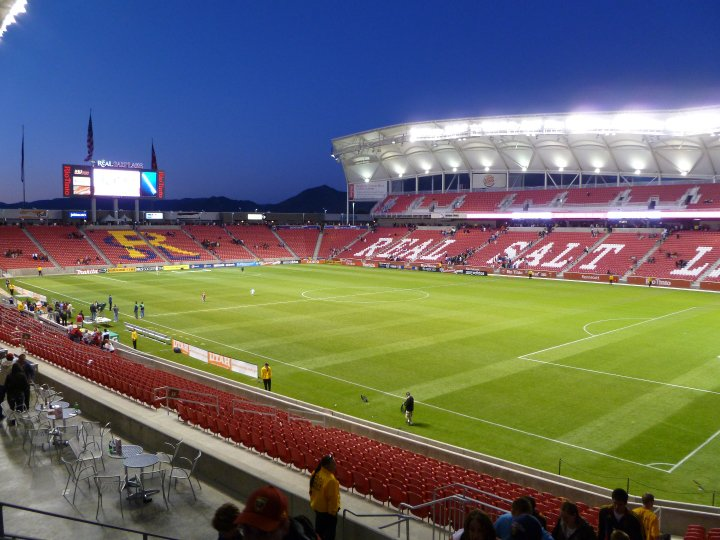
- Interior view of the stadium

- Location in Utah Location in the United States Location in North America
- Interactive map of America First Field
- Former names: Rio Tinto Stadium (2008–2022)
- Address: 9256 South State Street
- Location: Sandy, Utah, U.S.
- Coordinates: 40.5829°N 111.8934°W
- Elevation: 4,450 ft (1,360 m)
- Owner: Miller Sports + Entertainment (Gail Miller)
- Operator: Real Salt Lake
- Capacity: 20,213
- Surface: Kentucky Bluegrass
- Field size: 120 × 75 yards
- Public transit: TRAX Light Rail; Blue Line at Sandy Expo

Construction
- Groundbreaking: August 12, 2006; 20 years ago
- Opened: October 9, 2008; 18 years ago
- Cost: $110 million ($164 million in 2025 dollars)
- Architect: Rossetti Architects
- Project manager: ICON Venue Group
- Structural engineers: Martin & Associates
- Services engineers: M-E Engineers, Inc.
- General contractor: Layton-Turner Joint Venture

Tenants
- Real Salt Lake (MLS) (2008–present); Utah Royals (NWSL) (2018–2020, 2024–present); Utah UFL team (UFL) (2028–future)

Website
- americafirstfield.com

America First Field (formerly Rio Tinto Stadium and referred to as The RioT) is a soccer-specific stadium in Sandy, Utah, United States. It is the home of Real Salt Lake of Major League Soccer (MLS) and the Utah Royals of the National Women's Soccer League (NWSL). The stadium opened on October 9, 2008, and seats 20,213 for soccer, but can be expanded to over 25,000 for concerts. It has also been expanded to 22,213 via temporary seating for soccer games when increased demand calls for it. In September 2026, it was announced the stadium will be the home of a UFL football expansion team starting in 2028.

The stadium hosted the 2009 MLS All-Star Game, the second leg of the 2011 CONCACAF Champions League Finals, and the final of the 2013 Lamar Hunt US Open Cup. It was also a host stadium during the 2013 CONCACAF Gold Cup, and a host for final stages of the 2015 CONCACAF Men's Olympic Qualifying Championship.

Rio Tinto's naming rights were to expire in December 2020 but the stadium retained its branding through 2021. Real Salt Lake sought a ten-year commitment from its next stadium naming rights partner. In September 2022, RSL announced a naming rights agreement with America First Credit Union with the stadium renamed America First Field.

== History ==
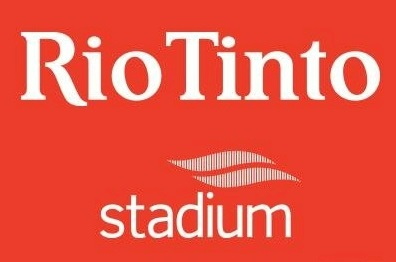
Rio Tinto Stadium logo (2008–2022)

Before Real Salt Lake moved into America First Field, parties from several cities, including Rochester, New York and St. Louis, Missouri, expressed interest in purchasing the franchise and moving it. RSL had been playing at the University of Utah's Rice-Eccles Stadium. Other stadium sites in the area were also proposed, including the Utah State Fairgrounds in Salt Lake City, and the tiny town of Vineyard, just west of Provo. Finally, on the very day team owner Dave Checketts had set as a deadline to have a stadium plan in place or decide to sell the team, and after months of up and down discussions with local municipalities, county, and state officials and a change in the funding structure, a tacit agreement between Checketts, Sandy City, and Salt Lake County was put in place, and Real Salt Lake announced that they would move forward with the construction of Real Salt Lake Stadium, which would ultimately be named Rio Tinto Stadium.

The groundbreaking, coinciding with the Xango Cup, Real's match against international power Real Madrid, took place that afternoon featuring elected leaders, team officials, as well as the entire rosters of both Real Salt Lake and Real Madrid. On August 15, the deal was officially approved by the Salt Lake County Council.

The stadium plan encountered difficulties however after the Debt Review Committee of Salt Lake County voted against the stadium proposal 4–0 on January 26, 2007, citing what they saw as Real Salt Lake's financial inviability as the reasoning behind the lack of support. County Mayor Corroon concurred with the DRC and the stadium plan was effectively killed on January 29, 2007. In response Real Salt Lake's owner announced the team would be sold and likely move out of the Salt Lake area after the 2007 season.

The Sandy Stadium proposal was not completely dead, however: a new stadium proposal was made on February 2, that would divert 15 percent, roughly $2 million a year, of the county's hotel taxes to the stadium project beginning in July until 2017. Such a deal would have to have been made by February 9, or the deal would have been completely off. The bill was passed by the State Senate.

After Governor Huntsman made a move that would allow the team to remain in Salt Lake County: the Utah House approved House bill 1SHB38, by a 48–24 margin, effectively approving $35 million towards the development of Real Salt Lake's new home. The governor was expected to sign the bill, and ultimately did so.

Sandy City, along with the state of Utah and representatives of the team, finally came to an agreement regarding the placement of the Real stadium. The deal was shot down about a week prior to the agreement by the Salt Lake County Mayor Peter Corroon saying it was too risky. However, Utah's governor, Jon Huntsman Jr. said that soccer was here to stay. The $110 million stadium was built in Sandy, a suburb of Salt Lake City. Rossetti's California office was the architecture firm responsible for the design of the new stadium. The stadium's opening date was set for October 9, 2008, when Real Salt Lake hosted the New York Red Bulls.

On September 28, 2008, it was announced that the naming rights to the stadium were sold to international mining company Rio Tinto, owners of local mining operation Kennecott Utah Copper. A 15-year deal was set into place, worth between $1.5 million and $2 million per year. On September 10, 2022, Riverdale-based America First Credit Union bought the naming rights to the stadium.

On April 18, 2025, Miller Sports + Entertainment, led by former Utah Jazz owner Gail Miller, acquired the stadium as part of a $600 million deal for Real Salt Lake.

== Use ==
=== Club soccer ===
As home to the Utah Royals, America First Field also boasts hosting the second highest attendance in the NWSL, third highest of any professional women's team in America.

In 2021, America First Field also hosted home matches for Vancouver Whitecaps FC as COVID-19 cross-border restrictions imposed by the Canadian government prevented the team from playing matches in Canada. In January 2022, the stadium and Real Salt Lake were sold to David Blitzer and Ryan Smith.

=== International soccer ===
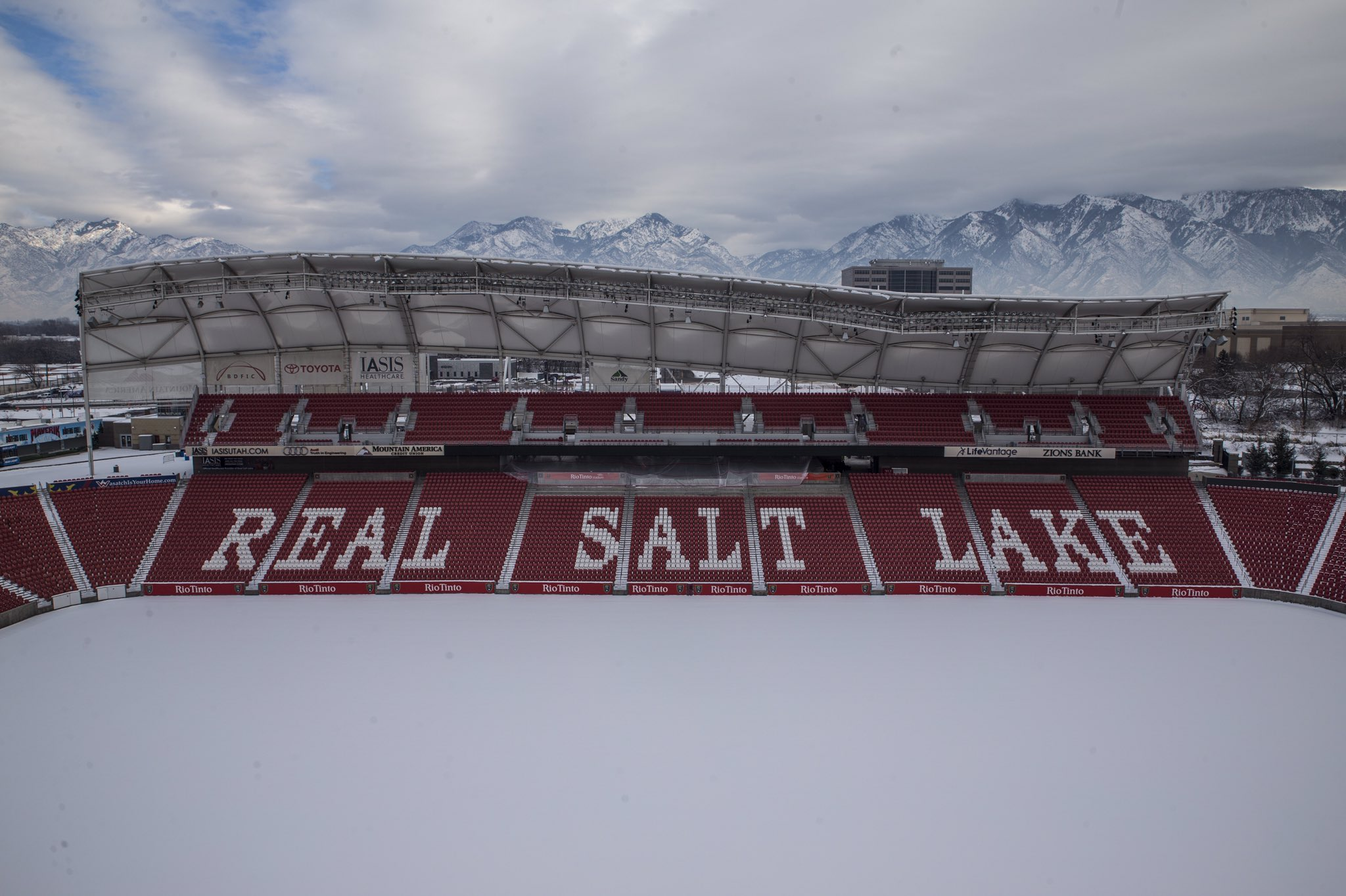
America First Field sits at the base of the Wasatch Range

Since the stadium opened its doors, it has become a very popular place for the United States men's national soccer team to play matches against regional opponents. The first match held by the team at the stadium took place on September 9, 2009, against El Salvador, in a fourth-round qualifier for the 2010 FIFA World Cup; the game ended in a 2–1 victory for the home side in front of 19,000 spectators. The team returned to the stadium on June 18, 2013, in a fourth-round qualifier game for the 2014 FIFA World Cup against Honduras; the home side once again won at the stadium, this time a 1–0 victory in front of 20,250 people.

The stadium was used as a host stadium during the 2013 CONCACAF Gold Cup, and hosted two back-to-back games for Group C on July 13, 2013. In the first game, the United States defeated Cuba by a score of 4–1, while in the second, Costa Rica pulled out a 1–0 win against Belize; both games took place in front of a crowd of 17,597 spectators.

The United States women's national soccer team has also played three matches against international opponents at the stadium. The first game was played on March 31, 2010, as a friendly match against Mexico; in the first winter game ever played by the US team, the home side ended up winning the match 1–0, thanks to a second half goal by Abby Wambach. The second game took place as another friendly match on June 30, 2012, against Canada; once again, the home side ended up winning the game, 2–1, in front of 16,800 spectators. The third game was a friendly match on September 13, 2014, against Mexico; the home side ended up winning 8–0.

Additionally, the stadium hosted the 4 knockout stage matches of the 2015 CONCACAF Men's Olympic Qualifying Championship. These included a 2–0 Honduras victory over the United States and a 2–0 Mexico victory over Canada in the semifinals, then a 2–0 United States victory over Canada in the third place game and a 2–0 Mexico victory over Honduras in the final.

=== Rugby union ===
America First Field has been used on several occasions for rugby matches. The USA Eagles defeated Uruguay 43–9 in front of 5,060 fans in 2008. The first college rugby match in the stadium took place between college sides BYU and Utah in March 2010, and was also used as the site of the 2011 USA Rugby Championship, in which UC-Berkeley defeated BYU 21–14 in front of 11,000 fans. The following year BYU faced Arkansas State University in the final, defeating them. In May 2014, the Varsity Cup Collegiate Rugby National Championship final match saw BYU defeat UC-Berkeley 43–33 in front of 10,172 fans.

Utah Warriors played an exhibition game against Glendale Raptors at America First Field on March 30, 2018, ahead of their inaugural Major League Rugby season in front of 9,186 fans. In September 2023 the stadium hosted the United States men's national team and French team Stade Toulousain, one of the most successful clubs in Europe, a game which "the Eagles" won 24–21. On June 28, 2024, America First Field hosted a record crowd for a Utah Warriors match with 10,900 fans in attendance.

Date	Home	Score	Away	Event	Attendance	Ref.
November 8, 2008	United States	43–9	Uruguay	2008 end of year tests	5,060	
May 21, 2011	(Utah) BYU	14–21	(California) Cal	2011 Division 1-A Final	11,000	
May 20, 2012	(Utah) BYU	49–42	Arkansas State	2012 Division 1-A Final	8,733	
May 3, 2014	(Utah) BYU	43–33	(California) Cal	2014 Varsity Cup Final	10,172	
May 2, 2015	(Utah) BYU	30–27	(California) Cal	2015 Varsity Cup Final	9,033	
March 30, 2018	Utah Warriors	15–43	(Colorado) Glendale Raptors	2018 Major League Rugby pre-season	9,186	
September 17, 2023	United States	24–21	(France) Stade Toulousain	Friendly		
June 28, 2024	Utah Warriors	24–31	(California) FC Los Angeles	2024 Major League Rugby season	10,906	

=== Concerts ===
Date	Artist(s)	Opening act(s)	Tour	Tickets sold	Revenue	Additional notes
May 9, 2009	The Eagles	Michelle Branch	Long Road Out of Eden Tour	18,853 / 19,984	$2,183,969	The first concert ever held at the stadium.
July 13, 2010	Paul McCartney	—	Up and Coming Tour	25,414 / 25,414	$3,193,716	This is the first time McCartney had ever done a show in the state of Utah.
September 22, 2010	Kiss	—	The Hottest Show on Earth Tour	—	—	This was the band's first show in the state in seven years.
July 21, 2011	Journey	Foreigner; Night Ranger	Eclipse Tour	11,510 / 13,972	$737,642	
July 28, 2012	Neil Diamond	—	—	—	—	
July 27, 2013	Jason Aldean	Thomas Rhett; Jake Owen	2013 Night Train Tour	—	—	

== Attendance records (soccer) ==
=== Real Salt Lake games ===
As of May 8, 2026

Rank	Date	Game	Result	Attendance	Notes
1	August 6, 2022	vs (United States) LAFC	L 1-4	21,810	
2	June 22, 2024	vs (United States) LA Galaxy	L 0–1	21,570	
3	July 3, 2024	vs (United States) Houston Dynamo FC	W 3–2	21,522	
4	April 22, 2026	vs (United States) Inter Miami CF	L 0–2	21,512	
5	August 26, 2023	vs (United States) Houston Dynamo FC	L 0–3	21,471	
6	September 1, 2018	vs (United States) LA Galaxy	W 6–2	21,363	
7	October 10, 2022	vs (United States) Portland Timbers	W 3–1	21,333	
8	October 7, 2023	vs (United States) Sporting Kansas City	L 2–3	21,205	
9	August 24, 2024	vs (United States) San Jose Earthquakes	L 0–2	21,015	
10	September 19, 2015	vs (United States) LA Galaxy	W 3–0	21,004	
11	July 4, 2015	vs (United States) Orlando City SC	D 1–1	20,956	

=== Utah Royals games ===
As of May 23, 2025

Rank	Date	Game	Result	Attendance	Notes
1	March 16, 2024	vs (United States) Chicago Red Stars	L 0–2	20,370	Inaugural home game of revived franchise
2	April 18, 2025	vs (United States) Chicago Red Stars	W 1–0	17,085	
3	April 14, 2018	vs (United States) Chicago Red Stars	L 0–1	19,203	Inaugural home game of original franchise
4	April 20, 2019	vs (United States) Washington Spirit	W 1–0	18,015	
5	May 3, 2019	vs (United States) Chicago Red Stars	W 1–0	16,556	
6	July 19, 2019	vs (United States) Portland Thorns FC	D 2–2	15,931	
7	August 23, 2024	vs (United States) Bay FC	W 2–1	14,539	
8	September 8, 2018	vs (United States) Chicago Red Stars	W 2–1	11,851	
9	May 23, 2025	vs (United States) Orlando Pride	L 1–3	11,668	
10	September 6, 2019	vs (United States) Portland Thorns FC	W 1–0	10,897	

=== International games ===
==== Men's ====
As of June 9, 2021

Rank	Date	Game	Result	Attendance	Notes
1	September 4, 2015	Mexico vs Trinidad and Tobago	3–3	20,560	Friendly match
2	June 18, 2013	United States vs Honduras	1–0	20,250	2014 FIFA World Cup qualification – CONCACAF fourth round
3	September 5, 2009	United States vs El Salvador	2–1	19,066	2010 FIFA World Cup qualification – CONCACAF fourth round
4	June 9, 2021	United States vs Costa Rica	4–0	19,007	Friendly match
5	July 13, 2013	United States vs Cuba	4–1	17,597	2013 CONCACAF Gold Cup Group C
5	July 13, 2013	Costa Rica vs Belize	1–0	17,597	2013 CONCACAF Gold Cup Group C
6	June 3, 2017	United States vs Venezuela	1–1	17,315	Friendly match

==== Women's ====
As of October 26, 2023

Rank	Date	Game	Result	Attendance	Notes
1	June 30, 2012	United States vs Canada	2–1	16,805	Friendly match
2	June 28, 2022	United States vs Colombia	2–0	16,077	Friendly match
3	October 19, 2016	United States vs Switzerland	4–0	14,336	Friendly match
4	June 7, 2018	United States vs China	1–0	13,230	Friendly match
5	October 26, 2023	United States vs Colombia	0–0	13,058	Friendly match
6	September 13, 2014	United States vs Mexico	8–0	8,849	Friendly match
7	March 31, 2010	United States vs Mexico	1–0	3,732	Friendly match

== Sponsorship ==
On September 20, 2008, it was announced that the naming rights to the stadium would be awarded to international mining company Rio Tinto, the owners of the local Kennecott Utah Copper mining company and its Bingham Canyon Mine on the west side of the Salt Lake Valley. A 10-year naming deal was signed, valued at around $1.5 million to $2 million a year. On September 10, 2022, Riverdale-based America First Credit Union bought the naming rights to the stadium, renaming it to America First Field.

== See also ==
- List of soccer stadiums in the United States
- Lists of stadiums

Events and tenants
Preceded by Rice-Eccles Stadium	Home of Real Salt Lake; 2008–present	Succeeded by Current
