= 1980 National Collegiate Rugby Championship =

Tournament details
- Tournament format(s): Knockout
- Date: May 17 – 18, 1980

Tournament statistics
- Teams: 4
- Matches played: 4
- Tries scored: 9 (2.25 per match)
- Top point scorer(s): Mick Luckhurst
- Top try scorer(s): Mark Deaton

Final
- Venue: Credit Island, Davenport, IA
- Champions: California (1st title)
- Runners-up: Air Force

The 1980 National Collegiate Rugby Championship was the first edition of an official national championship for intercollegiate rugby organized by the U.S. Rugby Football Union. The tournament was sponsored by Michelob and hosted by Palmer College of Chiropractic at Credit Island in Davenport, Iowa. The Cal Bears were victorious in large part to Mick Luckhurst who was tournament MVP.

== Venue ==
Iowa
Credit Island	1980 National Collegiate Rugby Championship is located in Iowa
Davenport, Iowa	1980 National Collegiate Rugby Championship is located in Iowa
Capacity:	1980 National Collegiate Rugby Championship is located in Iowa

== Participants ==
Illinois
Qualified for the National Championship by winning the college division of the Mid-America Cup at the Midwest Rugby Championship at Wright-Patterson Air Force Base in Dayton, OH.

- First round
  Illinois 17-0 Dayton
- Second round
  Illinois 16-10 Palmer
- Semifinal
  Illinois 8-3 Ohio State
- Final
  Illinois 7-6 Minnesota

Roster:
President- Jeff Ruckman
Coach- Merle Faminow
Captain- Kevin McSweeney
Record 22-4-1(10–1–1)
Bruce Anderson (Center), Rob Beer (Prop), Craig Bergen (Prop), Dean Bostrom (#8), Bruce Gillingham (#8), Pete Hancock (Scrumhalf), Joe Janikas (Wing), Mark Kahn (Prop), Steve Lardner (Scrumhalf), Drew Kuhter (Lock), Pete McHugh (Wing), Kevin McSweeney (Flyhalf), Brian Mullery (Fullback), Mickey O'Neil (Hooker), Jim Quinn (Scrumhalf), Jeff Ruckman (Flanker), J.W. Sears (Hooker), Rick Smith (Center), Tony Sparrow (Flanker), Keith Surroz (Lock), Joe Vanderbranden (Center), Jeff Young (Wing).

Navy
Qualified for the National Championship by winning the Eastern Collegiate Cup on April 5–6 at Virginia Tech in Blacksburg, VA.

- Navy 18-3 South Florida
- Navy 14-10 Cornell
- Navy 6-4 Virginia Tech
- Navy 12-6 Army

Roster:
Coach- Dewey Mateer
Record (10–1–1)
Matt Aylward (Prop), Tom Brodmerkel (Lock), Jim Brownlowe (Center), John Burke (Prop), Jerry Chandler (Scrumhalf), Deryl Chen (Wing), Mike Coughlin (Wing), Dan Dewispelaere (Flyhalf), Jeff Freeman (Wing), Chuck French (Scrumhalf), James Hickey (#8), Rick Keller (Hooker), Jim King (Center), Steve Laukaitis (#8), Bob Matheny (Fullback), Herb McMillan (Flanker), Jim Merrill (Center), Kent Mills (Flanker), Dennis Murphy (Center), Keith Shultis (Prop), Brad Smith (Lock), John Theiss (Lock).

Air Force Falcons
Qualified for the National Championship by winning the West Regional on 2–4 May in Lawrence, KS.

- Air Force def. Principia of St. Louis
- Air Force def.University of Northern Colorado

Roster:
Coach- Alan Osur
Captains- Kevin Nagie/Steve Miller
Record- 11–1
Brad Brown (Flyhalf), Jeff Burroughs (Lock), Bob Cushing (Scrumhalf), Jeff Dodson (Prop), Paul Frappier (Center), Tom Jee (Flanker), Tom Jones (Center), Jeff Lamont (Lock), Brian McNabb (Wing), Steve Miller (Fullback), Joe Motz (Scrumhalf), Kevin Nagie (Flanker), Fred Origel (Prop), Mark Ploederer (#8), Jason Prokopowicz (Prop), Jeff Richard (Flanker), Tom Robbins (Center), Mark Roling (Lock), Jerry Sirote (Hooker), Art Smith (Wing), Paul Smith (#8), Bruce Stark (Center).

California
Qualified from Far West Regional on April 26–27 at Stanford. A three team round robin was organized by Michelob during the Monterey tournament.

- California 18-10 California State Long Beach
- California 16-3 Stanford

Roster:
Coach- Ned Anderson
Record 15–5–1
Buzz Brown (Prop), Darrell Breedlove (#8), Jim Castignani (Wing), Kevin Dakis (Wing), Mark Deaton (#8), Scott Denardo (Prop), Frank Helm (Hooker), Donald Hooper (Flyhalf), Tom Horvath (Lock), Mike Lemmon (Back), Tom Lemmon (Center), Mick Luckhurst (Fullback), Jeff McDermott (Flanker), Ken Meyersieck, (Scrumhalf), Tim O'Brien (Center), Doug Raisch (Prop), Bob Spurzem (Prop), Matthew Taylor (Wing), Brian Vincent (Flanker), Bob Williams (Scrumhalf).

== Bracket ==
Regional Semifinal
April 26 - Stanford, CA
California	16
Stanford	3
April 26 - Stanford, CA
California State Long Beach	10
Stanford	9
April 6 - Blacksburg, VA
Navy	6
Virginia Tech	4
April 6 - Blacksburg, VA
Army	3
Princeton	0
May 3 - Lawrence, KS
Air Force	13
Principia	9
May 3 - Lawrence, KS
Northern Colorado	3
Kansas	0
April 27 - Dayton, OH
Illinois	8
Ohio State	3
April 27 - Dayton, OH
Minnesota	8
Xavier	3

Regional Final
April 27 - Stanford, CA
California	18
California State Long Beach	10
April 6 - Blacksburg, VA
Navy	12
Army	6
May 4 - Lawrence, KS
Air Force	11
Northern Colorado	10
April 27 - Dayton, OH
Illinois	7
Minnesota	6

National Semifinal
May 17 – Davenport, IA
California (Pacific)	15
Navy (East)	0
May 17 – Davenport, IA
Air Force (West)	15
Illinois (Midwest)	4

National Final
May 18 – Davenport, IA
California	15
Air Force	9
Third place
May 18 – Davenport, IA
Illinois	10
Navy	0

== Semifinals ==
The semifinals scheduled for 1:00 and 3:00PM respectively were delayed an hour and a half due to storms flooding the pitch requiring another field to be set up by the organizers.

17 May 1980
2:30 PM

California	15–0	Navy
Try: Tim O'Brien 25' c Mark Deaton 70' c Con: Mick Luckhurst (2/2); Pen: Mick Luckhurst 10'

Credit Island
Referee: Chuck Erhart (Texas RU)

17 May 1980
4:30 PM

Air Force	15–4	Illinois
Try: Mark Roling 30'; Steve Miller 38'; Art Smith; Pen: Tom Jones 52'		Try: Pete McHugh 89'

Credit Island
Referee: Jim Russell (Eastern Rockies Union)

== Third place ==
18 May 1980
10:00 AM

Illinois	10–0	Navy
Try: Bruce Anderson; Drop: Brian Mullery; McSweeney

Credit Island
Referee: Jim Russell (Eastern Rockies Union)

== Final ==
18 May 1980
1:15 PM

California	15–9	Air Force
Try: Mark Deaton c Con: Mick Luckhurst; Pen: Mick Luckhurst 72', 75'; Drop: Mick Luckhurst 77'		Try: Bruce Stark 39' c Con: Tom Jones; Pen: Joe Motz 15'

Credit Island
Attendance: 200
Referee: Peter Jones (Midsouth RU)

All Tournament Team
Matthew Aylward (Navy) – Prop
Mark Deaton (California) – #8
Jeff Freeman (Navy) – Wing
Mick Luckhurst (California) – Fullback
Herb McMillan (Navy) – Flanker
Brian McNabb (Air Force) – Wing
Joe Motz (Air Force) – Scrumhalf
Brian Mullery (Illinois) – Flyhalf
Tim O'Brian (California) – Outside Center
Doug Raisch (California) – Prop
Jeff Ruckman (Illinois) – Flanker
James Sears (Illinois) – Hooker
Bradley Smith (Navy) – Lock
Bruce Sorensen (California) – Lock
Bruce Stark (Air Force) – Inside Center

== See also ==
- 1980 National Rugby Championships
