= Tony Pacheco (disambiguation) =

Tony Pacheco may refer to:

- Tony Pacheco (1927–1987), American baseball scout
- Tony Pacheco (rugby), American rugby coach

== See also ==
- Antonio Pacheco (disambiguation)
