= Colin Hawley =

American rugby union player

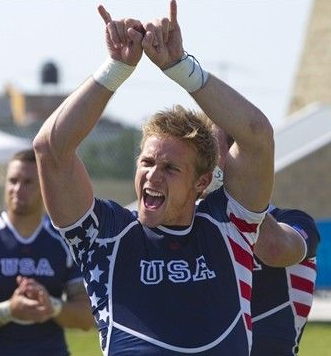
- Hawley at the Pan-American Games
- Born: April 10, 1987 (age 39) East Nicolaus, California, U.S.
- Height: 6 ft 3 in (1.91 m)
- Weight: 215 lb (98 kg)
- Occupation: Professional Rugby Union Player

Rugby union career
- Position: Wing
Amateur team(s)
| Years | Team | Apps | (Points) |
| 2014 | Olympic Club RFC | | |
International career
| Years | Team | Apps | (Points) |
| 2009—2012 | United States | 7 | (5) |
National sevens team
| Years | Team | | Comps |
| 2009–2013 | United States | | 27 |
- Correct as of 10 April 2020

Colin Hawley (born April 10, 1987, in Trowbridge, California) is an American former rugby union wing.

Hawley was brought into the USA Eagles Player Pool, and began playing for the US national team while he was still in college. He made his test debut against Georgia in June 2009. He also played with the USA national rugby union team on their 2010 Autumn tour. Hawley played for the US National Team in the 2011 Rugby World Cup.

Hawley has played with the US national sevens team in several tournaments. Hawley signed a contract to play for the US national rugby sevens team in January 2012, and had been a full-time player under contract for the US since then.

== Youth and college rugby ==
Hawley grew up in East Nicolaus, a rural area outside Sacramento, California. He attended Jesuit High School (Sacramento), playing both rugby and basketball. He was mentored by teammate Louis Stanfill.

Hawley was named to the Collegiate All-Americans (2007–2010) and team MVP (2007) while playing for the University of California Golden Bears which won the NCAA Rugby National Championship in 2010. Hawley played for Cal in the 2010 Collegiate Rugby Championship, helping lead the team to the finals, and was selected to the All-Tournament Team.

Hawley graduated from the University of California, Berkeley, in 2010 with a degree in Political Science.

== Post rugby career ==
Hawley serves as legislative director for Greg Wallis a republican California state assembly member.

== Family ==
Colin's father Loren Hawley, who died in April 2008 due to throat cancer, was also a rugby player for the California Golden Bears from 1962–1965. In speaking of his father during a 2009 interview, Hawley said, "I went to Jesuit and played rugby because my dad and all his friends played at Cal. From there he was my personal rugby guru. He couldn’t talk so he would write pages of notes on his take of the game and what I needed to do. After every game he would come over and ask me what I thought, then he would give his insights. He was a great teacher and coach." Hawley's mother, Rita Currie, is from Phoenix, AZ. Hawley has a brother Garrett, who played for the San Francisco Golden Gate under-23 side. Colin also has a half brother named Jason Everitt.

== Competition history ==
- 2008 – Center/Fullback for California Golden Bears rugby in international collegiate matches in New Zealand
- 2008 – Center/Fullback for California Golden Bears rugby in the collegiate rugby national championship
- 2009 – Wing in USA Eagles Test
- 2009 – Wing for USA Eagles in the Churchill Cup in Denver, Colorado. He scored a try in his debut at the tournament.
- 2010 – Center/Fullback for California Golden Bears rugby in the collegiate rugby national championship against the BYU Rugby team
- 2010 – Wing for USA Sevens in Taiwan
- 2011 – Wing for USA Sevens at the Pan American Games in Guadalajara, Mexico
- 2011 – Wing for USA Eagles in the Churchill Cup in England, where he scored a try against Uruguay.
- 2011 – Wing for USA Eagles at the 2011 Rugby World Cup in New Zealand. He made his debut against Australia.
- 2011 – Wing for the USA Sevens in the Sevens tournament, where he scored a try against Portugal.

== See also ==
- United States national rugby sevens team
- United States at the Rugby World Cup
- Collegiate Rugby Championship
- California Golden Bears rugby
