= 1996 National Collegiate Rugby Championship =

Tournament details
- Tournament format(s): Knockout
- Date: April 20 – May 5, 1995

Tournament statistics
- Teams: 16
- Matches played: 16

Final
- Venue: Colorado Springs, CO
- Champions: UC Berkeley (13th title)
- Runners-up: Penn State

The 1996 National Collegiate Rugby Championship was the seventeenth edition of the official national championship for intercollegiate rugby. The Men's tournament expanded to sixteen teams with four primary pools of four teams at different locations from April 20–21. Pool A and B took place at Palo Alto, CA while Pool C and D were held in Baltimore, MD. The winners of each pool advanced to the final four which took place at the Air Force Academy in Colorado Springs from May 4–5. UC Berkeley won their thirteenth title with a victory over Penn State.

== Venues ==
California
Maloney Field	1996 National Collegiate Rugby Championship is located in California
Palo Alto, CA	1996 National Collegiate Rugby Championship is located in California
Capacity: 2,952	1996 National Collegiate Rugby Championship is located in California

Maryland
Calvert Hall	1996 National Collegiate Rugby Championship is located in Maryland
Baltimore, MD	1996 National Collegiate Rugby Championship is located in Maryland
Capacity: 2500	1996 National Collegiate Rugby Championship is located in Maryland

Colorado
AF Academy	1996 National Collegiate Rugby Championship is located in Colorado
Colorado Springs, Colorado	1996 National Collegiate Rugby Championship is located in Colorado
Capacity:	1996 National Collegiate Rugby Championship is located in Colorado

== Participants ==
The regional unions were each allocated one to three spots. Northeast had three teams (Brown, Cornell, Army), Pacific Coast three teams (UC Berkeley, Stanford, UC Davis), West three teams (Northeast Missouri, Air Force, Virginia Tech), Mid–Atlantic two teams (Navy, Kutztown State), Midwest two teams (Penn State, Ohio State), Southern California two teams (San Diego State, UC Santa Barbara), and Southeast one team (Clemson). The teams were split between East and West sections and seeded one through eight for each section. Each section was split into two 4–team pools. The winner of each pool advanced to the final four.

West seeds
1. Pacific Coast I (UC Berkeley)
2. West I (Northeast Missouri)
3. Pacific Coast II (Stanford)
4. Southern California I (San Diego State)
5. West II (Air Force)
6. Southern California II (UC Santa Barbara)
7. Pacific Coast III (UC Davis)
8. West III (Virginia Tech)

East seeds
1. Midwest I (Penn State)
2. Northeast I (Brown)
3. Mid–Atlantic I (Navy)
4. Southeast I (Clemson)
5. Northeast II (Cornell)
6. Midwest II (Ohio State)
7. Northeast III (Army)
8. Mid–Atlantic II (Kutztown State)

== Sweet Sixteen ==
=== Pool A ===
Semifinals

20 April 1996
1:00PM

1 UC Berkeley	37–0	8 Virginia Tech

Palo Alto, CA

20 April 1996
11:00AM

4 San Diego State	32–35	5 Air Force

Palo Alto, CA

Final

21 April 1996
1:00PM

1 UC Berkeley	52–23	5 Air Force
Try: Ted Callagy 12' c Vinh Phan 26', 55'; Kevin Dalzell 1H' c, 33'; Khasigian; Todd Conneely; Joseph Motes; Con: Kevin Dalzell; Pen: Katsuhito Takei 1H', 44'		Try: Jason Mock c Grayling Jones 58'; Julian Stephens; Con: Brad Turpen; Pen: Brad Turpen 29', 1H'

Palo Alto, CA
Referee: Bruce Carter (Pacific Coast)

=== Pool B ===
Semifinals

20 April 1996
3:00PM

2 Northeast Missouri	23–41	7 UC Davis

Palo Alto, CA

20 April 1996
3:00PM

3 Stanford	31–19	6 UC Santa Barbara
Try: 4 Con: David Warter (4); Pen: David Warter (1)		Try: 3 Con: 2

Palo Alto, CA

Final

21 April 1996
3:00PM

3 Stanford	37–18	7 UC Davis
Try: Bobby Blunt 6' c Jared Hopkins 60' c, 78', 80'+ Jeremy Tower 75'; Con: Dave Warter; Pen: Dave Warter 40'+, 70'		Try: Jim Brown 26'; Scott Lopker 54'; Dan Orton 80'; Pen: Scott Lopker

Palo Alto, CA
Referee: Peter Buckley (Pac Northwest

=== Pool C ===
Semifinals

20 April 1996
11:00AM

1 Penn State	45–10	8 Kutztown State

Baltimore, MD

20 April 1996
11:00AM

4 Clemson	28–5	5 Cornell

Baltimore, MD

Final

21 April 1996
11:00AM

1 Penn State	28–16	4 Clemson
Try: Brian Anson 9'; Andrew Lacey c, 73'; Wayne Whitko 50'; Paul Sochocky; Con: Wayne Whitko; Pen: Wayne Whitko 6', 2H'		Try: Tyson Campbell 19' c Spacil 59'; Pen: Mundell 29'; Drop: Mundell 2'

Baltimore, MD
Referee: Dave Kimber

=== Pool D ===
Semifinals

20 April 1996
11:00AM

2 Brown	14–43	7 Army
Try: penalty try 1H' c Shoom–Kirsch 2H' c		Try: 2 Con: 1

Baltimore, MD

20 April 1996
11:00AM

3 Navy	59–14	6 Ohio State

Baltimore, MD

Final

21 April 1996
11:00AM

3 Navy	31–20	7 Army
Try: J.J. Ethridge 13' c Todd Bruemer 27'; Owen Voelker 51' c Con: Todd Bruemer; Pen: Todd Bruemer 12', 18', 30', 34'		Try: Justin Pelkey c Eric Harmon c Con: Jason Jefferis; Pen: Jason Jefferis 20', 42'

Baltimore, MD
Referee: Pete Hesler

== Final Four ==
=== Semifinals ===
4 May 1996
11:00AM

1 UC Berkeley	32–15	3 Navy
Try: Scott Yungling 9', 49' c David Stroble 1H', 73'; Katsuhito Takei 64' c Con: Kevin Dalzell; Pen: Kevin Dalzell 23'		Try: Owen Voelker 29' c Jarod Allen 79'; Con: Todd Bruemer; Pen: Todd Bruemer 14'

Colorado Springs, CO
Referee: Dave Hooper

4 May 1996
1:00PM

1 Penn State	42–29	3 Stanford
Try: Kurt Shuman 1H' c, 2H' c Brian Anson c, 75' c Todd Buelow 80'+ Con: Wayne Whitko; Pen: Wayne Whitko 6', 20', 2H'		Try: Jared Hopkins 11', 60' c Tim Yarnall 16' c Dave Warter c Con: Dave Warter; Pen: Dave Warter 45'

Colorado Springs, CO
Referee: Ed Sorenson

=== Third place ===
5 May 1996
11:00 AM

Stanford	34–15	Navy
Try: 7'; 10' c R.J. DeLee (2); Chris Grasso; Bobby Blunt		Try: Sean Donovan 13', 49'

Colorado Springs, CO
Referee: G. Andrews

=== Final ===
5 May 1996
1:00PM

UC Berkeley	47–6	Penn State
Try: Kevin Dalzell 16', 37'; Eric Roof 22', 66' c David Stroble; Joseph Motes 51'; Scott Yungling 61'; Mason Foster 78'; Con: Kevin Dalzell; Pen: Kevin Dalzell 2'; Drop: Kevin Dalzell		Pen: Wayne Whitko 7', 30'

Colorado Springs, CO
Referee: Ed Sorenson

Champions:University of California Berkeley
Coach- Jack Clark
Captains-Jayson Davidson (Hooker), Kevin Dalzell (Scrumhalf)
Roster– Chris Andrews (Fullback), Douglas Anthrop (Wing/Center), Tyler Applegate (Wing/Center), Benjamin Arreguy (Prop), Theodore Callagy (Prop), Christopher Carver (Flyhalf), Todd Conneely (Wing), Byron Deeter (Prop), Sam Enochian (Lock), Robert Flegel (Lock), Mason Foster (Prop), Jonah Holmes (Lock), Brett Kennedy (#8), Kirk Khasigian (Flanker), Brian Libicki (Center), Christian Masters (Scrumhalf), Deron McElroy (Center), Joseph Motes (Flyhalf), Jason Perry (Hooker), Vinh Phan (Center), Eric Roof (Center), Nicholas Sliffe (Wing), David Stroble (Wing), Pete Morales (Flanker), Joe Motes (Flyhalf), Jason Perry (Hooker), Shap Roder (Flanker), Eric Roof (Center), Katsukito Takei (Fullback), John Taylor (Flanker), Simon Terry–Lloyd (Flanker), Chris Varnell (Lock), Scott Yungling (#8).

== Women's College Championship ==
The 1996 Women's Collegiate Championship expanded to an Elite Eight and took place at Colorado Springs, CO from May 3–5. Princeton was the repeat champion of this edition. Penn State #8 Jen Sikora was named MVP Forward of the tournament and Princeton scrumhalf Susan Welgos was MVP Back.

=== Participants ===
Princeton University and Virginia Tech qualified by placing first and second respectively at the Mid–Atlantic Territorial championship November 11–12. Penn State and St. Benedict qualified by placing first and second respectively at the Midwest Territorial . Air Force represented the West. Central Washington won the Pacific Coast championship against Stanford and Reed at Portland, OR from 13 to 14 April. Radcliffe College was the Northeast representative. Florida State represented the Southeast. The seeding was 1. Mid–Atlantic #1 (Princeton), 2. Midwest #1 (Penn State), 3. West (Air Force), 4. Pacific (Central Washington), 5. Northeast (Radcliffe), 6. Mid–Atlantic #2 (Virginia Tech), 7. Southeast (Florida State), 8. Midwest #2 (St. Benedict).

=== Quarterfinals ===
3 May 1996
10:00AM

1 Princeton	41–0	8 St. Benedict
Try: Susie Welgos; Erin Kennedy; Isabel Tremblay; Anna Sinaiko

Colorado Springs, CO

3 May 1996
2:00PM

2 Penn State	87–0	7 Florida State
Try: Megan Brown

Colorado Springs, CO

3 May 1996
4:00PM

3 Air Force	53–0	6 Virginia Tech
Try: Nicki Harris (2); Shalandra Baker (2); Mel Davidson (2)

Colorado Springs, CO

3 May 1996
12:00PM

4 Central Washington	0–27	5 Radcliffe
Try: Bex Wallison; Maggie Hatcher; Sarah Schooler; Emily Yee

Colorado Springs, CO

Consolation semifinals
Central Washington 22–0 St. Benedict
Virginia Tech 15–0 Florida State

Seventh place
Florida State 10–5(OT) St. Benedict

Fifth place
Central Washington 8–3 Virginia Tech

=== Semifinals ===
4 May 1996
10:00AM

1 Princeton	14–10	5 Radcliffe
Try: Stephanie Gazdo c Caroline Gibson c Con: Susie Welgos		Try: Kelly Gilbride 25'; Bex Wallison

Colorado Springs, CO
Referee: Gary Andrews

4 May 1996
2:00PM

2 Penn State	14–3	3 Air Force
Try: Kim Fahie; Pen: Megan Brown (2)		Pen: Marika Barto

Colorado Springs, CO
Referee: Woerner

=== Third place ===
5 May 1996
10:50AM

Air Force	12–7	Radcliffe
Try: Kerre Ellis c Marika Barto 79'; Con: Marika Barto		Try: Maggie Hatcher c Con: Bex Wallison

Colorado Springs, CO

=== Final ===
5 May 1996
12:00PM

Princeton	20–12	Penn State
Try: Kristine Leporati 23'; Laura Engler 36' c Caroline Gibson 50'; Con: Susie Welgos; Pen: Susie Welgos 10'		Try: Gwenn Heintz 20'; Jen Sikora 66' c Con: Brown

Colorado Springs, CO
Referee: Martin Brown (ERRFU)

Champions: Princeton Tigers
Coach: Brian Kraybill
Captain: Erin Kennedy (Flyhalf), Ashley Kline (Flanker)
Roster: Pamela Adams (Lock), Laura Bartels (Lock), Meredith Bell (Prop), Sarah Briggs (Flanker), Tracy Dubovick (Prop), Valerie Easterwood (Flanker), Laura Engler (Center), Dahlia Fetouh (Hooker), Stephanie Gazdo (Fulllback), Caroline Gibson (Center), Amy Gresh (#8), Alison Gruen (Wing), Mary Angela Knighton (Center), Lara Larson (#8), Ann Marie Lavigne (Lock), Kristine Leporati (Wing), Rachel Liberatore (Prop), Margaret Mudge (Center), Julia Ott (Lock), Megan Sarnecki (Lock), Anna Sinai (Wing), Karina Tellefsen (Prop), Isabel Tremblay (Flanker), Alexandra Van Dusen (Hooker), Susan Welgos (Scrumhalf), Valerie Zimmer (Wing).

== College All–Stars ==
The 1996 National Collegiate All–Star Championship included seven teams and took place at Ohio State University in Columbus, OH from June 8–9. Similar to the All–Star Tournaments for club teams, the college competition is divided into geographic unions and used to select the All–American team that goes on to play other junior national rugby teams. The Pacific Coast All–Stars came in first, Midwest was second, Northeast third and Mid–Atlantic fourth.
