= Varsity Cup Championship =

Varsity Cup
- Sport: Rugby union
- Inaugural season: 2013
- Ceased: 2017 (post-season)
- Number of teams: 16
- Country: United States
- Holders: Cal (2017)
- Most titles: Cal and BYU (2 titles each)
- Website: varsitycup.us
- Broadcast partner: NBC Sports

The Varsity Cup Championship was an American college rugby competition established in 2012 to serve as an invitational championship following the breakaway of several schools from Division 1-A Rugby.

The Varsity Cup was organized by United World Sport, the organization which also ran the USA Sevens tournament and the Collegiate Rugby Championship. The 2014 Varsity Cup final was televised by NBC Sports on NBCSN. The Varsity Cup's ability to get onto television was seen as a boost to the Varsity Cup and to the rugby programs of the member schools.

The development of the Varsity Cup post-season tournament created some controversy. The Varsity Cup Championship did not replace Division 1-A Rugby, but it was endorsed by USA Rugby. The schools participating in the Varsity Cup often referred to it as the national championship, but with the rival Division 1-A Rugby post-season tournament running concurrently, USA Rugby did not consider the Varsity Cup to be the national championship.

The founding schools formed the Varsity Cup with a number of goals in mind. One was the ability to manage and control their playoff games. Another was to develop a tournament with commercial appeal, that would generate revenue from attendance and concessions, and that would generate marketing exposure through TV coverage.

The Varsity Cup folded in November 2017 when the organizer, broadcast partner and a major sponsor, Penn Mutual, withdrew their support.

== Teams ==
The teams invited to compete in the Varsity Cup were from schools where rugby enjoyed varsity status or advanced club status.

Team	School's Endowment	School's NCAA Affiliation	Joined V-Cup	Head coach	Rugby Since	Best VC Result
Air Force	$28 m	Mountain West	2013–2016	Denny Merideth	1969	QF (2013)
Arizona State	$553 m	Pac-12	2015–2016	Gary Lane	1975	R16 (2015, 2016)
Arkansas State	$43 m	Sun Belt Conf.	2015–2017	Mani Delaibatiki	1991	2nd (2017)
Army West Point	$284 m	Patriot League	2016–2017	Matt Sherman	1961	QF (2016, 2017)
Boston College			2017			R16 (2017)
BYU	$957 m	West Coast	2013–2016	David Smyth	1965	1st (2013, 2014)
Cal	$3.0 bn	Pac-12	2013–2017	Jack Clark	1882	1st (2016, 2017)
Central Washington	$13 m	Great Northwest	2013–2017	Tony Pacheco	1972	SF (2013, 2014, 2015, 2016)
Clemson	$483 m	ACC	2014–2017	Steve Lynch	1967	QF (2015, 2017)
Dartmouth	$3.7 bn	Ivy League	2013–2017	Gavin Hickie	1951	QF (2013, 2014, 2016)
Harvard		Ivy League	2017			R16 (2017)
Navy	???	Patriot League	2013–2017	Mike Flanagan	1963	SF (2013, 2014, 2015)
Notre Dame	$8.3 bn	ACC	2013–2017	Justin Hickey	1961	QF (2013)
Oklahoma	$1.2 bn	Big 12	2014–2017	Doug Neubauer	1974	R16 (2014, 2016, 2017)
Penn State	$3.0 bn	Big 10	2016–2017	James Willocks	1962	R16 (2016)
Texas	$6.0 bn	Big 12	2014–2016	Chris Hopps	1985	QF (2014, 2015)
UCLA	$2.6 bn	Pac-12	2013–2017	Scott Stewart	1934	QF (2013, 2014, 2015)
Utah	$670 m	Pac-12	2014–2016	Paul Benson	???	QF (2014, 2015, 2016)
Utah Valley			2017			QF (2017)

- Utah was supposed to be one of the eight teams participating in the 2013 inaugural Varsity Cup, but the Utah rugby team was suspended by the school, with Central Washington replacing Utah in the 2013 Varsity Cup.
- Arkansas State committed in 2014 to join the Varsity Cup beginning in 2015, in significant part due to the ability of the tournament to improve the name recognition of the school's rugby program.
- Arizona State joined the Varsity Cup in 2015 to increase the prowess of their Olympic athletes. Soon after their coach was fired following a lawsuit in which it was revealed that an ineligible athlete assaulted an opponent. No criminal charges against Lane were filed and all civil litigation was settled out of court.
- Oklahoma was supposed to participate in the 2015 Varsity Cup but had to forfeit their scheduled match vs. Utah due to the use of ineligible players.

== Results ==
=== Summary ===
Date	Champion	Final score	Runner up	Broadcast	Attendance	Location	Stadium	Other Semifinalists
May 4, 2013	BYU	27–24	Cal	YouTube	3,000	Provo, UT	BYU's South Field	CWU, Navy
May 3, 2014	BYU	43–33	Cal	NBCSN	10,172	Salt Lake City, UT	Rio Tinto Stadium	CWU, Navy
May 2, 2015	~~BYU~~	30–27	Cal	NBCSN	9,033	Salt Lake City, UT	Rio Tinto Stadium	CWU, Navy
May 7, 2016	Cal	40–29	BYU	NBCSN		Provo, UT	BYU's South Field	CWU, Ark. St.
May 6, 2017	Cal	43–13	Arkansas State	NBCSN		Santa Clara, CA	Stevens Stadium	Penn State, Navy

Note: BYU's 2015 victory was vacated because BYU fielded an ineligible player. Upon the discovery and further questions of the usage of ineligible players by BYU, the team left the Varsity Cup and rejoined D1-A.

=== 2013 ===
Quarterfinals (April 20)
1	BYU	69
8	UCLA	8
4	Central Washington	81
5	Air Force	28
2	California	77
7	Notre Dame	0
3	Dartmouth	0
6	Navy	32

Semifinals (April 27)
1	BYU	53
4	Central Washington	20
2	California	74
6	Navy	6

Final (May 4)
1	BYU	27
2	California	24

=== 2014 ===
Regionals (April 12)
Dartmouth	59
Clemson	24
Texas	55
Notre Dame	33
Oklahoma	12
UCLA	77
Utah	71
Air Force	24

Super Regionals (April 19)
BYU	70
Dartmouth	15
Navy	64
Texas	10
California	41
UCLA	0
Central Washington	25
Utah	24

Semifinals (April 26)
BYU	60
Navy	0
California	58
Central Washington	14

Final (May 3)
BYU	43
California	33

=== 2015 ===
Regionals (April 4)
UCLA	32
Air Force	12
Utah	1
Oklahoma	0
Central Washington	72
Arizona State	10
Texas	22
Notre Dame	17
Clemson	26
Arkansas State	22
Dartmouth	22
Navy	23

Super Regionals (April 11)
BYU	45
UCLA	16
Utah	7
Central Washington	18
California	100
Texas	7
Clemson	23
Navy	24

Semifinals (April 18)
BYU	35
Central Washington	8
California	57
Navy	15

Final (May 2) (NBCSN)
~~BYU~~	~~30~~
California	27

Note: BYU's 2015 victory was vacated because BYU fielded an ineligible player.

=== 2016 ===
1st Round (April 9)
BYU	113
Arizona State	8
Penn State	25
Dartmouth	30
Clemson	0
Arkansas State	50
Notre Dame	3
Navy	57
Texas	0
California	138
Oklahoma	10
Army West Point	55
UCLA	15
Central Washington	44
Air Force	31
Utah	36

Quarterfinals (April 16)
BYU	75
Dartmouth	15
Arkansas State	31
Navy	24
California	41
Army West Point	29
Central Washington	58
Utah	5

Semifinals (April 23)
BYU	68
Arkansas State	20
California	14
Central Washington	13

Championship (May 7); NBCSN
BYU	29
California	40

Italicized teams hosted each round.

=== 2017 ===
1st Round (April 8)
–	Clemson	36
8	Dartmouth	29
4	Army West Point	41
–	Notre Dame	8
–	Harvard	7
5	Penn State	100
7	Navy	64
–	Boston College	14
6	UCLA	14
–	Utah Valley	40
–	Oklahoma	7
3	Arkansas State	69

Quarterfinals (April 15)
1	California	71
–	Clemson	5
4	Army West Point	34
5	Penn State	47
2	Central Washington	24
7	Navy	27
–	Utah Valley	12
3	Arkansas State	39

Semifinals (April 22)
1	California	35
5	Penn State	14
7	Navy	7
3	Arkansas State	25

Championship (May 6); NBCSN
1	California	43
3	Arkansas State	13

Italicized teams hosted each round.

== Records ==
Most points for one team (single match):

1. 136 — California vs Texas (2016)
2. 113 — BYU vs Arizona State (2016)
3. 100 — California vs Texas (2015)
4. 100 — Penn State vs Harvard (2017)

== List of broadcasters ==
The following table shows the broadcasters for each year's final match.

Year	TV Network	Play-by-play announcers	Color commentators	Sideline reporters
2013	YouTube	Brian Hightower	Salesi Sika	
2014	NBCSN	Todd Harris	Brian Hightower	Marty Snider
2015	NBCSN	Todd Harris	Brian Hightower	Marty Snider
2016	NBCSN	Bill Seward	Brian Hightower	Tanith White
2017	NBCSN			

== See also ==
- Division 1-A Rugby
- Collegiate Rugby Championship
- Intercollegiate sports team champions
