= America First Credit Union =

Credit union based in Riverdale, Utah

- Type: Credit union
- Industry: Financial services
- Founded: 1939; 87 years ago
- Headquarters: Riverdale, Utah, U.S.
- Area served: Western United States
- Products: Savings; checking; consumer loans; mortgages; credit cards
- Total assets: $11.7B USD (2020)
- Website: www.americafirst.com

America First Credit Union is a federally chartered credit union headquartered in Riverdale, Utah, United States. As of December 2023, America First was the fifth largest credit union in the United States in terms of total membership and seventh largest credit union in assets in the U.S.

== Description ==
As of December 2023, America First has 124 branch locations, more than 1 million members, and has over USD 19.35 billion in assets. America First is also a member of the CO-OP Network of ATMs which provides its members free ATM access to the network's almost 30,000 ATMs nationwide.

Eligibility for membership at America First is open to anyone who lives, works, worships, attends school, conducts business, or volunteers in any counties or cities within their field of membership in Utah, Idaho, Oregon, New Mexico, Arizona, Nevada and California. Eligibility is also open to all those who live within a 12-mile radius of the post office in Mesquite, Nevada, immediate family or household members of an existing member, as well as owners, employees, suppliers and their employees, or associated companies and their employees involved in the food industry, an affiliated association, or select employee group in the state of Utah.

== History ==
America First Credit Union was founded on March 16, 1939. It was established at Fort Douglas in Salt Lake City, Utah after 59 members of the National Federation of Federal Employees, Local No. 650, instituted the Fort Douglas Civilian Employees Credit Union. On June 23, 1947, the finance office of the U.S. Army at Fort Douglas was moved to the Utah General Distribution Depot in Ogden, Utah, and the credit union moved with it and renamed itself Federal Employees Credit Union. In 1960, with the addition of the Naval Supply Depot in Clearfield, Utah, the credit union was now affiliated with five Federal Government installations, the others being the Utah General Depot, Hill Air Force Base, Fort Douglas and the Internal Revenue Service Building in Ogden, Utah. Utah-chartered credit unions began serving anyone in the state and the credit union changed its name to America First Credit Union in 1984. This is the year when the credit union opened its membership to the public.

In 1994, it marketed residential mortgages with incentives such as no fees for first mortgage refinancing, a quarter-point reduction in the interest rate if payments were to be deducted automatically from an America First checking account, and a quarter-point reduction for mortgages of less than half the residence's appraised value.

Beginning in 1998, a series of legal and legislative restrictions were placed on America First Credit Union's field of membership and its ability to make business loans. In 2003, America First became federally chartered to protect its membership and serve its business members. In 2004, it opened its first branch in Summit County, Utah, since the federal charter allows it to serve that county as well.

In 2005, it announced that it would offer Small Business Administration loans to its members. In 2007, the credit union, many of whose members serve in the military, hosted Operation Best Wishes.

On August 12, 2009, America First acquired Las Vegas-based Community One Federal Credit Union following its closure by the National Credit Union Administration.

In June 2018, America First announced it would be merging with the Arizona based Altier Credit Union, expanding to include Maricopa County within America First's field of membership.

In November 2019, America First announced it would be merging with the Utah County based City Center Credit Union.

On March 14, 2022, America First opened its first branch in the state of New Mexico, following its approval to add several counties and cities in New Mexico to its field of membership in 2020.

On June 12, 2024, America First merged with the California-based 1st Valley Credit Union, expanding its field of membership to include San Bernardino County.

=== Sponsorships ===
America First sponsors a number of athletic entities in Utah. The credit union acquired naming rights to America First Event Center in Cedar City, America First Field in Sandy, The Ballpark at America First Square in South Jordan, and America First Ballpark at the University of Utah in Salt Lake City. America First is also the shirt sponsor of the National Women's Soccer League's Utah Royals.

== Technology ==
In 1999, the credit union used Novell's NetWare.

In 2001, it began to offer wireless banking to its members using technology from SensCom Inc.

In 2006, it agreed to adopt Oracle Corporation's Siebel Branch Teller application to capture check information at the teller's terminal.

== Field of membership ==
America First Credit Union is approved by the National Credit Union Administration to accept members who live, work, regularly conduct business, worship, volunteer, or attend school in the following areas:

State	Areas	Notes
Arizona	Counties: Maricopa, Mohave Other Areas: Page, Pima, St. Johns	
California	Counties: San Bernardino	
Idaho	Counties: Bannock, Bear Lake, Bingham, Bonneville, Boise, Canyon, Caribou, Clark, Elmore, Franklin, Gem, Jefferson, Madison, Owyhee, Power	
Nevada	Counties: Churchill, Clark, Douglas, Esmeralda, Lincoln, Lyon, Mineral, Nye, Storey, Washoe Other Areas: Carson City	
New Mexico	Counties: Bernalillo, Chaveso, De Baca, Guadalupe, Harding, Mora, Quay, Sandoval, San Miguel, Santa Fe, Torrance, Valencia	
Oregon	Counties: Malheur	
Utah	Counties: Cache, Davis, Iron, Juab, Rich, Salt Lake, Utah, Washington, Weber	Additionally, owners, employees, suppliers and their employees, or associated companies and their employees involved in the food industry, in Utah also qualify.

== See also ==
- America First Event Center, an indoor arena at Southern Utah University sponsored by the credit union
- America First Field, a soccer stadium in the Salt Lake City suburb of Sandy also sponsored by the credit union
- America First Center in Henderson, practice facility for the Henderson Silver Knights of the American Hockey League, in Henderson Nevada
