= Community One Federal Credit Union =

American credit union

- Company type: Credit union
- Industry: Financial services
- Founded: 1960
- Defunct: 2009
- Headquarters: Las Vegas, Nevada, United States
- Number of locations: 5
- Area served: Clark County, Nevada
- Products: Savings; checking; consumer loans; mortgages; credit cards
- Total assets: $159 million (at 2009 close)
- Number of employees: 66

Community One Federal Credit Union was a Las Vegas, Nevada based state chartered credit union.

America First Federal Credit Union acquired Community One Federal Credit Union on August 12, 2009, following its closure by the National Credit Union Administration. At the time of closing, the credit union served 21,098 members. Community One was the second credit union to close in Clark County, Nevada, during 2009.

== Failure ==
The credit union failed following extensive losses driven by the local economic problems.
