= BYU Cougars women's rugby =

US women's rugby union club, based in Provo, Utah

(United States) BYU Women's Rugby
- Full name: Brigham Young University Women's Rugby
- Union: USA Rugby
- Nickname: Cougars
- Founded: 1999–2000
- Location: Provo, Utah
- Ground(s): South Field & Helaman Field (Capacity: 5000)
- Coach(es): Head Coach: Tom Waqa (2004-2022); Assistant Coaches: Sia Skipps (2020-present), Kisa Kalougata (2016-present)
- Captain(s): Kathryn Stowers, Annaliese Curtis (2020-2021)
- League: USA Rugby Women's DI College Championship Series
Team kit

Official website
- extramuralsports.byu.edu/womensrugby

The Brigham Young University Women's Rugby team, formerly known as Women's Cougar Rugby Club, participates in the Pacific Desert Rugby Conference D-I in USA Rugby's Women's College rugby D-I National Championship Series Competition. BYU Women's rugby is a sanctioned team under Extramural Sports programs with the Department of Student Life at Brigham Young University. In May 2016, BYU entered its first national championship final ever as an extramural club on campus in Utah, and came in as runner-up to Penn State in the DI Elite Final. More recently, on May 4, 2019, BYU won its first-ever National Title by defeating Virginia Tech by a score of 48–0, to win the 2019 Spring Women's DI College National Championship that was played at Sportsplex Stadium, Matthews, North Carolina.

== History ==
“Women’s rugby at BYU began in February 2000, when Julia Hobbs, 19, a sophomore from Norman, OK, put up fliers on campus, asking girls interested in playing to call her.” “Over 100 girls called,” Hobbs said. Many have since dropped out or gone home for the summer — only 12 girls remain.” By Emily Bell – NewsNet Staff Writer – 31 May 2000. Women's Cougars rugby tradition lived on; from those 12 dedicated girls to a highly ranked team in the nation today (2019). To this day, BYU Women's rugby team maintains an average roster of 45 female students.

== Early years ==
The Brigham Young University women's rugby team was founded by Shane Seggar, who is the son of John Seggar. John previously founded the BYU men's rugby team when he was a student at BYU in 1962. Coach Shane Seggar moved on from coaching in 2003, and John Seggar took over as head coach from 2000 to 2004. Coach Tom Waqa was given the reigns by the team's committee as head coach of the unofficial team, Women's Cougar Rugby from 2004 until it became an official Extramural Sport on October 8, 2015.

On October 28, 2015, Tom Waqa was selected as the new Women's rugby coach of the BYU Women's rugby team.

== Post-season absence ==
Prior to 2007, the National Collegiate Tournament changed the schedule of playing from Friday-Saturday to Saturday-Sunday. This change in schedule and the women's rugby team's affiliation with the Church of Jesus Christ of Latter-day Saints kept them from competing for a national championship because they would not compete on Sundays. Over the next few years, BYU Rugby continued to participate in regular season matches, but they participated in no post-season.

== National Championship Series ==
In 2008, USA Rugby returned women's rugby post-season tournament play to a Friday-Saturday format, and BYU women's rugby began playing under USA Rugby Collegiate Tournaments after a successful petition that granted Women's Cougar rugby club a waiver to participate in USA College rugby.

== 2010 Sunday forfeit ==
The women on Brigham Young University's club rugby team made National News on April 16, 2010, when during their quarterfinal match which was scheduled on Sunday, due to an oversight by USA Rugby Competitions Committee, decided to forfeit the national college playoff that weekend in Florida. The Cougars advanced that far in last year's tournament, losing to Penn State, the eventual champion. The team was ranked sixth in Division I and had a good shot. The Cougars defeated Wisconsin-Milwaukee 46–7 on Saturday, however, B.Y.U. did not advance past the Round of 16 that weekend. All 35 team members of the team are Mormons, and because USA Rugby scheduled that round on Sunday, the team decided to forfeit the Sunday game against Penn State.

== Results ==
BYU women's rugby has had several successful seasons. In this past 2008 - 2016 seasons, BYU women's rugby has fought to the top seat in the state of Utah rugby, and are highly ranked in the Nation.

Season	Post-season Tournament	Tournament Finish	National Ranking	Ref
2008	Pac Coast Rugby Conference Playoff	Rnd 32	5	
2009	National Championship Series	Rnd 8	6	
2010	National Championship Series	Rnd 8 (Forfeit)	4	
2011	National Championship Series	Final 4	3	
2012	National Championship Series	Final 4	3	
2013	National Championship Series	Rnd 8	4	
2014	National Championship Series	Rnd 8	5	
2015	National Spring Championship D-I Elite Series	2nd	3	
2016	National Championship D-I Elite Series	2nd	2	
2017	National Championship D-I Elite Series	3rd	3	
2018	National Championship D-I Elite Series	Final 4	4	
2019	National Championship D-I Spring Series	1st	1	
2020	National Championship D-I Spring Series Cancelled	N/A	N/A	
2021	National Championship DI-Elite Final 4	3rd	3	
2022	National Championship D-I Championship	1st	1	

== Awards ==
- Waqa, Tom - USA Women's Collegiate AA Assistant Coach (2010)
- Waqa, Tom - USA Olympic Committee Volunteer Coach of the Year for Rugby (2011)
- Waqa, Tom - USA Olympic Committee National Volunteer Coach of the Year (2011)
- Gray, Jordan - Rugby Breakdown's College Player of the Year (2016)

== Collegiate All-Americans ==
- Alisa Baker 2020
- Brett Baldry 2008
- Chelsea Merrill 2007
- Ela Wolfgramm 2012
- Emily Briggs 2019, 2020
- Jordan Gray 2011, 2012, 2013, 2014, 2015, 2016
- Kara Remington 2011
- Kathryn Stowers 2018, 2021
- Kayla Ellingson 2008, 2009
- Kayla Richardson 2013, 2015
- Keelia Harker 2009, 2010
- Kirsten Siebach 2007 (HM), 2008, 2009, 2010
- Kristi Jackson 2009, 2010, 2011
- Lewanda Aspinall 2020, 2022
- Meighan Stevens 2013
- Matalasi Morrissette 2019, 2022
- Monica Jackson 2011, 2012, 2013
- Morgan Rovetti 2009
- Nalia Tafua 2013, 2016
- Nicole McCullough 2013, 2014 (HM), 2015, 2016
- Rachel Strasdas 2019, 2020, 2021
- Rebekah Boaz 2013, 2015, 2016
- Rebekah Siebach 2011, 2012, 2013
- Samantha Wright 2011 (HM), 2012
- Sia Skipps 2016
- Star Monson 2010
- Grace Taito 2017, 2018

HM = Honorable Mention

== Notable players ==
The following is a list of BYU Women's rugby players who have played for the United States women's national rugby union team, nicknamed Eagles, in a major international competition.

- Jordan Gray - 2016–present, USA Women's National Team 7s, 2015 CAN-AM Women's Rugby Series, Canada and 2016 Women's Rugby Super Series in Salt Lake City, Utah and November 2016 France Tour.
- Rebekah Boaz Hebdon - USA Women's National Team 15s - November 2016 France Tour.
- Rebekah Siebach - 2013 and 2014 USA Women's 7s Team, World Rugby Women's Sevens Series.
