= David Smyth (rugby union) =

US rugby union coach

David Smyth is the former head coach for the BYU rugby team and current head coach for the Southern Virginia University rugby team. Smyth played for BYU rugby in the 1980s. Smyth coached the BYU rugby team from 1991–2002, and after taking a break, has been the head coach since 2005. BYU rugby claimed its first national championship in 2009, and Smyth was selected as college coach of the year for the 2008–09 season by American Rugby News.

Smyth is one of the architects of the Varsity Cup Championship that was created in 2012. Smyth participated in forming the Varsity Cup out of a desire to create a flagship competition for college rugby where universities would control the playoff structure. Smyth led BYU rugby to the Varsity Cup title in 2013 and again in 2014, beating Cal both times.

== BYU results ==
Smyth has led BYU to several successful seasons, with BYU finishing as the top or one of the top teams in the country in post-season tournaments and in national rankings.

Season	Post-season Tournament	Tournament Finish	National Ranking	Ref
2005	National Championship	SF		
2006	National Championship	2nd		
2007	National Championship	2nd		
2008	National Championship	2nd		
2009	National Championship	1st		
2010	National Championship	2nd		
2011	Division 1-A	2nd	2nd	
2012	Division 1-A	1st	1st	
2013	Varsity Cup	1st	1st	
2014	Varsity Cup	1st	2nd	
2015	Varsity Cup	1st	1st	
