= Matt Sherman =

US international rugby union player

- Born: Matt Sherman; October 29, 1978 (age 48) San Francisco, Illinois, United States
- Height: 5 ft 10 in (1.78 m)
- Weight: 180 lb (82 kg)
- School: Piedmont High School
- University: University of California, Berkeley
- Occupation: Rugby union coach

Rugby union career
- Position: Fly-half
International career
Years	Team	Apps	(Points)
2003–2005	United States	7	(6)
- Correct as of 1 January 2021
Coaching career
- Years: Team
- –: Stanford

Matt Sherman (born October 29, 1978, in San Francisco, California) is a former American rugby union fly-half and current coach of the Army men's rugby team at the United States Military Academy. His ‘21/‘22 Army West Point squad won the D1A National Championship.

== Playing career ==
Sherman played fly-half for the U.S. men's national rugby team from 2003 to 2005, including the 2003 Rugby World Cup. Sherman began playing rugby at Piedmont High School (east SF Bay area). He then played collegiate rugby at Cal, where he was team captain his last 2 years, and a three time Collegiate All-American. During his time playing fly-half for California the Golden Bears won 4 consecutive National Championships. After graduating from Cal, Sherman played in England for Oxford University while earning his master's degree. His coaching career began at Oxford when he was in charge of their Women's squad.

== Coaching career ==
Sherman spent two seasons as San Diego State's head coach, leading the Aztecs to the national semifinals in 2009 and the national quarterfinals in 2010. Sherman then became head coach of the Stanford women's and men's rugby teams. He led the Stanford women's rugby team to a 2nd-place finish in Division I in both 2012 and 2014. In 2015 Sherman was hired by Army West Point, the United States Military Academy. He led the Black Knights to an undefeated fall season and a Rugby East conference championship in 2018. His ‘21/‘22 Army West Point squad finished the season with a 14–1 record, winning the Patriot League title and the D1A National Championship.

Sherman's career also includes coaching positions with the USA Rugby U-18 Junior National Team, the USA Rugby Collegiate All-Americans, and the U.S. senior national team.
