= Antonio Pacheco =

Antonio Pacheco may refer to:

- Tony Pacheco, Cuban-born baseball player, coach and scout
- Antonio Pacheco (baseball) (born 1964), Cuban baseball player
- António Pacheco (footballer, born 1966) (1966–2024), Portuguese football winger and football manager
- Antonio Pacheco (footballer, born 1976), Uruguayan football forward
- Antonio Pacheco (footballer, born 2002), Spanish football midfielder
- Antonio Pacheco (Puerto Rican footballer) (born 1989), Puerto Rican football forward

== See also ==
- Tony Pacheco (disambiguation)
