= Brian Hightower =

US international rugby union player

- Born: September 15, 1970 (age 56) Baltimore, United States
- Height: 5 ft 8 in (173 cm)
- Weight: 184 lb (83 kg)
- School: Great Bridge High School
- University: College of William & Mary

Rugby union career
- Position: Wing
International career
Years	Team	Apps	(Points)
1997–99	United States	17	(40)

Brian Hightower (born September 15, 1970) is an American former international rugby union player.

Hightower, born in Baltimore, is of Native American descent. He attended Great Bridge High School in Chesapeake, Virginia and picked up rugby union his sophomore year at the College of William & Mary.

A winger, Hightower made his United States debut in 1997 against Wales in Cardiff and played all three pool matches at the 1999 Rugby World Cup, scoring a try in their two-point loss to Romania. He gained 17 total caps during his career.

Hightower played rugby for the Gentlemen of Aspen, while working as a teacher at Aspen Middle School.

== See also ==
- List of United States national rugby union players
