= 1980 National Rugby Championships =

Tournament details
- Tournament format(s): Various
- Date: 1980

Tournament statistics

Final

The 1980 National Rugby Championships were a series of tournaments organized to determine a national champion in several divisions for United States rugby teams. The divisions included Men's/Women's Club, college, Military, Sevens, and Interterritorial.

== Men's Club ==
The 1980 National Club Rugby Championship was sponsored by Michelob and took place at Veteran's Memorial Stadium in Long Beach, California on May 10 and 11. The teams featured in the tournament were the champions of the four sub unions of USARFU. The Berkeley Old Blues won the title defeating St. Louis in the final after beating their New York namesakes in the semifinals for the second straight year. The All-Whites of Evansville, Indiana took third place. Whit Everett of Berkeley Old Blues was named MVP.

Regional Semifinal
April 26 - San Francisco, CA
Old Blues	16
Los Angeles RC	12
April 26 - San Francisco, CA
Old Puget Sound Beach	13
BATS	8
April 26 - Virginia Beach, VA
Old Blue	13
Whitemarsh	12
April 26 - Virginia Beach, VA
Norfolk Blues	17
Atlanta Renegades	11
April 20 - Norman, OK
St. Louis Falcons	25
Oklahoma U.	9
April 20 - Austin, TX
Houston Old Boys	9
Denver Barbarians	8
April 27 - Dayton, OH
Evansville All-Whites	13
West Side Harlequins	0
April 27 - Dayton, OH
Akron	W
Scioto Valley	L

Regional Final
April 27 - San Francisco, CA
Old Blues	24
Old Puget Sound Beach	12
April 27 - Virginia Beach, VA
Old Blue	15
Norfolk	9
April 27 - Denver, CO
St. Louis Falcons	29
Houston Old Boys	9
April 27 - Dayton, OH
Evansville All-Whites	25
Akron	9

National Semifinal
May 10 – Long Beach, CA
Old Blues (CA)	6
Old Blue (NY)	3
May 10 – Long Beach, CA
St. Louis Falcons	20
Evansville (IN)	9

National Final
May 11 – Long Beach, CA
Old Blues (CA)	20
St. Louis Falcons	6
Third place
May 11 – Long Beach, CA
Evansville (IN)	12
Old Blue (NY)	7

=== Semifinals ===
10 May 1980

Old Blues (CA)	6–3	Old Blue (NY)
Try: Gary Bunce c Con: Bill Armstrong (1/1)		Pen: Malcolm Kimble

Long Beach, CA
Referee: Ian Nixon

10 May 1980
11:00AM

St. Louis Falcons	20–9	Evansville All-Whites
Try: Gary Heyde; Flynn c Brown; Gene Figge c Con: Dennis Henley		Pen: Mike Hamlin (3)

Long Beach, CA
Referee: Dennis Shanagher

=== Third place ===
11 May 1980

Evansville All-Whites	12–7	Old Blue (NY)
Try: Mike Hamlin c Con: Mike Hamlin; Pen: 50' Mike Hamlin; Drop: Mike Hamlin		Try: 75' Mike Nolin; Pen: 4' Malcolm Kimble

Long Beach, CA

=== Final ===
11 May 1980

Old Blues (CA)	18–6	St. Louis Falcons
Try: 39' John Dixon; 68' Bill Armstrong; Mark Richter; Pen: Bill Armstrong (2)		Pen: Dennis Henley (2)

Long Beach, CA

Champions: Old Blues RFC of Berkeley, CA
Coach: Ron Mayes
Captain: Jeff Hollings (Hooker)
Roster: Bill Armstrong (Center), Rick Bailey (Prop), Jim Brazil (Prop), Gary Bunce (Center), Peter Burman (Flyhalf), Jack Clarke (Lock), John Dixon (Fullback), Lee Evan (Center), Whit Everett (Flanker), Stephen Gritsch (Wing), Chuck Hextrom (Lock), Jim Meyersieck (Scrumhalf), Mark Hoffman (Lock), Steve Ponder (#8), Mark Richter (Wing), Peter Richter (Flanker), Scott Stringer (Center), Mike Testerman (Prop), Art Ward (#8), Dennis Ward (Fullback), Blane Warhurst (Flanker).

== Women's Club ==
The 1980 Women's National Rugby Classic was a seven team tournament that took place on May 24–26 in Oakbrook, IL. The teams were split into two groups for round robin play. The Green division featured Florida State, Beantown, Ohio State and Chicago. The Red division included Minnesota, Wisconsin and Hoyden of Atlanta. The team from Florida State won the championship with five victories: FSU 29-3 Beantown, FSU 20-0 Ohio State, FSU 13-0 and 19–6 against Chicago and the 14-0 championship match against Hoyden of Atlanta, GA. En route to the final Hoyden dropped their opener 0-3 against Wisconsin then won two overtime games against Minnesota 8-4 and Wisconsin 4-0. Wisconsin defeated Chicago 6-0 for third place while Ohio State took fifth place with a 3-0 win over Minnesota. Seven members of Florida State were named to the all-tournament team.

7th place: Beantown
5th place: Ohio State 3–0 Minnesota
3rd place: Wisconsin 6–0 Chicago

=== Final ===
26 May 1980

Florida State	14–0	Hoyden(GA)
Try: Andra Douglas 6'; Susie Rosen 50'; Susie Rosen 75' c Con: Sharon Jamison

Oakbrook, IL

All Tournament Team
Mary Ellen Moynahan (Beantown) – Prop
Pam Mullins (Beantown) – Hooker
Betsy Kimball (Beantown) – Prop
Sue Meany (Ohio State) – 2nd Row
Bev Buhr (Wisconsin) – 2nd Row
Kathy Flores (Florida State) – #8
Vicky Bowlen (Florida State) – Wing Forward
Judy Lee (Wisconsin) – Wing Forward
Mary Homes (Florida State) – Scrumhalf
Renata Brady (Florida State) – Flyhalf
Cindy Beebe (Chicago) – Inside Center
Candi Orsini (Florida State) – Outside Center
Linda Lillis (Chicago) – Wing
Jamie McKallister (Florida State) – Wing
Karen Hornsby (Florida State) – Fullback

== College ==
The 1980 College championship was won by University of California at Berkeley. Air Force was runner-up.

== Military ==
The 1980 Military Club Rugby Championship took place at Wright–Patterson AFB in Ohio and was won by Coronado Navy with a 12–4 win over Scott AFB.

== Sevens ==
The 1980 National Sevens Rugby Tournament was hosted by the Hartford Wanderers and took place on June 14, 1980, at Sterling Field in West Hartford, Connecticut. The twelve team tournament was won by the Virginia Duck Brothers.

Semifinals
June 14 - Hartford, CT
Duck Brothers	16
Norfolk	15
June 14 - Hartford, CT
Hartford Wanderers	W
Sorcerers	L

Final
June 14 - Hartford, CT
Virginia Duck Brothers	28
Hartford Wanderers	10

== ITT ==
The Inter Territorial Tournament involved the four regional rugby unions comprising the United States RFU: Pacific Coast RFU, Western RFU, Midwest RFU, and the Eastern Rugby Union. The region teams are formed from selected players from the sub regional rugby unions. Subsequently, the USA Eagles are selected from the four regional teams after the ITT concludes. The 1980 edition was sponsored by Michelob and was played at Oak Brook Polo Field in Oak Brook, Illinois from May 24–26. The Pacific Coast RFU repeated as tournament champions.
Results:

24 May 1980

Pacific Coast	16–6	Midwest
Try: Tim O'Brien; Pen: Steve Gray (3); Drop: Ian Gunn		Pen: Dick Cooke (2)

Oakbrook, IL

24 May 1980

Western	13–12	Eastern
Try: Rob Porter; Pen: Doug Park (3)		Pen: Tommy Smith (3); Drop: 2' Tommy Smith

Oakbrook, IL

25 May 1980

Pacific Coast	25–6	Eastern
Try: 1' Tim O'Brien c Mike Fanucci c Mike Fanucci; Jay Hanson; Con: Chip Howard; Pen: 70' Ian Gunn		Try: 2' Bill Foye c

Oakbrook, IL
Referee: Jim Russell (Eastern Rockies)

25 May 1980

Midwest	22–6	Western
Try: Steve Finkle c Gary Larson; Con: Dick Cooke; Pen: Dick Cooke (3); Drop: Fred Schofield		Pen: Doug Park (2)

Oakbrook, IL

26 May 1980

Western	7–42	Pacific Coast
Try: Jim Cook; Pen: Doug Park		Try: Lin Walton; Ed Burlingham; Mark Deaton; Lin Walton; Tim O'Brien c Chip Howard; Mark Deaton c Dennis Shanagher; Con: Dennis Jablonski (5)

Oakbrook, IL
Referee: Skip McCarthy (British Columbia)

26 May 1980

Midwest	9–3	Eastern
Pen: Fred Warmbrodt (2); Drop: Fred Schofield		Pen: Tommy Smith

Oakbrook, IL

Team		W	L	F	A
1	Pacific Coast Grizzlies	3	0	83	19
2	Midwest Thunderbirds	2	1	37	25
3	Western Mustangs	1	2	26	76
4	Eastern Colonials	0	3	21	47

Champions: Pacific Coast Grizzlies
Coaches: Ron Nisbet, Rod Sears
Manager: Dan Hickey
Roster: Rick Bailey-Prop (Old Blues), Dave Bateman–Scrumhalf (Old Blues), David Briley-Prop (Santa Monica), Ed Burlingham–Lock (Irvine Coast), Jack Clark-Lock (Old Blues), Mark Deaton-#8 (California), Whit Everett-Flanker (Old Blues), Mike Fanucci–Wing (BATS), John Fowler–Flanker (UCLA), Steve Gray–Flyhalf (Los Angeles), Ian Gunn–Flyhalf (Old Puget Sound), Jay Hanson-Hooker (San Francisco), Jeff Hollings–Hooker (Old Blues), Chip Howard–Fullback (BATS), Dennis Jablonski–Fullback (Santa Monica), Bob MacFayden-Scrumhalf (OMBAC), Skip Niebauer-Flanker (BATS), Tim O'Brien-Center (California), Mike Pavich–Prop (Santa Monica), Dennis Shanagher-Center (San Francisco), Doug Straley-Scrumhalf (Hawaii Harlequins), Lin Walton-Wing (OMBAC), Art Ward-#8 (Old Blues), Peter Wood-Wing (Old Puget Sound), Craig Young-Flanker (BATS).
