= Central Washington Wildcats =

- University: Central Washington University
- Nickname: Wildcats
- NCAA: Division II
- Conference: GNAC (primary); LSC (football)
- Athletic director: Dr. Dennis Francois
- Location: Ellensburg, Washington
- Varsity teams: 13 (6 men's, 7 women's)
- Football stadium: Tomlinson Stadium
- Basketball arena: Nicholson Pavilion
- Baseball stadium: CWU Baseball Field
- Colors: Crimson and black
- Mascot: Wellington P. Wildcat
- Website: wildcatsports.com
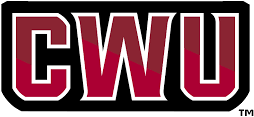

The Central Washington Wildcats (also CWU Wildcats) are the 13 varsity athletic teams that represent Central Washington University, located in Ellensburg, Washington, in NCAA Division II intercollegiate sports. The Wildcats compete as members of the Great Northwest Athletic Conference.

== Teams ==
Seasonal order of Wildcats sports
	Fall	Winter	Spring
Men's	Football, cross country,	Basketball, track & field	Baseball, Rugby, track & field
Women's	Volleyball, cross country, soccer	Basketball, track & field	Softball, Rugby, track & field

== National championships ==
=== Team ===
Sport	Association	Division	Year	Opponent/Runner-up	Score
Men's swimming and diving (3)	NAIA	Single	1984	Drury	292–285
Men's swimming and diving (3)	NAIA	Single	1986	Drury	381–335
Men's swimming and diving (3)	NAIA	Single	1987	Drury	443–404
Women's swimming and diving (1)	NAIA	Single	1986	Pacific Lutheran	378.5–331

== Individual teams ==
=== Football ===
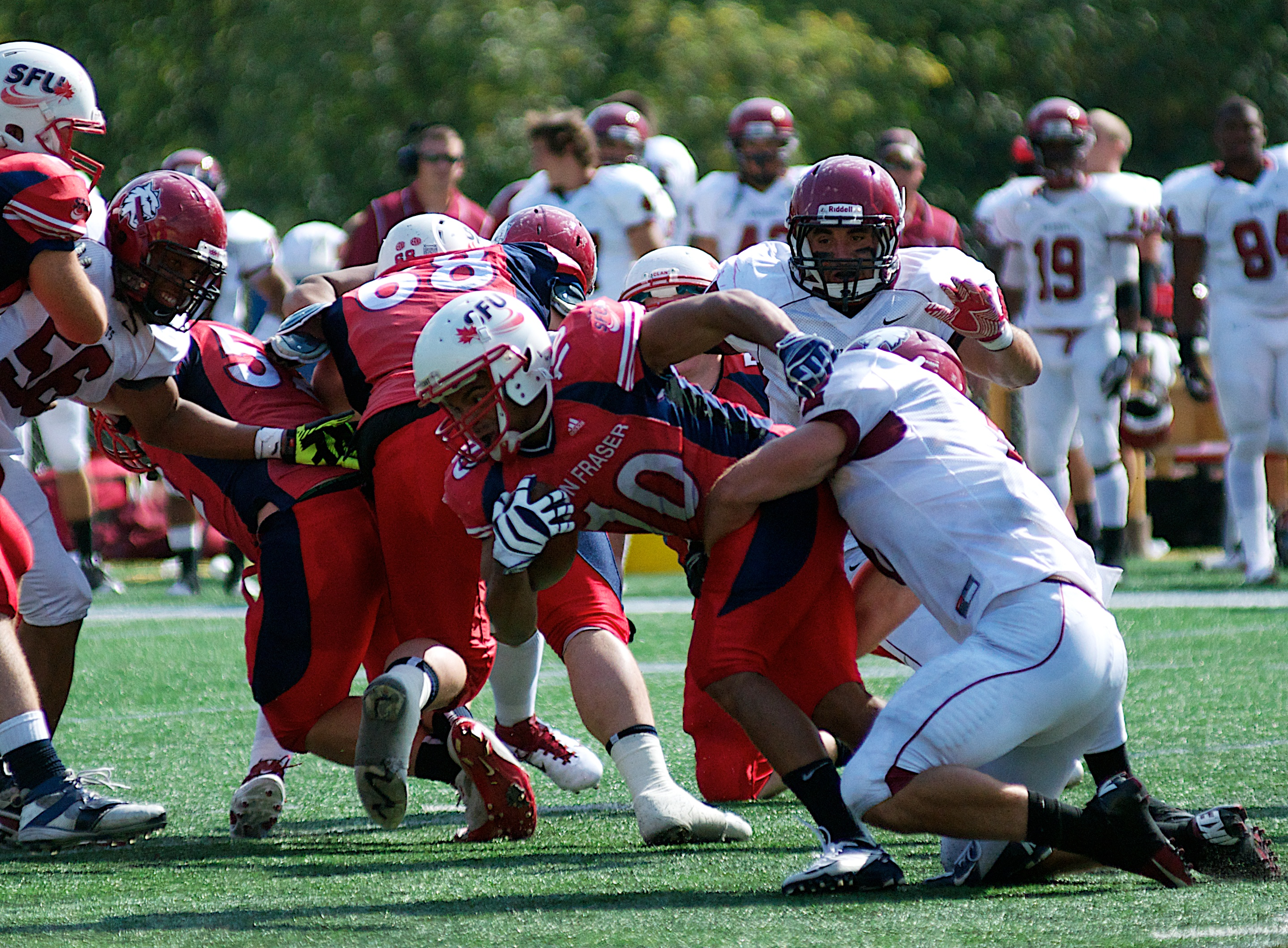
CWU (in white) v Simon Fraser in 2012

In 2006, they moved to the North Central Conference, because the Great Northwest Athletic Conference announced it would discontinue its participation in football following the 2005 season. Then in 2008, the Great Northwest Athletic Conference reinstated football, and Central Washington rejoined the conference.

The football team shared an intense rivalry with Western Washington University until Western's football team was disbanded in 2009. Prior to the dissolution of Western football, the teams had been competing in a game called the "Battle in Seattle" taking place at Seattle's CenturyLink Field, although historically the matchup was called the "Cascade Cup" when held at the usual university venues. In 2009, Central Washington University posted a perfect 11–0 record, the only Division II team to post a clean slate in the 2009 regular season. Central Washington then narrowly lost a playoff game to the Bearcats of Northwest Missouri State, who then won the NCAA Division II championship. In 2017, CWU once again posted a perfect 11–0 record. This earned the team the #1 seed in Super Region 4, and earning a bye week. However, they lost at home on Saturday November 25 to the Texas A&M–Commerce Lions in a double OT loss after a triumphant first half. The Lions would go on to win the NCAA Division II Championship against the West Florida Argonauts.

The Wildcats won the NAIA Division II football national championship in 1995 with Jon Kitna at quarterback.

=== Softball ===
In 2008, Wildcat softball players Mallory Holtman and Liz Wallace helped carry injured opponent Sara Tucholsky of Western Oregon University around the bases after she hit her first-ever career home run and injured herself running around the bases. CWU lost the game, ending the Wildcats' season. The story received national attention and the trio appeared on The Ellen DeGeneres Show, CBS, CNN and ESPN. They also won an ESPY award for Best Moment in Sports in 2008, were featured in Sports Illustrated, and are part of a national billboard campaign promoting sportsmanship by the Foundation for A Better Life.

=== Rugby ===
CWU Rugby operated as a university club sport from 1972 until 2013; the university announced in early 2014 that CWU Rugby would be a varsity sport within the CWU Department of Athletics. One of the factors in CWU rugby turning varsity was the exposure gained from the fact that the Varsity Cup tournament in which CWU plays every spring is broadcast live on NBC Sports.

Of the variety of sports offered by Central, the men's rugby union team has been particularly successful. CWU established the men's rugby team in 1972. The rugby team plays and regularly defeats larger Division I universities, such as the University of Washington, Washington State University, University of Oregon, and Oregon State University. Rugby at Central has been quite successful against these and other larger schools. The Wildcats played in the College Premier Division until 2013, but in 2013 moved to the Varsity Cup competition, and finished the season ranked sixth in the country.

Rugby has gained the Wildcats national recognition due to its high level of success in the national playoffs. Their most impressive accomplishments include making the Sweet 16 in 1998 and 2001. In 2001, Central defeated North Carolina 52–17 in their Sweet 16 match, before losing to Penn State 14–12 in the Elite 8. In 2007, the men's rugby team was ranked as high as 10th in the nation. Central finished the 2010–11 season ranked 7th in the US, and finished the 2012–13 season ranked 6th.

The Wildcats have also been successful in rugby sevens. The Wildcats won the 2011 Las Vegas Invitational to qualify for the 2011 Collegiate Rugby Championship. The Wildcats gained national attention for their rugby program when, led by Tim Stanfill, they finished fourth at the 2011 Collegiate Rugby Championship, a tournament broadcast live on NBC. That same year CWU Rugby finished 2nd (losing in overtime) at the USA Rugby Sevens Collegiate National Championships. Tim Stanfill was voted MVP of the 2012 Tournament and a member of the All-Tournament Team along with Forward Patrick Blair. Central Washington won the 2012 Northwest 7s tournament to qualify for the 2012 USA Rugby Sevens Collegiate National Championships. The Wildcats also played in the 2013 USA Rugby Sevens Collegiate National Championships, reaching the semifinals.

In 2012, CWU Rugby's head 7s coach and 15s head attack coach Tony Pacheco was named as the head coach for the Collegiate All-Americans 7s program. Pacheco, a product of CWU Rugby (Class of 2003), selected two CWU Rugby players, Tim Stanfill and Patrick Blair, as Collegiate All-Americans, joining Scott Anderson (Class of 1999) in obtaining All-American status as members of CWU Rugby.
