= Tony Pacheco (rugby union) =

Tony Pacheco is the head coach for the Central Washington University rugby team. CWU competes annually in the Varsity Cup.

Before he entered coaching, Pacheco played rugby for the US under-19 national team, Kentwood Rugby Club, and the Olympic Club.

Pacheco served as an assistant coach at Old Puget Sound Beach.

Pacheco is head coach at Central Washington University. CWU has had a successful program in rugby sevens, routinely qualifying for the USA Rugby Sevens National Championship. Central Washington has also been successful in rugby fifteens, with CWU finishing the 2013 season ranked sixth in the nation. Pacheco's success as coach led to Central Washington University promoting its rugby program from club status to varsity status in 2014.

Pacheco also serves as head coach for the U.S. men's collegiate All-American sevens team. The collegiate All-American sevens team is an important development pathway for the United States national rugby sevens team and for the USA Rugby Olympic Development Program.
