= South Field (Provo) =

Stadium in Provo, Utah

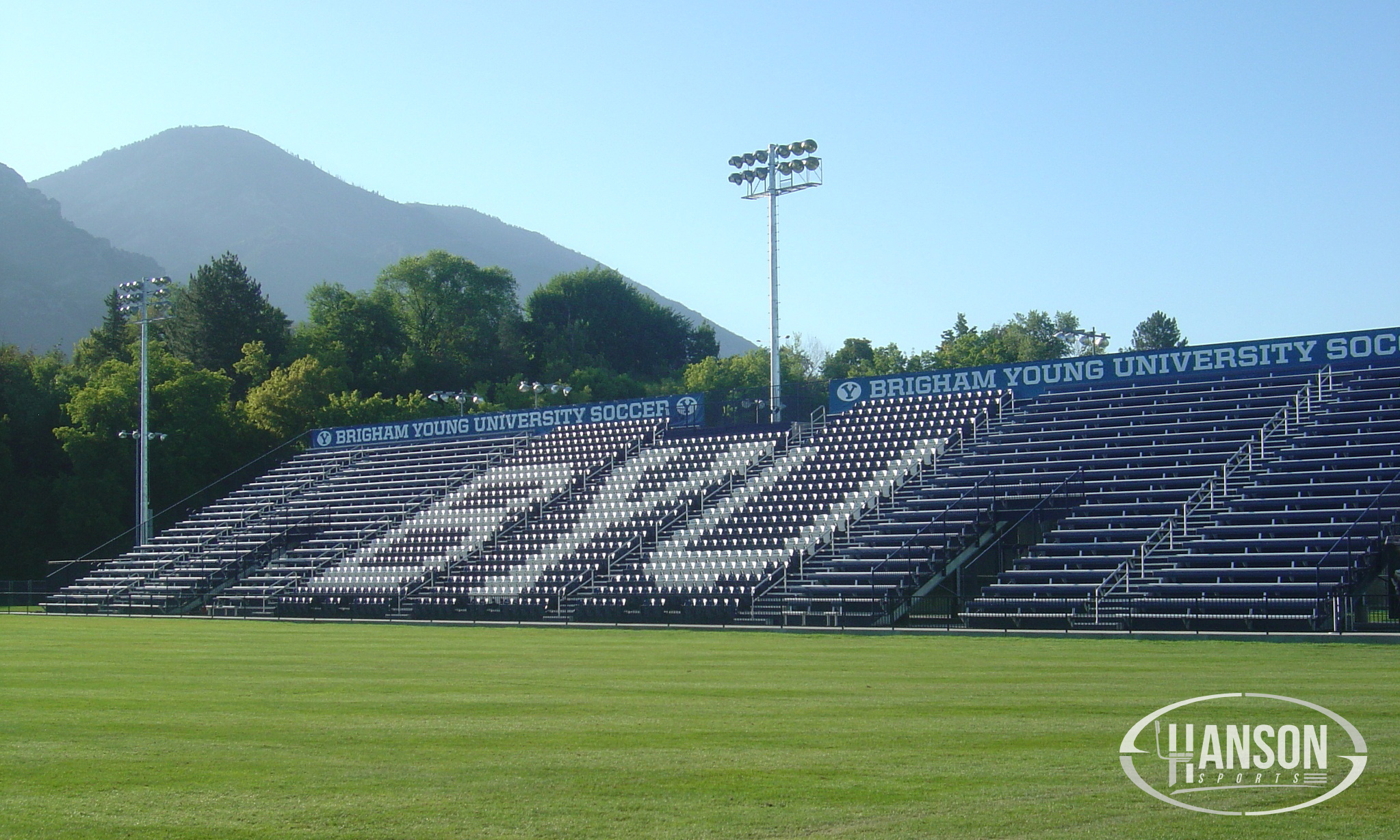
- Interior view of the stadium in 2008
- Interactive map of South Field (Provo)
- Location: 1 N University Ave, Provo, Utah, United States
- Coordinates: 40.246667°N 111.655278°W
- Owner: Brigham Young University
- Operator: BYU Athletics
- Capacity: 4,200
- Type: Soccer-specific stadium
- Record attendance: 5,735 - BYU Cougars women's soccer vs. UCLA Bruins women's soccer in 2017
- Current use: Soccer; Rugby union
- Public transit: UVX (at Joaquin station)

Construction
- Renovated: March 2008; Spring 2017

Tenants
- BYU Cougars (NCAA) teams: men's and women's soccer; men's and women's rugby

Website
- byucougars.com/soccer-facilities

The Stadium at South Field, more commonly known simply as "South Field", is a stadium in Provo, Utah on the campus of Brigham Young University.

The stadium serves as home to men's and women's soccer, as well as men's and women's rugby teams. Hanson Sports was the contractor selected to construct the bleachers at South Field in 2008. The stadium now features a grandstand with seating capacity up to 4,200 spectators, with additional standing room for larger crowds. The attendance record at South Field has been broken several times in the past few years, most recently in September 2015 when 5,620 fans attended a women's soccer match between host BYU and rival University of Utah.

Due to its well-maintained natural grass playing surface, South Field served as the practice facility for the United States Men's National Soccer Team prior to their World Cup qualifying match against Costa Rica in 2005.
