= BYU Cougars men's rugby =

US rugby union club, based in Provo, Utah

BYU Men’s Rugby
- Union: USA Rugby
- Nickname: Cougars
- Founded: 1962; 64 years ago
- Location: Provo, Utah
- Ground: South Field
- Coach: Steve St. Pierre
- League: 1-A
Team kit

Official website
- extramuralsports.byu.edu/rugby

The Brigham Young University Men's Rugby Team participates in the Rocky Mountain division of Division 1-A Rugby. They won the D1-A National Championship in 2009 and 2012. From 2013 to 2016 they participated in the Varsity Cup Championship, where they won three championships (2013, 2014, and 2015), defeating rival powerhouse Cal each time.

BYU Rugby normally hosts its home matches at South Field on BYU campus in Provo, Utah. The stadium now features a grandstand with seating capacity up to 4,200 spectators, with additional standing room for larger crowds.

BYU Rugby finished the 2019 season ranked 8th nationally, losing in the quarter-finals to Saint Mary's.

== History ==
=== Early years ===
The Brigham Young University Rugby team was founded by John Seggar in 1962 while a student. In 1967, after graduating from BYU, Seggar became Head Coach of the newly formed program, a position he held on and off for 15 seasons.

In the 1980s, players David Smyth, Mark Ormsby, and Dean Ormsby helped build up the BYU Rugby team to compete in national playoffs. However they were never able to advance past the quarterfinal round.

=== Post-season absence ===
In 1987, the National Collegiate Tournament changed the schedule of playing from Friday-Saturday to Saturday-Sunday. This change in schedule and the team's affiliation with the Church of Jesus Christ of Latter-day Saints kept them from competing for a national championship because they would not compete on Sundays. The change in the championship format also led Seggar to retire as the head coach.

Over the next few years, BYU Rugby continued to participate in regular season matches, but they participated in no post-season. David Smyth, Mark Ormsby, and Dean Ormsby acted as co-coaches, but they seemed unable to capture the zeal that Coach Seggar had inspired among his players. While under Smyth, Ormsby, and Ormsby the team never finished above .500. The three passed the program on to Vernon Heperi, the new BYU dean of students, who would later become the head coach.

After a temporary stay in the United Kingdom, Smyth returned to Utah in 1991 and once again assumed coaching responsibilities at BYU. Smyth left for the second time in 2002.

=== National championships ===
In 2004, USA Rugby returned post-season tournament play to a Friday-Saturday format, and BYU Rugby began playing again in the national tournament.

Under Head Coach Jared Akenhead — who took over from Smyth as head coach in 2002 — the BYU Rugby team made it to the national collegiate playoffs. Several of his players received All-American awards and National Team selection honors.

In 2005, Akenhead left the BYU Rugby program and Smyth once again assumed head coaching responsibilities, with Kimball Kjar, Wayne Tarawhiti, Brian Westenskow, Justen Nadauld, and Jeff Hullinger as assistant coaches.

In his 20+ seasons as head coach at BYU, Smyth has coached several USA National Rugby Team Members, Collegiate All-Americans, and Pacific Coast All-Stars. He has also led the Cougars to five collegiate championships: 2009, 2012, 2013, 2014, and 2015. Smyth retired from BYU Rugby at the end of the 2018 season. On August 13, 2018, it was announced Steve St. Pierre would become the new rugby head coach.

== Rivalries ==
Each year BYU competes in the Wasatch Cup, an annual rivalry match against the University of Utah. Since 2007 the symbol of victory has been a large loving cup style trophy with the match history inscribed in its base.

As of 2014 BYU participates in the West Coast Cup. The series features a home-and-home series between BYU and Saint Mary's. The match title comes from the fact that both teams compete in the West Coast Conference in most NCAA sanctioned sports.

Other matches that BYU participates in annually include the Champions Challenge, featuring BYU against a previous season semi-pro championship team, and the Rugby Bowl.

While not a regular rival on the schedule, BYU and Cal are regarded currently as being the top rugby rivalry in the nation. Since 2006 the Cougars and Bears have met in every season, except 2012, in the collegiate postseason tournament. Cal did not participate in any post-season collegiate rugby in 2012. Before 2006 the schools met in 1981, 1983, 1984, and 2001. 2015 marked the ninth time BYU and Cal have met for the national championship.

== National championships ==
=== Results ===
BYU has had several successful seasons, finishing as the top or one of the top teams in the country in post-season tournaments and in national rankings.

| Season | Post-season Tournament | Tournament Finish | National Ranking | Ref |
|---|---|---|---|---|
| 2005 | National Championship | 3rd | | |
| 2006 | National Championship | 2nd | | |
| 2007 | National Championship | 2nd | | |
| 2008 | National Championship | 2nd | | |
| 2009 | National Championship | 1st | | |
| 2010 | National Championship | 2nd | | |
| 2011 | Division 1-A | 2nd | 2nd | |
| 2012 | Division 1-A | 1st | 1st | |
| 2013 | Varsity Cup | 1st | 1st | |
| 2014 | Varsity Cup | 1st | 2nd | |
| 2015 | Varsity Cup | 1st | 1st | |
| 2016 | Varsity Cup | 2nd | 2nd | |
| 2017 | Division 1-A | 3rd | 3rd | |

=== Division 1-A Rugby ===
The following table shows the Division 1-A national championships where BYU reached at least the semifinals. In addition to the years listed below, the Cougars made the quarterfinals in 1999, 2018, and 2019 and were eliminated in the first round of the playoffs in 2004.

| YEAR | LOCATION | CHAMPION | SCORE | RUNNER-UP | 3rd PLACE | 4th PLACE |
|---|---|---|---|---|---|---|
| 2005 | Stanford, CA | California | 44-7 | Utah | BYU / Navy | |
| 2006 | Stanford, CA | California | 29-26 | BYU | Utah / Penn State | |
| 2007 | Stanford, CA | California | 37-7 | BYU | Navy / Penn State | |
| 2008 | Stanford, CA | California | 59-7 | BYU | Saint Mary's / Colorado | |
| 2009 | Stanford, CA | BYU | 25-22 | California | Army / San Diego State | |
| 2010 | Stanford, CA | California | 19-7 | BYU | Arkansas State / Army | |
| 2011 | Sandy, UT | California | 21-14 | BYU | Utah / Arkansas State | |
| 2012 | Sandy, UT | BYU | 49-42 | Arkansas State | Life / Saint Mary's | |
| 2017 | Moraga, CA | St. Mary's (CA) | 30–24 | Life University | BYU / Arizona | |

=== Varsity Cup ===
The following table is a list of each of the Varsity Cups in which BYU has reached at least the semifinals.

| YEAR | LOCATION | CHAMPION | SCORE | RUNNER-UP | 3rd PLACE | 4th PLACE |
|---|---|---|---|---|---|---|
| 2013 | Provo, UT | BYU | 27–24 | California | Central Washington / Navy | |
| 2014 | Sandy, UT | BYU | 43–33 | California | Central Washington / Navy | |
| 2015 | Sandy, UT | BYU | 30–27 | California | Central Washington / Navy | |
| 2016 | Provo, UT | California | 40–29 | BYU | Arkansas State / Central Washington | |

== Awards ==
=== USA National Team ===
- Ormsby, Mark - 1983, 1 cap
- Kjar, Kimball - 2001-2007, 19 caps, 12 points (2 tries), 2003 World Cup
- Sika, Salesi - 2003-2009, 29 caps, 25 points (5 tries), 2003 & 2007 World Cup
- Hullinger, Elwood (Jeff) - 2006, 5 caps, 30 points (6 tries)
- Tuilevuka, Pate - 2006-2010, 10 caps, 12 points (2 tries)
- Bloomfield, Henry - 2007-2008, 5 caps, 2007 World Cup
- Davies, Shaun - 2012-current, 25 caps, 23 points, 2019 World Cup
- Sumsion, Kyle - 2014-2015, 5 caps
- Jensen, Matt - 2017, 2 caps, 5 points (1 try)
- Lasike, Paul - 2018-current, 16 caps, 25 points, 2019 World Cup

=== Collegiate All-Americans ===
- Smyth, David - AA Head Coach (1990-2003) (2006 - 2007)
- Kjar, Kimball - Backs Coach (2010)
- Nadauld, Taylor - 2001
- Kjar, Kimball - 2001, 2002, 2003
- Stearns, Ned - 2002
- Sika, Salesi - 2003, 2004, 2005, 2006
- Blaser, John - 2004
- Poelman, Michael - 2005
- Hullinger, Jeff - 2006
- Taumoepeau, Ikani - 2006
- Tuilevuka, Alipate - 2006
- Kjar, Taylor - 2006, 2007
- Clark, Craig - 2006, 2007
- Smith, Derek - 2006, 2007, 2008
- Havea, Morris - 2007
- Ngakuru, Duran - 2007
- St. Pierre, Steve - 2007, 2008, 2009
- Malani, Apenisa - 2009
- Qaqa, Vito - 2009
- Su'a, Manti - 2009
- Folau, Byron - 2009, 2010 (HM)
- Davies, Shaun - 2009, 2010, 2011, 2012
- Su'a, Mikey - 2009, 2010, 2011, 2012
- Lubbe, Dylan - 2009, 2010, 2011, 2012 (HM)
- Lasike, Paul - 2009, 2012, 2013, 2014
- Sumsion, Kyle - 2009 (HM), 2012 (HM), 2013, 2014, 2015
- Vimahi, Viliami - 2010 (HM)
- Allred, TJ - 2010 (HM), 2012
- Roundy, Ryan - 2010, 2011, 2012, 2013
- Bonham, Mark - 2011
- Kofe, Hoseki - 2011, 2012, 2013
- Forrester, Ray - 2011,2012, 2013 (HM)
- Leaaetoa, Hynie - 2012
- Wernli, Chris - 2013 (HM)
- Linehan, Jonny - 2013 (HM), 2014, 2015
- Collins, David - 2014 (HM)
- Pikula, Joe - 2014 (HM)
- Mendenhall, Zane - 2014 (HM)
- Whippy, Josh - 2014, 2015, 2017
- Whippy, Jared - 2014, 2015, 2016 (HM), 2017
- Elkington, Arawa - 2014 (HM), 2015 (HM), 2016 (HM)
- Mocke, Luke - 2015, 2016 (HM)
- Laei, Tua - 2015 (2nd Team), 2016, 2017
- Jensen, Matt - 2016, 2017
- Vorster, Alex - 2016, 2017
- Whiting, Calvin - 2016, 2017
- Kaka, Jackson - 2016 (2nd Team), 2017
- Kevin Schofield - 2017
- Zach Webber - 2017
- Wilcox, Tosh - 2018 (HM)
- Mocke, James - 2019 (HM)

HM = Honorable Mention

=== Pacific Coast All-Stars ===
- Michael Poelman- 2005
- Derek Smith- 2006, 2007, 2008
- Craig Clark- 2006, 2007
- Taylor Kjar- 2006
- Steve St. Pierre - 2007, 2008, 2009

== See also ==
- Haka performed by non-New Zealand sports teams § Brigham Young University
- Mike Leach - prominent American football coach who played rugby at BYU from 1979 to 1983
