= California Golden Bears rugby =

College men's rugby union team representing the University of California, Berkeley

(United States) California Golden Bears Rugby
- Full name: California Golden Bears Rugby
- Union: USA Rugby
- Nickname: Golden Bears
- Founded: 1882; 144 years ago
- Location: Berkeley, California
- Ground: Witter Rugby Field (Capacity: 6,900)
- Coach: Jack Clark
- League: PAC Rugby Conference
1st kit	2nd kit

Official website
- calbears.com/sports/mens-rugby

The California Golden Bears rugby team is the college rugby team of the University of California, Berkeley. The Golden Bears have won 35 championships since the national collegiate championships for rugby began in 1980. Current head coach and Cal alumnus Jack Clark took over the team in 1984 and has achieved prolonged success, leading the Bears to 30 national titles, including twelve consecutive championships from 1991 to 2002, five more consecutive titles from 2004 to 2008, and back-to-back titles in 2010 to 2011, 2016 to 2017, 2025 to 2026.

Cal also has competed in the Collegiate Rugby Championship (CRC), the highest-profile college rugby sevens tournament in the U.S., winning the title each year from 2013 to 2017. The CRC was held every June from 2011 through 2019 at Subaru Park in the Philadelphia area. Cal also reached the finals of the 2010 CRC, losing to Utah in sudden-death extra time, and finished third in the 2012 CRC.

Cal also competes for the "World Cup," which is awarded to the winner of the annual series between Cal and the University of British Columbia.

Cal Rugby's home is at 6,900-seat Witter Rugby Field, located near California Memorial Stadium in Strawberry Canyon.

== History ==
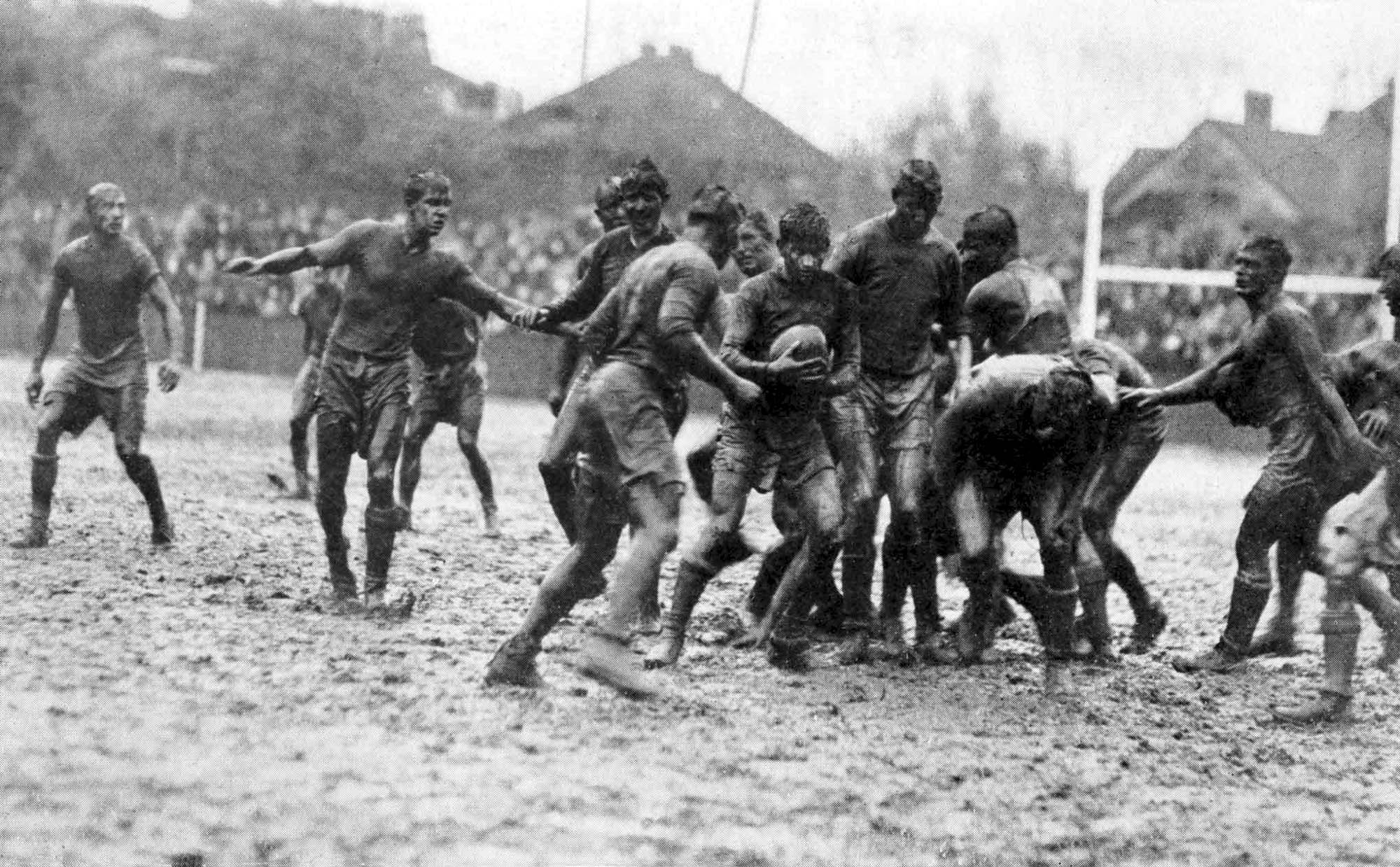
From 1906 to 1914, the "Big Game" was played under the rules of rugby union. The 1912 edition (pictured) would be nicknamed the mud game

Rugby began play at Cal in 1882 and continued until 1886, when it was replaced by American football. During the next decade, American football was becoming an increasingly violent sport - the ball carrier would often be pushed and pulled up the field by his own players in massive formations that often resulted in serious injuries. In 1905, 18 deaths and 159 injuries were reported in various football competitions. That year President Theodore Roosevelt lobbied Ivy League representatives to alter the game in order to eliminate or at least reduce its prevalent injuries. This resulted in numerous rule changes agreed upon by the majority of American schools.

Led by Cal and Stanford, universities of the West Coast took a different path, eliminating American football and changing their game to Rugby union. Other schools that made the switch included Nevada, St. Mary's, Santa Clara, and USC (in 1911). Because the switch to rugby occurred only on the West Coast, the number of teams to play against remained small. This led to schools scheduling games against local clubs and reaching out to rugby powers in Australia, New Zealand, as well as Canada.

Cal and Stanford's traditional rivalry game–the Big Game–became a rugby union match, with the winner invited by the British Columbia Rugby Union to a tournament in Vancouver over the Christmas holidays to play for the Cooper Keith Trophy. While Cal won the Cooper cup in 1910, in total it only won three Big Games during this 9 year period. Due to various causes, including students' frustration with the results, the Associated Students of the University of California voted to leave the agreement, and along with other west coast universities, return to American football. From 1906 to 1914, Cal's rugby record was 78 wins, 21 losses and 10 ties. Following the switch back to football, Cal continued to play rugby, but it was officially considered to be a "minor" sport.

Primarily Cal, Stanford, and Santa Clara players composed the two US Olympic rugby teams (1920 & 1924) and claimed fame by winning both Gold medals. Prior to the introduction of Rugby 7s at the 2016 Summer Olympics, 1924 was the last time the Olympic Games staged a rugby competition.

In 1931, rugby returned under alumnus Ed Graff. 1938 began the era of Miles "Doc" Hudson, who guided the Bears for 37 years and an incredible record of 339-84-23. His successor was Ned Anderson, an alumnus and former rugger for the Bears.

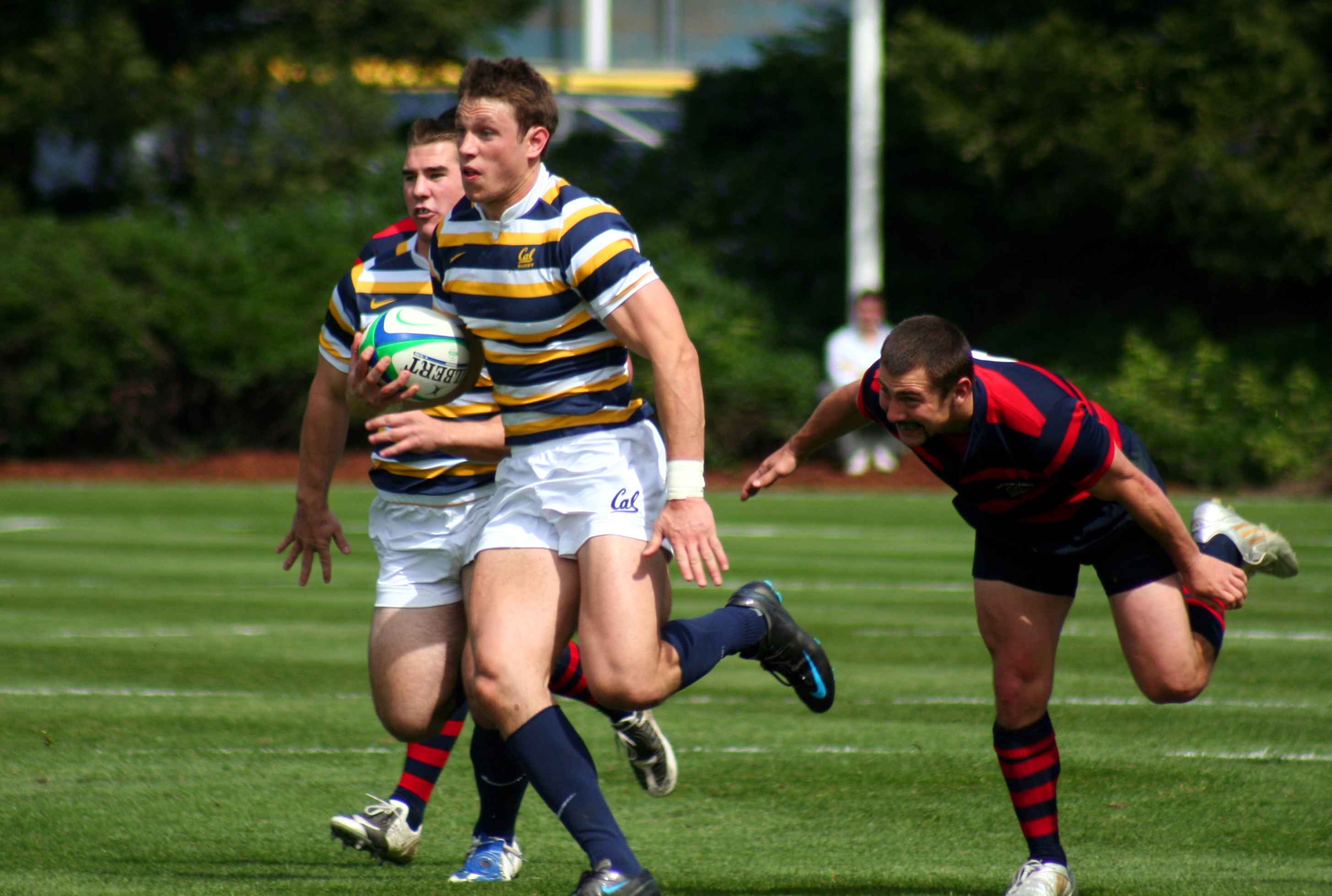
Cal playing v St. Mary's in March 2010

In September 2010, the university announced that rugby would be one of five varsity sports cut as a cost-cutting measure, though the team would have continued to represent the university as a "varsity club sport." A large group of rugby supporters organized and disputed the relegation. On February 11, 2011, the administration reversed its decision on rugby and two other sports, and rugby was continued as a varsity sport.

Mark Bingham who played for the Golden Bears in the early 1990s was a passenger on board United Airlines Flight 93 on September 11, 2001.

Cal reached the final of the Varsity Cup every year of the five year competition, winning in 2017 and 2018.

== Team performances ==
=== National championships ===
The following table is a list of each of the national championships since 1980 in which Cal has reached at least the semifinals.

Year	Location	Champion	Score	Runner-up	3rd Place	4th Place
1980	Davenport, IA	California	15–9	Air Force Academy	Illinois	Navy
1981	Dayton, OH	California	6–3 (a.e.t.)	Harvard University	Miami (OH)	Kansas St.
1982	Greeley, CO	California	15–14	Life	Michigan	New Mexico St.
1983	Athens, GA	California	13–3	Air Force	Navy	Illinois
1985	Pebble Beach, CA	California	31–6	Maryland	Colorado	Illinois
1986	Pebble Beach, CA	California	6–4	Dartmouth	Bowling Green	Air Force
1988	Pebble Beach, CA	California	9–3	Dartmouth	Air Force	Bowling Green
1991	Houston, TX	California	20–14	Army	Ohio State	Wyoming
1992	Colorado Springs, CO	California	27–17	Army	Air Force	Penn State
1993	Houston, TX	California	36–6	Air Force	Harvard	Wisconsin
1994	Washington, DC	California	27–13	Navy	Air Force	Penn State
1995	Berkeley, CA	California	48–16	Air Force	Penn State	Army
1996	Colorado Springs, CO	California	47–6	Penn State	Stanford	Navy
1997	Berkeley, CA	California	41–15	Penn State	UC Davis	Stanford
1998	San Francisco, CA	California	34–15	Stanford	Navy	Indiana Univ.
1999	San Francisco, CA	California	36–5	Penn State	Navy	Army
2000	Tampa Bay, FL	California	62–16	Wyoming	Army	Indiana Univ.
2001	Virginia Beach, VA	California	86–11	Penn State	Navy	Army
2002	Virginia Beach, VA	California	43–22	Utah	Army	Wyoming
2003	Stanford, CA	Air Force	45–37	Harvard	California	Army
2004	Stanford, CA	California	46–24	Cal Poly, SLO	Navy / Air Force	
2005	Stanford, CA	California	44–7	Utah	BYU / Navy	
2006	Stanford, CA	California	29–26	BYU	Utah / Penn State	
2007	Stanford, CA	California	37–7	BYU	Navy / Penn State	
2008	Stanford, CA	California	59–7	BYU	St. Mary's / Colorado	
2009	Stanford, CA	BYU	25–22	California	Army / San Diego State	
2010	Stanford, CA	California	19–7	BYU	Arkansas State / Army	
2011	Sandy, UT	California	21–14	BYU	Utah / Arkansas State	
2013	Provo, UT	BYU	27–24	California	Central Washington / Navy	
2014	Salt Lake City, UT	BYU	43–33	California	Central Washington / Navy	
2015	Salt Lake City, UT	BYU	30–27	California	Central Washington / Navy	
2016†	Provo, UT	California	40–29	BYU	Central Washington / Arkansas State	
2017†	Santa Clara, CA	California	43–13	Arkansas State	Penn State / Navy	
2018	Santa Clara, CA	Life	60–5	California	Lindenwood / Penn State	
2019	Santa Clara, CA	Life	29–26	California	St. Mary's / Lindenwood	
2022	West Point, NY	Army	20–8	St. Mary's	California / Lindenwood	
2023	Houston, TX	Navy	28–22	California	BYU / Lindenwood	
2025	Indianapolis, Indiana	California	55–38	Life	St. Mary's / Lindenwood	
2026	Indianapolis, Indiana	California	36–22	Navy	St. Mary's / Life	
†Indicates year in which Cal won the now defunct Varsity Cup.

=== Varsity Cup ===
The following table is a list of each of the Varsity Cups in which Cal has reached at least the semifinals.

Year	Location	Champion	Score	Runner-up	3rd Place	4th Place
2013	Provo, UT	BYU	27–24	California	Central Washington / Navy	
2014	Salt Lake City, UT	BYU	43–33	California	Central Washington / Navy	
2015	Salt Lake City, UT	BYU	30–27	California	Central Washington / Navy	
2016	Provo, UT	California	40–29	BYU	Arkansas State / Central Washington	
2017	Santa Clara, CA	California	43–13	Arkansas State	Penn State / Navy	

=== USA Rugby Sevens Collegiate National Championships ===
Year	Location	Position	Record
2011	College Station, TX	DNP	--
2012	College Station, TX	10th	4-2
2013	College Station, TX	1st	5-0

=== Collegiate Rugby Championship (Sevens) ===
Year	Location	Position	Record
2010	Columbus, OH	2nd	5-1
2011	Philadelphia, PA	5th-tied	3-1
2012	Philadelphia, PA	3rd	5-1
2013	Philadelphia, PA	1st	6-0
2014	Philadelphia, PA	1st	6-0
2015	Philadelphia, PA	1st	6-0
2016	Philadelphia, PA	1st	6-0
2017	Philadelphia, PA	1st	6-0

=== PAC Rugby 7s conference championships ===
Year	Location	Champion	Score	Runner-up	3rd Place	Ref.
2012	Los Angeles	California	21–12	Utah	UCLA	
2013	Los Angeles	California	22–0	UCLA	Oregon State	
2014	Berkeley	California	45–5	Arizona State	UCLA	
2015	Berkeley	California	17–5	UCLA	Arizona State	
2016	Tucson	California	47–14	Arizona State	Utah	
2018	Berkeley	California	33–5	Arizona	Arizona	
2019	Stanford	California	24–7	Arizona	UCLA/Utah	
2021	Berkeley	California	10–0	UCLA	Arizona	
2022	Stanford	California	31–5	Arizona	Stanford/UCLA	

== National team players ==
=== United States ===
==== Major international competitions. ====
Following players have played for the Eagles, the United States national rugby team in major international competitions.

- Mike MacDonald - 2003, 2007 and 2011 Rugby World Cup; also the most-capped player in Eagles history at retirement.
- Louis Stanfill - 2007, 2011 and 2015 Rugby World Cup
- Eric Fry - 2011, 2015 and 2019 Rugby World Cup
- Blaine Scully - 2011, 2015 and 2019 Rugby World Cup
- Gary Hein - 1987 and 1991 Rugby World Cup
- Kevin Dalzell - 1999 and 2003 Rugby World Cup
- Kirk Khasigian - 1999 and 2003 Rugby World Cup
- Kort Schubert - 2003 Rugby World Cup
- Chris Biller - 2011 Rugby World Cup
- Danny Barrett - 2015 Rugby World Cup
- Seamus Kelly - 2015 Rugby World Cup
- Colin Hawley - 2011 Rugby World Cup
- Nick Civetta - 2019 Rugby World Cup

Of the 30-man squad for the 2011 Rugby World Cup, 7 were Cal alums.

==== Appearances outside of major international competitions. ====
- Andre Bachelet
- Christian Dyer
- Sam Golla
- Ray Green
- Steve Hyatt
- Jack Iscaro
- Don James
- Ray Lehner
- Rob Lumkong
- Chris O'Brien
- Shaun Paga
