= Division 1-A Rugby =

Highest level of college rugby union in the USA

- Current season, competition or edition: 2026 Division 1-A Rugby Championship
- Formerly: College Premier Division
- Sport: Rugby union
- Founded: 1980 (as National Collegiate Championship); 2010 (as Division 1-A)
- First season: 2011
- Director: Paul Santinelli
- Commissioner: Scott Zavrel
- Organizing body: USA Rugby
- No. of teams: 38
- Country: United States
- Most recent champion: California (2026)
- Most titles: California (28 titles)
- Broadcaster: YouTube
- Website: craa.rugby/d1a

Division 1-A Rugby (formerly known as the College Premier Division) is the highest level of men's college rugby within the United States and is administered by USA Rugby. Division 1-A rugby is modeled after NCAA athletic competitions, with the 38 D1-A rugby schools divided into six conferences: Rugby East, Midwest, Rocky Mountain, California, Big Ten, and Independent.

The regular season sees all teams in the conference play one another, with the two top seeds qualifying for the playoffs. Playoffs are a single-elimination format, occurring each year in April and May, with the winner of D1-A declared the National Champion. Regular seasons for most conferences are played in the spring, although some cold-weather conferences, such as the Big Ten Universities, play their regular season in the fall.

The competition's first season was played during 2011 and consisted of teams from 31 schools from across the United States. The first ever match of the competition was played on Friday March 4, the Arizona State Sun Devils hosted the Colorado Buffaloes at the Arizona State University Soccer Stadium in Tempe, Arizona. The 2011 final was played at Rio Tinto Stadium, in Sandy, Utah, on the 21 May 2011.

Several players who have excelled in the top-level competitions in college rugby have also represented their country as part of the United States national under-20 rugby union team or the All Americans rugby union team.

== Formation ==
=== History of college rugby in the U.S. ===
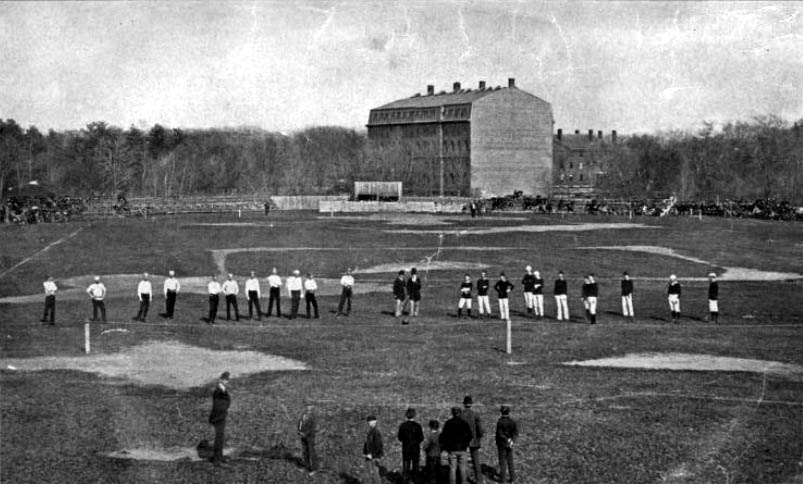
One of the Harvard v McGill games played in 1874

A group of British Army officers organized a game of rugby against the students of McGill University (Montreal, Quebec, Canada) in 1865; the Canadians were so enamored of the game that they decided to continue to play football by the Rugby code. In 1874 McGill organized two games of football against Harvard, one was played under Harvard's rules, the other under "McGill" rugby rules. In late 1874, the Harvard team traveled to Montreal to play McGill in rugby, and won by three tries in front of 2,000 spectators. In 1875 Harvard athlete Nathaniel Curtis challenged Yale's captain, William Arnold to a rugby-style game. Columbia, Princeton and Yale were persuaded by Harvard to play football according to the Rugby School code in 1876. These four colleges formed the Intercollegiate Football Association (IFA), an organization that eventually expanded to become the "Ivy League." In fact, the governing body of all American intercollegiate varsity sports, the National Collegiate Athletic Association (NCAA) traces its roots to the IFA and is thus a product of rugby rather than any of the sports it now governs.

By 1886 the Yale coach Walter Camp had modified rugby's rules in order to solve the problem of tackled players lying on the ball by introducing a series of four downs to gain ten yards; ironically in the same year the Rugby Football Union in England solved the same problem by requiring that tackled players release the ball. This is still one of the most fundamental differences between Rugby Union and American Football but one further modification, that of allowing one forward pass per down, was suggested by the Notre Dame coach Knute Rockne which, when accepted in 1905, gave rise to that distinctly American form of football.

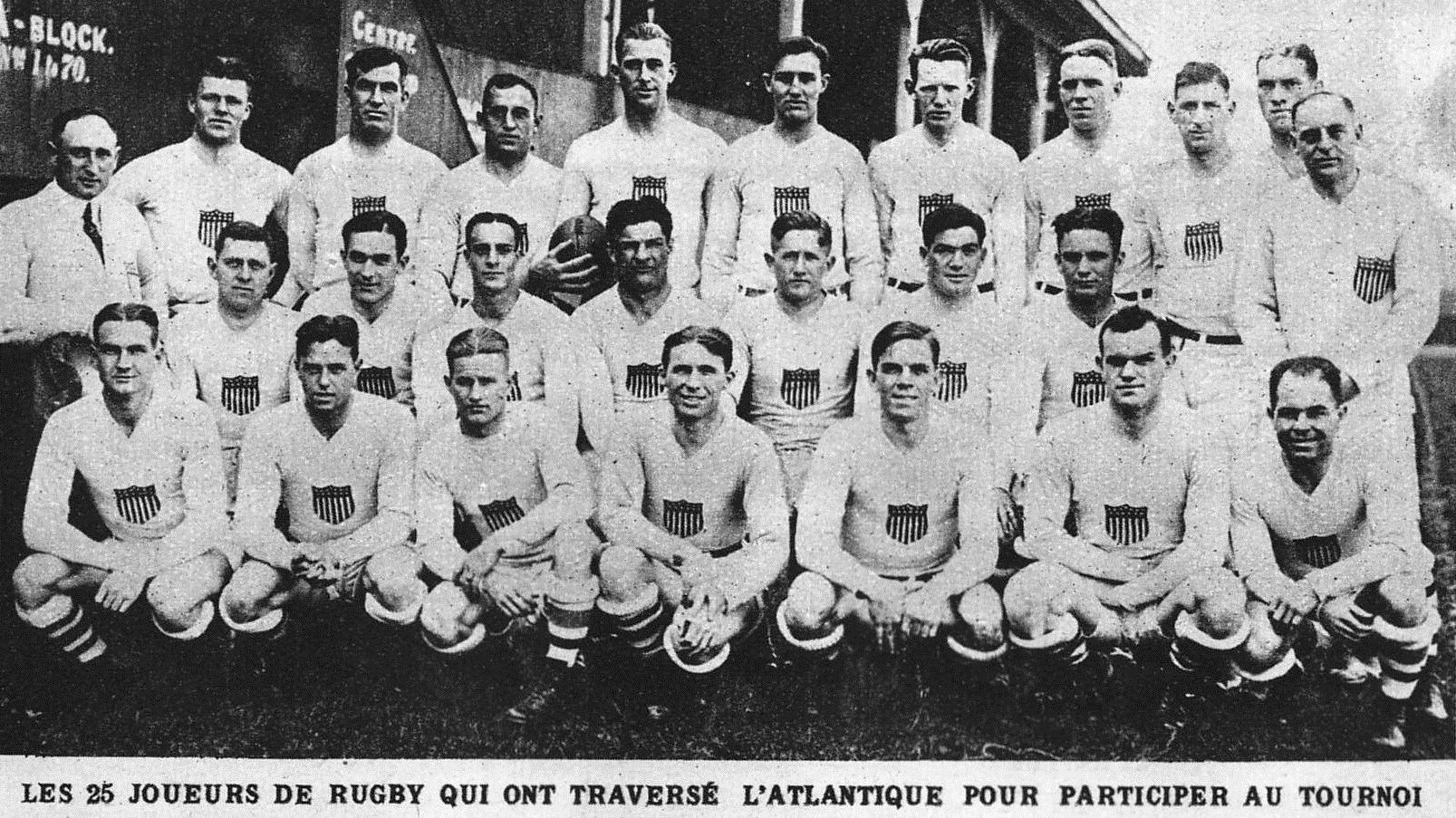
1924 USA Olympic team that won the gold medal

Around the turn of the century American football was being frowned upon for its violence. Publication of graphic photographs of a harsh game between Swarthmore College and the University of Pennsylvania caused a stir; President Theodore Roosevelt was forced to insist upon reform or abolition of the game. During this period of uncertainty, rugby made a brief but important reappearance in many colleges, most notably at the University of California and at Stanford. It was Stanford that supplied most of the players to the two US Olympic rugby teams (1920 and 1924), along with Santa Clara University and the University of California, who claimed fame by winning both gold medals. As 1924 was the last time the Olympic Games staged a rugby competition, this made the USA the defending Olympic champions when rugby was re-introduced after almost a century at the 2016 Summer Olympics.

In 1934, there was only one official rugby body in the United States, the Eastern Rugby Union, with a total of 9 member teams. By 1950, there were 30 clubs in the US, existing only in small pockets on the East and West Coasts.

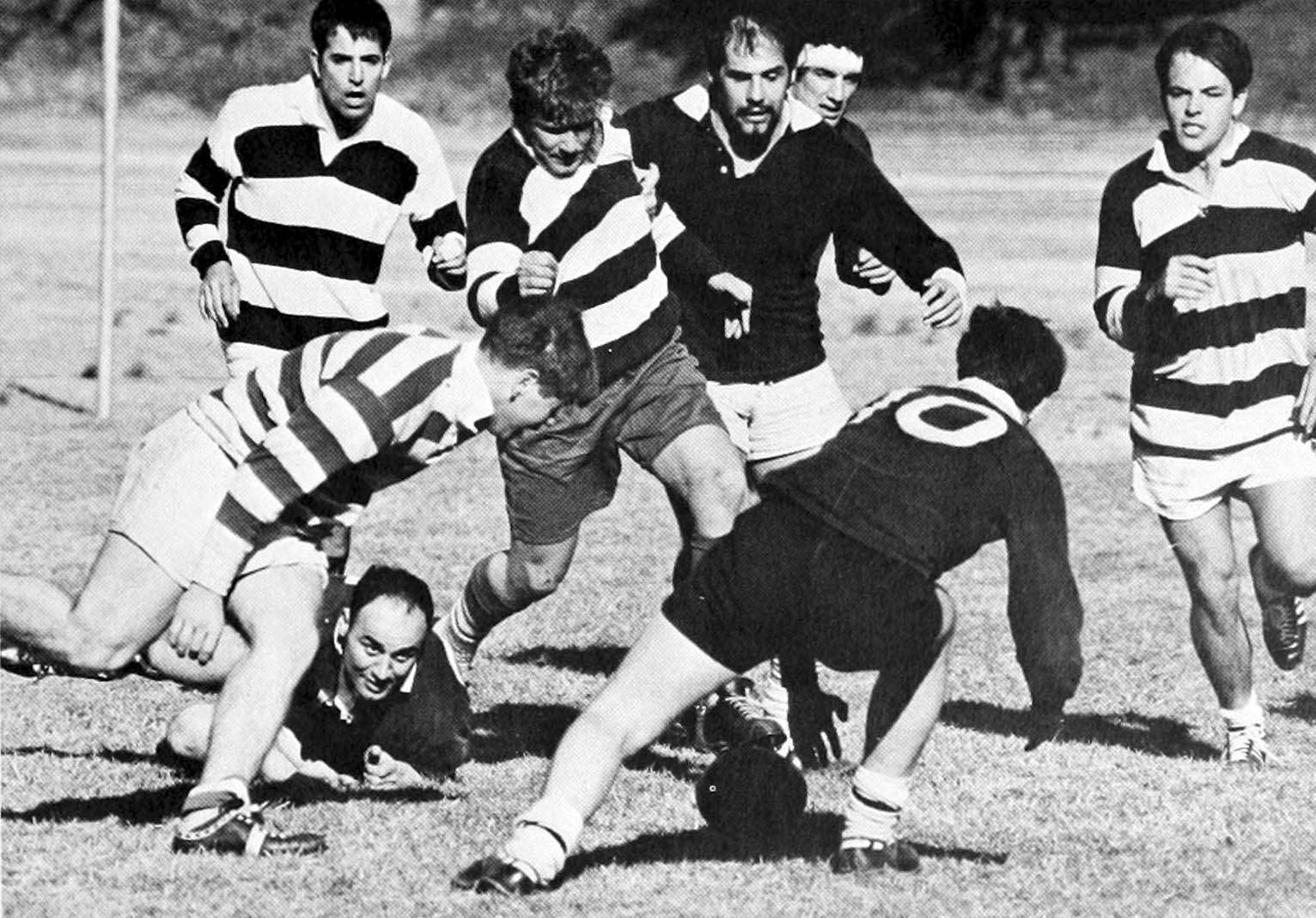
Duke Blue Devils (hoops jersey) match in 1968

It was not until the mid-1960s that rugby began to re-appear with regular fixtures and competitions; the game suited the mildly anarchistic temperament of American College students of the period; it required minimal costs for the individual, the style of the game provided constant action, there was an emphasis on enjoyment rather than winning because rugby was not part of the now rigidly institutionalized athletic system that American Universities had developed. The formation of the United States of America Rugby Football Union (USARFU, now USA Rugby) in 1976 was a major organizational milestone for the sport in the US, and by 1980 there were over 1,000 clubs nationwide.

In 2011, there were 2,433 clubs in the United States with more than 88,000 registered players, approximately 40% of which are college players (about three-quarters being male and one quarter female).

=== Formation of Division 1-A ===
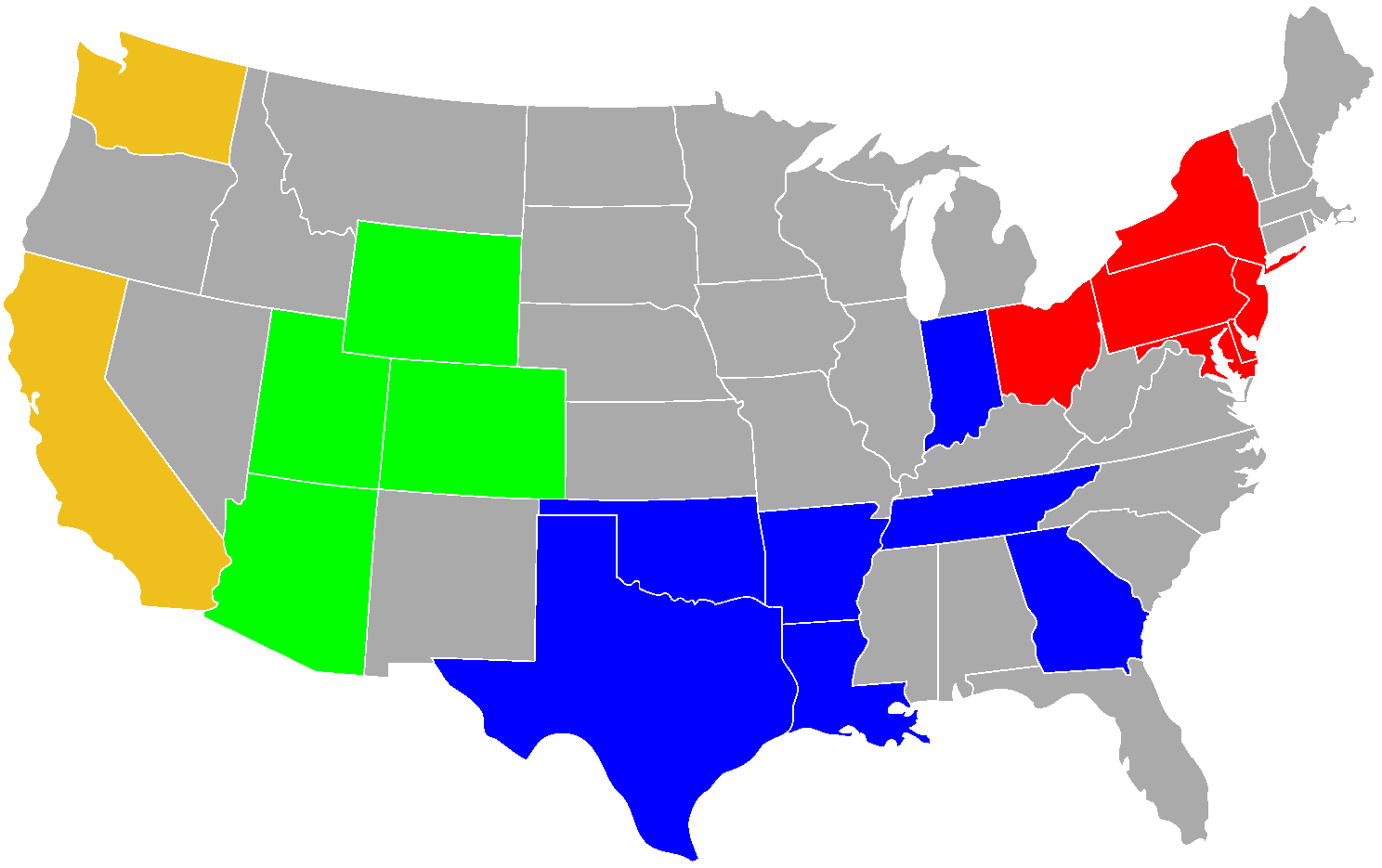
The 2011 CPD participants, colored by conference Pacific gold -- West green -- Mid-South blue -- East red

Prior to the formation of Division 1-A, there had been some difficulty in determining how many teams each territory would send to the Sweet 16 tournament, as the relative strengths of the rugby teams in each territory fluctuated over time, and despite the disparity in the levels of rugby, it was politically difficult to deny a union any playoff bids, even though the team that came third or fourth in a more powerful territory might be a better side. Further problems occurred because of the different competitive seasons across the continent; in the East the league season is played in the fall while in the South and West spring is the primary season, so this structure was frequently open to criticism.

Because of these issues, and to raise the level of rugby in the consciousness of the American public, USA Rugby restructured Division 1 college rugby. In 2010, several of the top college teams agreed to form the College Premier League to begin play in spring 2011. USA Rugby and the top colleges believed that an elite level college rugby competition would make it easier to get college rugby onto TV and attract sponsors. D1-A Rugby secured sponsorships in 2012 with World Rugby Shop and Veloce. USA Rugby also believed that a higher level college competition would develop players to potentially play for the U.S. national team.

The governance of collegiate rugby was split and diverged in 2021. National Collegiate Rugby (NCR), formerly NSCRO, emerged as a rival by expanding beyond small colleges to include the higher divisions. The umbrella of the USA Rugby Collegiate Council includes College Rugby Association of America (CRAA), among several other organizations. In 2021, there were five men's DIA conferences plus independents under USA Rugby/CRAA. Two men's conferences that played DIA in 2019 joined NCR in 2021.

== D1-A Championships results ==
Ed.	Year	Champion	Score	Runners-up	Venue	City	Att.	TV Coverage	Semi-finalists
1	2011	California	21–14	BYU	Rio Tinto Stadium	Sandy	11,000	ESPN3 / ESPNU	Arkansas St. / Utah
2	2012	BYU	49–42	Arkansas St.	Rio Tinto Stadium	Sandy	8,733	ESPN3	Life University / St. Mary's
3	2013	Life University	16–14	St. Mary's	UNCG Soccer Stadium	Greensboro	4,000	ESPN3 / ESPNU	Arkansas St. / Cal Poly
4	2014	Saint Mary's	21–6	Life University	Steuber Rugby Stadium	Palo Alto	4,000	USA Rugby TV	Arkansas St. / Lindenwood
5	2015	Saint Mary's	30–24	Life University	Fifth Third Bank	Atlanta	3,100	ESPN3	Lindenwood / Davenport
6	2016	Life University	24–20	St. Mary's	St. Mary's Stadium	Moraga	2,000	Rugby Channel	Lindenwood / Utah
7	2017	Saint Mary's	30–24	Life University	St. Mary's Stadium	Moraga	2,000	CBSSN	BYU / Arizona
8	2018	Life University	60–5	California	Stevens Stadium	Santa Clara	4,000	CBSSN	Penn State / Lindenwood
9	2019	Life University	29–26	California	Stevens Stadium	Santa Clara	4,000	CBSSN	St. Mary's / Lindenwood
10	2022	Army	20–8	St. Mary's	Aveva Stadium	Houston	—N/a	Rugby Network	Lindenwood / California
11	2023	Navy	28–22	California	Aveva Stadium	Houston	—N/a	Rugby Network	Lindenwood / BYU
12	2024	Saint Mary's	26–22	Navy	Aveva Stadium	Houston	—N/a	Rugby Network	BYU / Life University
13	2025	California	55–38	Life University	Kuntz Stadium	Indianapolis	—N/a	Rugby Network	Saint Mary's / Lindenwood
14	2026	California	36–22	Navy	Kuntz Stadium	Indianapolis	—N/a	YouTube	Saint Mary's / Life University

== Collegiate Championship results prior to D1-A Formation ==
The earliest claims to a national title go back to the mid-1960s when Sports Illustrated Magazine started demonstrating an interest in collegiate rugby. During the 1965-1966 season, the University of Notre Dame won several cups and tournaments and, in the absence of a bona fide national championship, Sports Illustrated named them unofficial collegiate rugby champions. The next year, under the authority of USARFU, Notre Dame played a match on April 8, 1967 against California at Memorial Stadium for the unofficial national championship, again as a result of both teams being highly rated by Sports Illustrated; Cal won 37-3.

=== National Invitational Championship ===
School Year	Champion	Match Score	Runner-up	Ref.
1971–1972	Palmer College of Chiropractic	28–17	Navy	
1972–1973	Palmer College of Chiropractic	13–4	Illinois	
1973–1974	Texas A&M	12–0	LSU	
1974–1975*	UCLA	10–7	Santa Monica†	
1975–1976*	UCLA‡	16–13	Old Puget Sound†	
1976–1977	LSU	21–3	Palmer College of Chiropractic	
1977–1978	Palmer College of Chiropractic	19–4	LSU	
1978–1979	Palmer College of Chiropractic	24–6	Navy	
*The collegiate invitational championship tournament was not held in the 1974-1975 and 1975-1976 school years. Texas A&M planned to host this tournament in March, 1976, but it likely did not occur, as there are evidently no results or details. Some colleges competed against club sides in the separate Monterey National Championships, an annual event that was considered to be the sport's de facto national championship.
†Santa Monica and Old Puget Sound were not college teams.
‡UCLA finished in 3rd place, the highest finish of any college team

=== National Collegiate Rugby Championship ===
The first official National Collegiate Championship series began in 1980. Rugby in the United States is divided into territorial unions (the Mid-Atlantic, Midwest, Northeast, Pacific Coast, the South, Southern California, and the West). Each of these unions organized collegiate rugby into "Division One" and "Division Two" league competitions, generally with promotion and relegation between the divisions. Between 1980 and 2010 each Territory qualified Division One and Two teams for the Sweet 16 of a D1 and D2 National championship.

California was dominant in Division One for the 31 years that the competition was run in this format, winning 25 titles. Air Force won three titles; Harvard, San Diego State, and Brigham Young University each won one D1 national championship.

Year	Location	Champion	Score	Runner-up	3rd Place	4th Place
1980	Davenport, IA	California	15–9	Air Force	Illinois	Navy
1981	Dayton, OH	California	6–3 OT	Harvard	Miami (OH)	Kansas St.
1982	Greeley, CO	California	15–14	Life College	Michigan	New Mexico St.
1983	Athens, GA	California	13–3	Air Force	Navy	Illinois
1984	Pebble Beach, CA	Harvard	12–4	Colorado	Long Beach St.	Miami (OH)
1985	Pebble Beach, CA	California	31–6	Maryland	Colorado	Illinois
1986	Pebble Beach, CA	California	6–4	Dartmouth	Air Force	Bowling Green
1987	Pebble Beach, CA	San Diego State	10–9	Air Force	Bowling Green	Dartmouth
1988	Pebble Beach, CA	California	9–3	Dartmouth	Air Force	Bowling Green
1989	Colorado Springs, CO	Air Force	25–7	Penn State	Army	Long Beach St.
1990	Pebble Beach, CA	Air Force	18–12	Army	Ohio State	Long Beach St.
1991	Houston, TX	California	20–14	Army	Ohio State	Wyoming
1992	Colorado Springs, CO	California	27–17	Army	Air Force	Penn State
1993	Houston, TX	California	36–6	Air Force	Harvard	Wisconsin
1994	Washington, DC	California	27–13	Navy	Air Force	Penn State
1995	Berkeley, CA	California	48–16	Air Force	Penn State	Army
1996	Colorado Springs, CO	California	47–6	Penn State	Stanford	Navy
1997	Berkeley, CA	California	41–15	Penn State	UC Davis	Stanford
1998	San Francisco, CA	California	34–15	Stanford	Navy	Indiana Univ.
1999	San Francisco, CA	California	36–5	Penn State	Navy	Army
2000	Tampa Bay, FL	California	62–16	Wyoming	Army	Indiana Univ. of PA (IUP)
2001	Virginia Beach, VA	California	86–11	Penn State	Navy	Army
2002	Virginia Beach, VA	California	43–22	Utah	Army	Wyoming
2003	Stanford, CA	Air Force	45–37	Harvard	California	Army
2004	Stanford, CA	California	46–24	Cal Poly, SLO	Navy / Air Force	
2005	Stanford, CA	California	44–7	Utah	BYU / Navy	
2006	Stanford, CA	California	29–26	BYU	Utah / Penn State	
2007	Stanford, CA	California	37–7	BYU	Navy / Penn State	
2008	Stanford, CA	California	59–7	BYU	St. Mary's / Colorado	
2009	Stanford, CA	BYU	25–22	California	Army / San Diego State	
2010	Stanford, CA	California	19–7	BYU	Arkansas State / Army	

== Participants ==
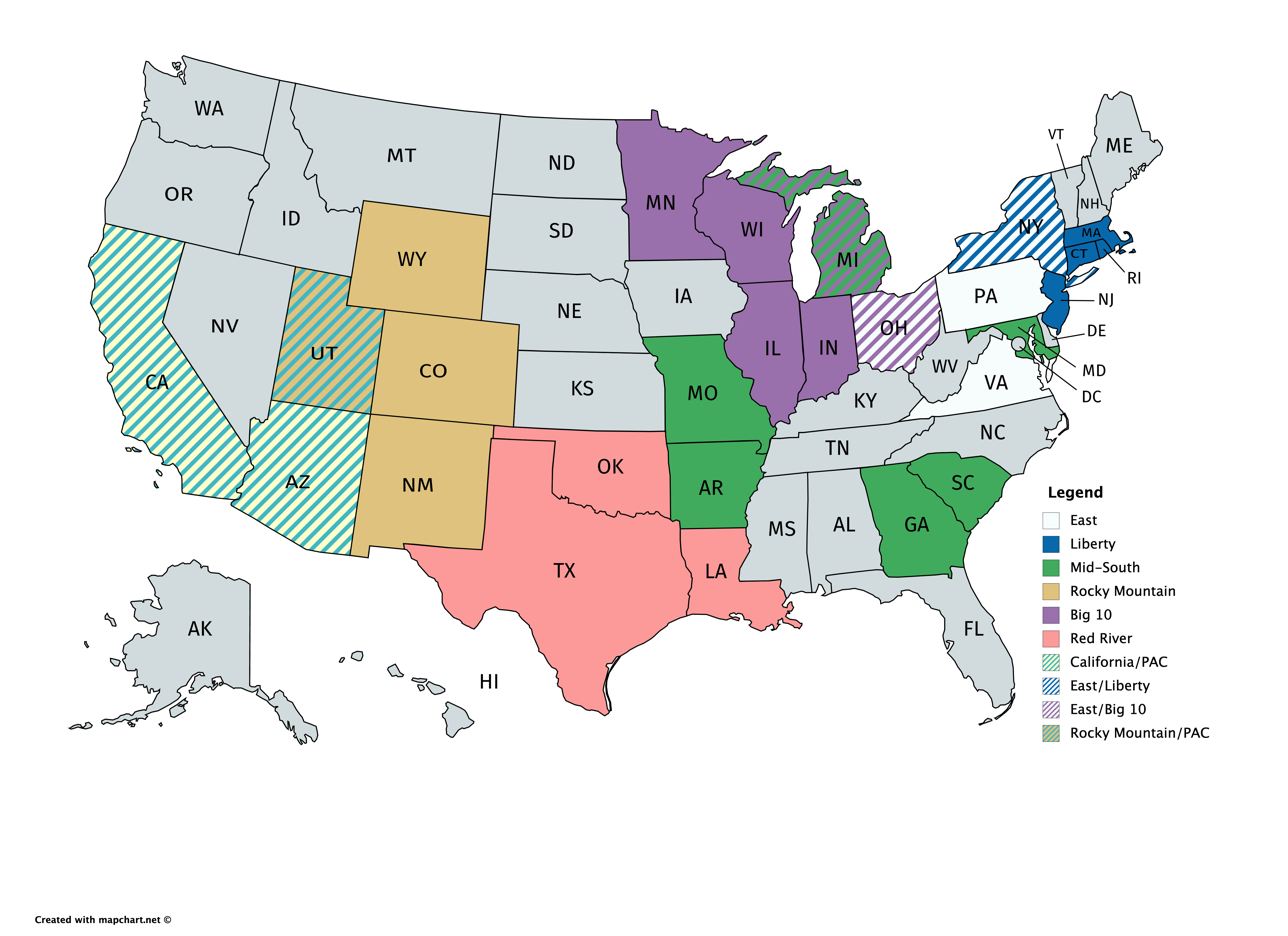
Map of Conferences in D1-A Rugby for the 2019 season

Below is the list of Division 1A conference participants for the 2025–2026 season.

=== Big Ten ===
Big Ten Conference
School	NCAA Conference	City	Coach	Stadium	Founded	Joined D1-A
Illinois	Big Ten	Champaign, Illinois	Martin Russell		1963	2013
Michigan State	Big Ten	East Lansing, Michigan	Jim Rogers	Service Road Fields	1964	2013
Ohio State	Big Ten	Columbus, Ohio	Tom Rooney		1966	2011

=== California ===
California Conference
School	NCAA Conference	City	Coach	Stadium	Founded	Joined D1-A
Cal Poly	BWC	San Luis Obispo, CA	Chris O'Brien	Cal Poly Lower Sports Complex	1965	2011
Cal State Long Beach	BWC	Long Beach, California	Jason Reynolds	Peter Sio	1974	2023
Cal University Sacramento	BSC	Sacramento, California			1964	2023
UC Davis	BWC	Davis, CA	Andy Malpass	Russell Field		2016
UC Santa Cruz	C2C	Santa Cruz, CA			1967	2023
UC Santa Barbara	BWC	Santa Barbara, CA	Neil Foote			2012
Santa Clara	WCC	Santa Clara, CA	Paul Keeler	Bellomy Field	1961	2012
San Diego State	MW	San Diego, CA	Jason Merrill	ENS 700 Field	1958	2012
University Of San Diego	WCC	San Diego, CA	Charlie Purdon	Manchester Village Field	1980	2025
Saint Mary's	WCC	Moraga, CA	Tim O'Brien	St. Mary's Stadium	1888	2011

=== Independent ===
Independent Teams
School	NCAA Conference	City	Coach	Stadium	Founded	Joined D1-A
Arizona	Big 12	Tucson, AZ	Sean Duffy	William David Sitton Field	1969	2011
California	ACC	Berkeley, CA	Jack Clark	Witter Field	1882	2011
UCLA	Big Ten	Westwood, CA	Harry Bennett	Wallis Annenberg Stadium	1934	2011
Grand Canyon University	WAC	Phoenix, Arizona	Sean O'Leary	GCU Track/Practice Soccer Field		
St Thomas University	Sun Conference	Miami Gardens, Florida	Gavin McLeavy			2025
University of Texas at El Paso	CUSA	El Paso, Texas				2024

=== Mid-West ===
Mid-South Conference
School	NCAA Conference	City	Coach	Stadium	Founded	Joined D1-A
Arkansas State	Sun Belt Conference	Jonesboro, Arkansas	Dominic Shaw	Curt Huckaby Field		2011
Davenport	GLIAC	Caledonia, Michigan	Dustin Steedman	DU Turf Field	2009	2012
Lindenwood	Ohio Valley Conference	St. Charles, Missouri	Josh Macy	Harlen C. Hunter Stadium	2011	2013
McKendree University	GLVC	Lebanon, Illinois	Cameron Wyper			2023

=== Rocky Mountain ===
Rocky Mountain Conference
School	NCAA Conference	City	Coach	Stadium	Founded	Joined D1-A
Air Force	MW	Colorado Springs, CO	John Cullen		1968	2011
BYU	Big 12	Provo, Utah	Steve St. Pierre	South Field	1962	2011
Colorado	Big 12	Boulder, Colorado	Terry Han	Kittredge Field	1967	2011
Colorado State	MW	Fort Collins, Colorado	Joe Rusert-Cuddy		1970	2011
Utah	Big 12	Salt Lake City, UT	Cameron DiLoreto	Zions Bank Stadium	1972	2011
Utah State	MW	Logan, Utah	Matt Tualamalii	USU Legacy Field	1967	2016
Utah Valley University	WAC	Orem, Utah	James Mocke	UVU Geneva Fields		2023
Wyoming	MW	Laramie, Wyoming	David Finnoff		1972	2011

=== Rugby East ===
Rugby East Conference
School	NCAA Conference	City	Coach	Stadium	Founded	Joined D1-A
Army	Patriot League	West Point, NY	Matt Sherman	Anderson Complex, Warrior Field	1961	2011
Life	(NAIA - SSAC)	Marietta, Georgia	Colton Cariaga	Lupo Family Field	1980	2011
Mary Washington	C2C	Fredericksburg, Virginia	Andrew Spencer	Doc Warner Field	1977	2019
Mount St. Mary's	MAAC	Emmitsburg, Maryland	Jay Miles	Echo Field	1973	2023
Navy	Patriot League and AAC	Annapolis, Maryland	Gavin Hickie	Prusmack Rugby Complex	1963	2011
Penn State	Big Ten	State College, PA	Zac Mizell	PSU West Campus Pitch	1962	2011
Southern Virginia	USA South	Buena Vista, Virginia	Aidyn Ferris; Marshall Ferris		2019	2023

=== Former Conferences ===
- Lonestar Conference
- PAC Rugby Conference
- Red River Conference

== Rankings ==
Final 2011 (CPD)
Rank	College	CPD
1	California	10-0
2	BYU	9-1
3	Arkansas State	8-1
4	Life University	5-2
5	St. Mary's	6-2
6	Utah	7-2
7	Cent. Washington	5-2
8	Army	7-1
9	Navy	6-2
10	Arizona State	5-2
11	Penn State	5-2
12	Arizona	4-3
13	Air Force	3-4
14	Kutztown	4-4
15	San Diego State	5-5
16	Dartmouth	3-4
17	Delaware	2-5
18	Cal Poly	3-4
19	Notre Dame	2-3
20	LSU	3-3

Final 2012 (D1A)
Rank	College
1	BYU
2	Life University
3	Arkansas State
4	St. Mary's
5	Utah
6	Army
7	Penn State
8	Air Force
9	Kutztown
10	Navy
11	UCLA
12	Central Washington
13	Delaware
14	Colorado
15	Cal Poly
16	Texas A&M
17	Wyoming
18	Arizona
19	Arizona State
20	Ohio State

Final 2013 (All College)
Rank	College
1	BYU
2	California
3	Life University
4	Arkansas St.
5	St. Mary's
6	Central Washington
7	UCLA
8	Army
9	Kutztown
10	Cal Poly
11	Navy
12	Davenport
13	Central Florida
14	Penn State
15	Lindenwood
16	Dartmouth
17	Western Washington
18	Clemson
19	Tennessee
20	Bowling Green

Final 2014 (All College)
Rank	College
1	St. Mary's
2	BYU
3	Life University
4	California
5	Arkansas State
6	UCLA
7	Central Florida
8	Navy
9	Central Washington
10	Utah
11	Kutztown
12	Lindenwood
13	Davenport
14	Arizona
15	Arizona State
16	Bowling Green
17	Santa Clara
18	Cal Poly
19	Dartmouth
20	Army

Final 2015 (All College)
Rank	College
1	BYU
2	California
3	St. Mary's
4	Life University
5	Central Washington
6	Davenport
7	Lindenwood
8	Utah
9	Army
10	Navy
11	Clemson
12	UCLA
13	Arkansas State
14	Kutztown
15	Dartmouth
16	Cal Poly
17	Penn State
18	Wheeling Jesuit
19	Colorado State
20	Air Force

Final 2016 (All College)
Rank	College
1	California
2	Life University
3	BYU
4	Central Washington
5	St. Mary's
6	Lindenwood
7	Arkansas State
8	Indiana
9	Army
10	Navy
11	Dartmouth
12	Penn State
13	Kutztown
14	UCLA
15	Utah
16	UC Davis
17	Notre Dame College
18	Davenport
19	AIC
20	Arizona

Final 2017 (All College)
Rank	College
1	Saint Mary's
2	Life University
3	BYU
4	California
5	Arkansas State
6	Indiana
7	Penn State
8	Lindenwood
9	Army
10	Navy
11	Central Washington
12	Notre Dame College
13	San Diego State
14	Utah
15	Arizona
16	UC-Davis
17	Davenport
18	Wisconsin
19	Ohio State
20	Chico State

Final 2018
Rank	College
1	Life
2	California
3	Lindenwood
4	Saint Mary's
5	Penn State
6	BYU
7	Army
8	Navy
9	Notre Dame College
10	Arkansas State
11	Arizona
12	Grand Canyon
13	Kutztown
14	Iona
15	Cal Poly
16	San Diego State
17	Davenport
18	Central Washington
19	Indiana
20	Texas A&M

Final 2019
Rank	College
1	Life
2	California
3	Saint Mary's
4	Lindenwood
5	Navy
6	Arkansas State
7	Army
8	BYU
9	Arizona
10	Penn State
11	Central Washington
12	UCLA
13	Kutztown
14	St. Bonaventure
15	Grand Canyon
16	Davenport
17	Iona
18	Wisconsin
19	Notre Dame College
20	UC Davis

Final 2022
Rank	College
1	Army
2	Saint Mary's
3	California
4	Lindenwood
5	BYU
6	Central Washington
7	Life
8	Navy
9	St. Bonaventure
10	Penn State
11	Ohio State
12	Indiana
13	Arkansas State
14	Davenport
15	Arizona
16	Grand Canyon
17	UCLA
18	Cal Poly
19	Texas A&M
20	Kutztown

Final 2023
Rank	College
1	Navy
2	California
3	Lindenwood
4	Life
5	Saint Mary's
6	BYU
7	Central Washington
8	Army
9	Davenport
10	Arizona
11	Cal Poly
12	Penn State
13	Grand Canyon
14	UCLA
15	Mary Washington
16	Arkansas State
17	Texas A&M
18	Mount St. Mary's
19	Colorado
20	Ohio State

Final 2024
Rank	College
1	Saint Mary's
2	Navy
3	Life
4	Lindenwood
5	BYU
6	Central Washington
7	Army
8	California
9	Arkansas State
10	Cal Poly
11	Arizona
12	Davenport
13	UCLA
14	Mary Washington
15	Mount St. Mary's
16	Grand Canyon
17	Colorado State
18	CSU Long Beach
19	Penn State
20	Texas A&M

Final 2025
Rank	College
1	California
2	Life
3	Lindenwood
4	Navy
5	Saint Mary's
6	Central Washington
7	Army
8	UCLA
9	Arizona
10	Cal Poly
11	Mount St. Mary's
12	BYU
13	Penn State
14	Davenport
15	Arkansas State
16	Mary Washington
17	Grand Canyon
18	Colorado State
19	Ohio State
20	Air Force
21	UC Santa Barbara
22	CSU Long Beach
23	Utah State
24	Utah
25	UC Santa Cruz

Notes:

- 2012: Cal was not included in the D1A rankings because it withdrew from D1A mid-season.
- 2013: Utah was not ranked because its rugby program was suspended by the school. Central Florida, and Bowling Green were new to the rankings; they had been ranked #17 and #19 respectively in D1-AA during the previous 2012 season.
- 2014: Army was ranked low, due in large part to the team's suspension during the season.
- 2023: No final D1A rankings were released so rankings listed above of week 1 from the 2023–24 season

Key
Green shading indicates the highest-ranked team to debut in the rankings that year.
Silver shading indicates the team that increased the largest number of places in the rankings that year.

== Seasons ==
=== 2011 season ===
Notable events

- First Season of the College Premier Division
- Funding for Cal Rugby, which previously was announced would be dropped, was restored after additional funding was raised by donors, alumni and fans.
- Life University participated in its first playoff game in school history
- BYU hosted its first rugby playoff game in club history.
- BYU and California played for the national championship for the 6th consecutive year (2006-10 in USA Rugby Collegiate Tournament, 2011 USA Rugby College Premier Division)

Regular season

Records and final standings for 2011.

Pacific Conference
#	School	Conf. record	+/-
1	x-California	7-0	+344
2	y-St. Mary's	6-1	+143
3	Cent. Washington	5-2	+55
4	San Diego State	4-3	-8
5	Cal Poly	3-4	-66
6	UCLA	2-5	-107
7	UC-Davis	2-5	-169
8	Claremont	0-7	-192

x-Conference champion
y-Qualified for playoffs
Gold = national champion
Silver = national runner-up
Bronze = national semifinalists

Western Conference
#	School	Conf. record	+/-
1	x-BYU	7-0	+376
2	y-Utah	6-1	+176
3	Arizona State	5-2	+49
4	Arizona	4-3	34
5	Air Force	3-4	-9
6	Colorado	2-4	-48
7	Colorado State	1-7	-251
8	Wyoming	0-7	-307

Mid-South Conference
#	School	Conf. record	+/-
1	x-Arkansas St.	6-0	+227
2	y-Life University	5-1	+243
3	LSU	3-3	-56
4	Texas A&M	2-4	-48
5	Tennessee	2-3	-115
6	Notre Dame	2-3	-85
7	Oklahoma	0-6	-166

East Conference
#	School	Conf. record	+/-
1	x-Army	7-0	+158
2	y-Navy	6-1	+103
3	Penn State	5-2	-20
4	Kutztown	3-4	+60
5	Dartmouth	3-4	-9
6	Delaware	2-5	-21
7	Rutgers	2-5	-133
8	Ohio State	1-6	-138

Playoffs and final

Quarterfinals (May 7–8) @Higher Seed
W1	Brigham Young	64
E2	Navy	12
MS1	Arkansas State	30
PC2	St. Mary's (CA)	17
PC1	California	43
MS2	Life University	10
E1	Army	26
W2	Utah	32

Semi-Finals (May 14); Infinity Park, Glendale, CO; ESPN3
W1	Brigham Young	36
MS1	Arkansas State	15
PC1	California	62
W2	Utah	14

Championship (May 21); Rio Tinto Stadium, Sandy, UT; ESPN3/ESPNU
W1	Brigham Young	14
PC1	California	21

After the season

- Tennessee and LSU moved from D1-A to join other SEC schools in the newly formed D1-AA Southeastern Collegiate Rugby Conference.
- Dartmouth moved from D1-A to join other Ivy League schools in the newly formed D1-AA Ivy Rugby Conference.

=== 2012 season ===
Regular season

Records and final standings for 2012.

Pacific Coast Conference
#	School	Conf. record	+/-
1	x-Saint Mary's	4-0	+154
2	y-UCLA	3-1	-32
3	Cent. Washington	2-2	-6
4	Cal Poly	1-3	-27
5	UC Davis	0-4	-89

Western Conference
#	School	Conf. record	+/-
1	x-BYU	7-0	+293
2	y-Utah	6-1	+201
3	Air Force	5-2	+127
4	Colorado	3-4	+54
5	Arizona	3-4	-75
6	Wyoming	3-4	-149
7	Arizona State	2-5	-186
8	Colorado State	0-7	-205

Mid-South Conference
#	School	Conf. record	+/-
1	x-Life University	8-0	+360
2	y-Arkansas St.	5-2	+252
3	Texas A&M	3-3	-47
4	Notre Dame	1-6	-216
5	Oklahoma	1-7	-349

East Conference
#	School	Conf. record	+/-
1	x-Army	6-0	+115
2	y-Penn State	5-1	+88
3	Kutztown	4-2	+67
4	Navy	3-3	+55
5	Ohio State	1-4	-74
6	Delaware	0-4	-61
7	Rutgers	0-5	-190

x-Conference champion
y-Qualified for playoffs

Playoffs and final

Quarterfinals (May 5) @Higher Seed
W1	Brigham Young	103
PC2	UCLA	24
MS1	Life University	75
E2	Penn State	3
E1	Army	20
MS2	Arkansas State	36
PC1	Saint Mary's	24
W2	Utah	15

Semi-Finals (May 12); Location determined by Quarterfinal results
W1	Brigham Young	26
MS1	Life University	20
MS2	Arkansas State	31
PC1	Saint Mary's	17

Championship (May 19); Rio Tinto Stadium; Sandy, UT; ESPN3
W1	Brigham Young	49
MS2	Arkansas State	42

After the season

- Nine schools from the Big-10 joined Ohio State in D1-A and formed the Big Ten Universities conference.
- Texas A&M and Oklahoma were joined by several other Texas schools to form the Allied Rugby Conference, composed mostly of Big-12 South schools.
- The Pacific Coast Conference was renamed the California Conference, several former D1-AA California schools were promoted to this conference, and Central Washington became an independent D1-A school.
- D1-AA champion Davenport was promoted to D1-A and joined the Mid-South Conference.
- UCLA, Utah, Arizona and Arizona State moved from their respective past conferences to the newly formed D1-A PAC Rugby Conference.
- BYU moved from Division 1A to the D1-AA Mountain States Conference; Navy moved from D1-A to the Atlantic Coast Rugby League; and Rutgers moved from D1-A to the Empire Rugby Conference.

=== 2013 season ===
California Conference
#	School	Conf. W/L
1	x-Saint Mary's	7-0
2	y-Cal Poly	6-1
3	San Diego St.	5-2
4	UC Davis	4-3
5	UC S. Barbara	2-5
6	Sacramento St.	2-5
7	Santa Clara	2-5
8	Stanford	0-7

West Conference
#	School	Conf. W/L
1	x-Colorado St.	4-0
2	y-Colorado	3-1
3	Wyoming	1-2
4	North. Colorado	0-3

Mid-South Conf.
#	School	Conf. W/L
1	x-Arkansas St.	3-1
2	y-Life Univ.	3-1
3	Davenport	0-4

East Conference
#	School	Conf. W/L
1	x-Army	3-0
2	y-Kutztown	2-1
3	Penn State	1-2
4	Delaware	0-3

Big Ten Univ.
#	School	Conf. W/L
1	z-Wisconsin	5-0
2	Ohio State	3-1-1
3	Illinois	4-1
4	Indiana	3-2
5	Michigan	3-2
6	Michigan St.	2-2-1
7	Iowa	2-3
8	Minnesota	2-3
9	Purdue	0-5
10	Nebraska	0-5

Allied Conference
#	School	Conf. W/L
1	z-Texas A&M	5-0
2	Texas	4-1
3	Oklahoma	3-2
4	Texas Tech	2-3
5	Sam Houston	1-4
6	Baylor	0-5

x = conference champion and automatic quarterfinal berth
y = conference runner-up and eligible for playoffs
z = conference champion and eligible for playoffs

Playoffs and final

Quarterfinals (April 27) @ Higher Seed
Cal1	St. Mary's	65
W2	Colorado	25
W1	Colorado State	19
Cal2	Cal Poly	40
M/S1	Arkansas State	31
East2	Kutztown	10
East1	Army	29
M/S2	Life University	55

Semi-Finals (May 4) @ Higher Seed
Cal1	St. Mary's	58
Cal2	Cal Poly	24
M/S1	Arkansas State	13
M/S2	Life University	18

Final (May 18); Greensboro, NC; ESPN3/ESPNU
Cal1	St. Mary's	14
M/S2	Life University	16

After the season

- The following schools, either late during the spring 2013 season or after the season, left D1A and moved to the Varsity Cup: Central Washington, Texas, Oklahoma.
- The following schools joined D1A: Wheeling Jesuit, Lindenwood.

=== 2014 season ===
Regular season

Playoffs and final

Quarterfinals (April 26) @ Higher Seed
St. Mary's	103
Santa Clara	10
Lindenwood	64
Davenport	32
Arkansas State	43
Cal Poly SLO	12
Life University	57
Colorado	3

Semifinals (May 3) @ Higher Seed
St. Mary's	72
Lindenwood	7
Arkansas State	27
Life University	34

Final (May 10); Stanford, CA; USA Rugby TV
St. Mary's	21
Life University	6

After the season

- The Allied Rugby Conference folded. Many of the schools went and formed the Red River Conference.

=== 2015 season ===
For the 2014–2015 school year, a number of conferences — particularly those in the colder northeast and upper midwest — played their regular seasons in the fall.

California Conference
#	School	Conf. W/L
1	Saint Mary's	4–0
2	Cal Poly	3–1
3	San Diego St.	2–2
4	Santa Clara	1–3
5	UC S. Barbara	0–4

West Conference
#	School	Conf. W/L
1	Air Force	6–1
2	Colorado St.	6–1
3	Wyoming	2-4-2
4	y-Colorado	2-4-2
5	New Mexico	0–6

Mid-South Conf.
#	School	Conf. W/L
1	Life Univ.	4–0
2	Davenport	1–3
3	Lindenwood	1–3

Rugby East
#	School	Conf. W/L
1	Army	6–0
2	Kutztown	5–1
3	Penn State	4–2
4	Wheeling Jesuit	3–3
5	Iona	2–4
6	St. Bonaventure	1–5
7	Buffalo	0–6

Playoffs and final

Quarterfinals (April 25)
M1	Life	64
E2	Penn State	3
W1	Air Force	12
M3	Lindenwood	59
E1	Army	24
M2	Davenport	50
C1	St. Mary's	72
Utah	26

Semifinals (May 2)
M1	Life	43
M3	Lindenwood	14
M2	Davenport	32
C1	St. Mary's	48

Final (May 9)
M1	Life	24
C1	St. Mary's	30

=== 2016 season ===
Playoffs

Quarterfinals
1	St. Mary's (CA)	77
Air Force	17
4	Utah	36
Arizona	14
2	Life Univ	44
Davenport	0
3	Lindenwood	36
Indiana	28

Semifinals
St. Mary's (CA)	81
Utah	32
Life Univ.	41
Lindenwood	7

Final
St. Mary's (CA)	20
Life Univ	24

=== 2017 season ===
Playoffs

Quarterfinals; April 22
1	St. Mary's (CA)	72
9	San Diego State	5
14	Arizona	48
16	Baylor	5
Lindenwood	20
2	Life Univ.	37
3	BYU	44
7	Indiana	17

Semifinals; April 29
1	St. Mary's (CA)	43
14	Arizona	7
2	Life Univ.	36
3	BYU	26

Final; May 6
1	St. Mary's (CA)	30
2	Life Univ	24

After the season

The Varsity Cup folded in November 2017 when the organizer, broadcast partner and a major sponsor, Penn Mutual, withdrew their support.

=== 2018 season ===
Standings

Big Ten
Pos.	Team	Record	PD	BP	Pts
1	Indiana	7–0	+150	7	35
2	Wisconsin	5–3	+159	5	25
3	Michigan State	5–2	+81	5	25
4	Illinois	5–2	+13	5	25
5	Ohio State	3–4	+111	10	22
6	(Indiana) Purdue	3–4	–16	5	17
7	Michigan	2–5	–139	1	9
8	Minnesota	1–6	–99	4	8
9	Iowa	0–5	–260	0	0

California
Pos.	Team	Record	PD	BP	Pts
1	Saint Mary's	5–0	+303	5	25
2	Cal Poly	3–2	+81	4	16
3	San Diego State	3–2	+44	4	16
4	UC Davis	3–2	+8	3	15
5	Santa Clara	1–4	–213	1	5
6	UC Santa Barbara	0–5	–223	0	0

East
Pos.	Team	Record	PD	BP	Pts
1	(Pennsylvania) Penn State	7–0	+207	7	35
2	(New York (state)) Army	4–3	+152	9	25
3	(Pennsylvania) Kutztown	3–2	+90	5	17
4	(Ohio) Notre Dame College	3–2	+54	5	17
5	(West Virginia) Wheeling Jesuit	2–4	–61	5	13
6	(New York (state)) St. Bonaventure	2–4	–126	3	11
7	(New York (state)) Buffalo	0–6	–316	0	0

Liberty (New York) – Empire
Pos.	Team	Record	PD	BP	Pts
1	Binghamton	7–1	+248	7	35
2	Cortland	6–2	+46	6	30
3	Syracuse	4–3	+31	4	20
4	Albany	4–4	+94	2	18
5	Colgate	1–5	–160	1	5
6	Brockport	0–5	–142	0	0

Liberty (New York, Jersey) – I-95
Pos.	Team	Record	PD	BP	Pts
1	Iona	6–0	+281	6	30
2	Fordham	5–2	+3	4	24
3	Delaware	2–3	–53	3	11
4	Stony Brook	1–7	–139	4	8
5	Rutgers	1–7	–118	2	5

Liberty – New England
Pos.	Team	Record	PD	BP	Pts
1	(Massachusetts) Northeastern	6–0	+182	6	30
2	(Connecticut) Uconn	4–2	+38	6	22
3	Rhode Island	4–4	+59	5	21
4	(Massachusetts) Umass	3–4	+3	5	17
5	(Massachusetts) Tufts	3–3	–56	4	16
6	(Connecticut) Fairfield	1–6	–129	4	8

Mid-South
Pos.	Team	Record	PD	BP	Pts
1	(Georgia (U.S. state)) Life	8–0	+421	7	39
2	(Missouri) Lindenwood	6–2	+199	6	31
3	Arkansas State	4–4	–120	3	19
4	(Michigan) Davenport	2–6	–180	4	11
5	(South Carolina) Clemson	0–8	–320	1	1

Pac
Pos.	Team	Record	PD	BP	Pts
1	California	5–0	+378	5	25
2	Arizona	4–1	+163	4	20
3	(California) UCLA	2–2–1	+22	3	13
4	Utah	2–2–1	–59	3	13
5	Arizona State	1–4	–197	0	4
6	(California) USC	0–5	–307	1	1

Red River
Pos.	Team	Record	PD	BP	Pts
1	Texas A&M	8–1	+232	8	40
2	(Texas) Baylor	7–2	+182	8	36
3	(Louisiana) LSU	7–1	+277	6	34
4	Oklahoma	5–4	–57	5	25
5	Texas	4–4	+29	4	20
6	Texas Tech	3–6	–68	7	19
7	Arkansas	2–5	–86	4	12
8	(Texas) TCU	1–5	–149	1	4
9	(Texas) Houston	0–9	–360	0	0

Rocky Mountain
Pos.	Team	Record	PD	BP	Pts
1	Colorado State	5–0	+260	5	25
2	(Colorado) Air Force	3–2	+108	5	17
3	Colorado	3–2	+38	4	16
4	Utah State	3–2	+17	4	16
5	Wyoming	1–4	–171	1	5
6	New Mexico	0–5	–252	1	1

Independent
Pos.	Team	Record	PD	BP	Pts
1	(Utah) BYU	5–2			

Playoffs

Sweet 16 (April 14)
1	Saint Mary's	58
16	Cal Poly	22
8	Texas A&M	12
9	Lindenwood	83
6	Indiana	0
11	Navy	47
3	California	85
14	Grand Canyon	14
2	Life	87
15	Central Washington	7
7	Colorado State	15
10	Army	52
5	Penn State	51
12	Arizona	34
4	BYU	34
13	Arkansas State	23

Elite Eight (April 21)
1	Saint Mary's	22
9	Lindenwood	43
11	Navy	27
3	California	33
2	Life	44
10	Army	10
5	Penn State	48
4	BYU	46

Final Four (April 28)
9	Lindenwood	22
3	California	43
2	Life	69
5	Penn State	14

National Championship Game (May 5)
3	California	5
2	Life	60

=== 2019 season ===
Playoffs

Sweet 16 (April 13)	Elite Eight (April 20)
1	California	141
8	UC Davis	3
1	California	61
4	Arizona	16
4	Arizona	28
5	Central Washington	19
WEST
3	BYU	50
6	UCLA	12
3	BYU	12
2	Saint Mary's	71
2	Saint Mary's	74
7	Grand Canyon	12
1	Life	34
8	Penn State	3
1	Life	40
5	Navy	25
4	Oklahoma	0
5	Navy	71
EAST
3	Wisconsin	0
6	Lindenwood	97
6	Lindenwood	22
7	Arkansas State	18
2	Army	24
7	Arkansas State	31

Final Four (April 27)
1	California	28
2	Saint Mary's	24
1	Life	27
6	Lindenwood	19

National Championship Game (May 4)
1	California	26
1	Life	29

=== 2022 season ===
Standings

Big Ten
Pos.	Team	Record	PD	BP	Pts
1	Ohio State	5–1	+208	7	27
2	Indiana	5–1	+142	4	24
3	Michigan State	4–2	+43	4	20
4	Illinois	3–3	-23	4	16
5	Michigan	3–3	-30	2	14
6	(Indiana) Purdue	1–5	–108	2	6
7	Wisconsin	0–6	–232	1	1

California
Pos.	Team	Record	PD	BP	Pts
1	Saint Mary's	4–0	+243	4	20
2	Cal Poly	4–1	+166	4	20
3	Grand Canyon University	3–0	+80	3	15
4	Santa Clara	2–3	-111	3	11
5	UC Santa Barbara	1–4	-139	2	6
6	UC Davis	1–3	–80	1	5
7	San Diego State	0–4	–159	2	2

Mid-South
Pos.	Team	Record	PD	BP	Pts
1	(Missouri) Lindenwood	6–0	+142	4	28
2	(Georgia (U.S. state)) Life	4–2	+17	1	17
3	Arkansas State	2–4	–59	2	10
4	(Michigan) Davenport	0–6	–100	3	3

Red River
Pos.	Team	Record	PD	BP	Pts
1	Texas A&M	6–0	+190	5	29
2	Oklahoma	5–2	+69	3	23
3	(Texas) Baylor	3–4	+20	6	18
4	Texas	3–4	–50	4	16
5	North Texas	0–7	-229	1	1

Rocky Mountain West
Pos.	Team	Record	PD	BP	Pts
1	(Utah) BYU	4–0	+142	4	20
2	Utah Valley	2–2	-58	2	10
3	Utah State	0–4	-205	0	0

Playoffs

Round 1 (April 9)
4	Central Washington	62
5	Cal Poly	17
3	BYU	59
6	Arizona	13
4	Life	26
5	Navy	13
3	Texas A&M	w/o
6	Arkansas State	w/o

Elite Eight (April 16)
1	California	43
4	Central Washington	26
WEST
2	Saint Mary's	24
3	BYU	22
1	Army	39
4	Life	18
EAST
2	Lindenwood	41
6	Arkansas State	10

Final Four (April 23)
1	California	26
2	Saint Mary's	35
1	Army	19
2	Lindenwood	14

National Championship Game (April 30)
2	Saint Mary's	8
1	Army	20

=== 2023 season ===
Standings

Independent
Team	Record	PD
(Washington (state)) Central Washington	8–1	+174

Mid-South
Pos.	Team	Record	PD	BP	Pts
1	(Missouri) Lindenwood	5–1	+181	3	23
2	(Georgia (U.S. state)) Life	4–2	+61	3	19
3	(Michigan) Davenport	3–3	–41	0	12
4	Arkansas State	0–6	–101	1	1

Pac Rugby Conference
Pos.	Team	Record	PD	BP	Pts
1	California	3–0	+169	3	15
2	Arizona	2–1	+76	2	10
3	(California) UCLA	1–2	–5	3	7
4	Utah	0–3	–240	0	0

Rugby East (North)
Pos.	Team	Record	BP	Pts
1	(Maryland) Navy	5–0	3	23
2	(New York (state)) Army	4–1	5	20
3	(New York (state)) St. Bonaventure	3–2	2	14
4	(Ohio) Notre Dame College	2–3	2	10
5	(Pennsylvania) Kutztown	1–4	3	7
6	(Pennsylvania) Penn State	0–5	1	1

Big Ten
Pos.	Team	Record
1	Indiana (W)	5 — 0
2	Ohio State (E)	4 — 1
3	Notre Dame	4 — 1
4	Illinois	3 — 2
5	Wisconsin	3 — 2
6	Michigan State	2 — 3
7	Michigan	1 — 4
8	Purdue	0 — 5

Red River
Pos.	Team	Record	Pts	Pts Diff
1	Texas A&M	6–0	30	+493
2	Texas	4–2	20	+30
3	(Texas) Baylor	3–2	15	-22
4	North Texas	2–3	10	-172
5	Oklahoma	1–4	7	-79
6	Texas Tech	0–5	1	-250

Playoffs

Round 1 (April 8)
4	BYU	71
5	Arizona	33
3	California	82
6	Cal Poly	15
4	Army	36
5	Davenport	34
3	Life	82
6	Texas A&M	0

Elite Eight (April 15)
1	Central Washington	31
4	BYU	62
WEST
2	Saint Mary's	28
3	California	29
1	Navy	30
4	Army	6
EAST
2	Lindenwood	29
3	Life	8

Final Four (April 22)
4	BYU	31
3	California	55
1	Navy	12
2	Lindenwood	10

National Championship Game (May 6)
3	California	22
1	Navy	28

=== 2024 season ===
Standings

Rugby East (North)
Pos.	Team	Record	BP	Pts
1	(Maryland) Navy	7–0	4	32
2	(Georgia (U.S. state)) Life	5–1–0	6	26
3	(Ohio) Notre Dame College	4–1–1	3	21
4	(Maryland) Mount St. Mary's	4–2	2	18
5	(New York (state)) St. Bonaventure	4–3	2	18
6	(Virginia) University of Mary Washington	3–3	4	16
7	(New York (state)) Army	2–4–1	4	14
6	(Pennsylvania) Kutztown	2–5	6	14
9	(North Carolina) Queens	2–4	3	11
10	Southern Virginia	1–5	3	7
11	(Pennsylvania) Penn State	0–6	3	3

Big Ten
Big Ten East
Pos.	Team	Record	Points
1	Ohio State	3–1	12
2	Michigan State	2–0	8
3	Michigan	1–4	5
4	(Indiana) Notre Dame	0–3	2
Big Ten West
Pos.	Team	Record	Points
1	Indiana	4–0	16
2	Illinois	1–1	4
3	Wisconsin	1–1	4
4	(Indiana) Purdue	1–2	4

Mid-West
Pos.	Team	Record	BP	Pts
1	(Missouri) Lindenwood	3–0	2	14
2	(Michigan) Davenport	2–1	3	11
3	(Michigan) Adrian	0–2	0	0
4	(Illinois) McKendree	0–2	0	0

California
Pos.	Team	Record	PD	BP	Pts
1	(California) Cal Poly	7–1	+422	8	36
2	(California) Saint Mary's	7–0	+525	7	35
3	(California) UC Santa Barbara	5–3	+118	5	25
4	(California) Long Beach	5–2	+66	5	25
5	(California) UC Davis	4–4	–144	4	20
6	(California) San Diego State	3–5	–132	6	18
7	(California) Santa Cruz	1–5–1	–291	2	8
6	(California) Santa Clara	1–7	–266	3	7
9	(California) Sacramento	0–1–6	–298	1	3

Independent
Team	Record	PD
(Washington (state)) Central Washington	8–3	+79
(Arizona) Grand Canyon University	4–4	+63

Pac Rugby Conference
Pos.	Team	Record	PD	BP	Pts
1	California	3–0	+176	3	15
2	(California) UCLA	2–1	+29	2	10
3	Arizona	1–2	–38	2	7
4	Utah	0–3	–170	1	1

Rocky Mountain
Team	Record	PD
(Utah) BYU	5–0	+339

Playoffs

Sweet 16 (April 6)	Elite Eight (April 13)
1	Saint Mary's	78
8	Grand Canyon	7
1	Saint Mary's	34
4	California	16
4	California	70
5	Cal Poly	13
WEST
3	BYU	48
6	UCLA	15
3	BYU	40
2	Central Washington	26
2	Central Washington	23
7	Arizona	17
1	Navy	41
8	University of Mary Washington	7
1	Navy	57
4	Arkansas State	5
4	Arkansas State	23
5	Davenport	17
EAST
3	Lindenwood	26
6	Mount St. Mary's	0
3	Lindenwood	10
2	Life	25
2	Life	24
7	Army	17

Final Four (April 20)
1	Saint Mary's	46
3	BYU	31
1	Navy	27
2	Life	17

National Championship Game (May 4)
1	Saint Mary's	26
1	Navy	22

=== 2025 season ===
Standings

Rugby East
Pos.	Team	Record	PD	BP	Pts
1	(Maryland) Navy	6–1	+169	7	31
2	(Georgia (U.S. state)) Life	6–1	+252	6	30
3	(New York (state)) Army	6–1	+100	6	30
4	(Maryland) Mount St. Mary's	5–2	+49	5	25
5	(North Carolina) Queens	5–2	+48	4	24
6	(New York (state)) St. Bonaventure	4–3	–1	3	19
7	(Virginia) University of Mary Washington	3–4	+40	5	17
8	(Ohio) Walsh University	2–5	–52	4	12
9	(Pennsylvania) Penn State	2–5	–63	3	11
10	(Pennsylvania) Kutztown	2–5	–65	3	11
11	(North Carolina) Belmont Abbey College	1–6	–66	2	6
12	Southern Virginia	0–7	–381	0	0

Big Ten
Big Ten East
Pos.	Team	Record	PD	BP	Points
1	(Indiana) Notre Dame	3–0	+63	3	15
2	Ohio State	2–1	+84	4	12
3	Michigan State	1–2	–75	0	4
4	Michigan	0–3	–75	0	3
Big Ten West
Pos.	Team	Record	PD	BP	Points
1	Indiana	3–0	+101	2	14
2	Wisconsin	2–1	+49	2	10
3	Illinois	1–2	+17	2	6
4	(Indiana) Purdue	0–3	–67	0	0

Mid-West
Pos.	Team	Record	BP	Pts
1	(Missouri) Lindenwood			
2	(Michigan) Davenport			
3	Arkansas State			
4	(Michigan) Adrian			
5	(Illinois) McKendree			

California
Pos.	Team	Record	PD	BP	Pts
1	(California) Saint Mary's	8–0	+617	8	40
2	(California) Cal Poly	7–1	+553	9	37
3	(California) UC Santa Barbara	6–2	+64	6	30
4	(California) Long Beach	5–3	+49	5	25
5	(California) San Diego State	3–5	–239	4	16
6	(California) Sacramento State	2–6	–208	5	13
7	(California) Santa Cruz	2–6	–235	5	13
8	(California) Santa Clara	2–6	–359	5	10
9	(California) UC Davis	1–7	–270	3	7

Independent
Team	Record	PD
Arizona	8–6	
California	11–1	
(Washington (state)) Central Washington	6–2	
(Arizona) Grand Canyon University	5–4	
(California) UCLA	4–4	
University of Texas at El Paso		
Texas A&M		

Rocky Mountain
Team	Record	PD	BP	Pts
(Utah) BYU	5–0	+353	5	25
Colorado State	5–0	+216	4	24
(Colorado) Air Force	3–2	+4	3	15
Utah State	2–3	–107	2	10
University of Wyoming	2–3	–144	0	8
University of Colorado	1–4	–62	4	8
Utah Valley	1–4	–148	2	6
University of Utah	1–4	–109	1	5

Playoffs

Sweet 16 (April 5)	Elite Eight (April 12)
1	California	76
8	Colorado State	7
1	California	74
5	Arizona	45
4	Cal Poly	19
5	Arizona	47
WEST
3	Central Washington	53
6	BYU	26
3	Central Washington	48
2	Saint Mary's	53
2	Saint Mary's	24
7	UCLA	17
1	Life	92
8	Davenport	7
1	Life	18
4	Army	17
4	Army	25
5	Mount St. Mary's	15
EAST
3	Lindenwood	24
6	Arkansas State	7
3	Lindenwood	10
2	Navy	3
2	Navy	45
7	Penn State	7

Final Four (April 19)
1	California	38
2	Saint Mary's	27
1	Life	31
3	Lindenwood	7

National Championship Game (May 3)
1	California	55
1	Life	38

=== 2026 season ===
Playoffs

Sweet 16 (April 11)	Elite Eight (April 18)
1	California	83
8	San Diego	5
1	California	96
4	BYU	12
4	BYU	33
5	Cal Poly	19
WEST
3	Arizona	41
6	Grand Canyon	35
3	Arizona	19
2	Saint Mary's	48
2	Saint Mary's	69
7	Colorado State	10
1	Navy	40
8	Mary Washington	11
1	Navy	38
4	Army	10
4	Army	42
5	Arkansas State	17
EAST
3	Life	61
6	Mount St. Mary's	5
3	Life	31
2	Lindenwood	24
2	Lindenwood	31
7	Penn State	10

Final Four (April 25)
1	California	59
2	Saint Mary's	19
1	Navy	35
3	Life	21

National Championship Game (May 2)
1	California	36
1	Navy	22

== Rudy Scholz Award Winners ==
The Rudy Scholz award goes to the best male Division 1-A rugby player in the country. Below is a list of all prior recipients:

- 2016: Dylan Audsley, Saint Mary's
- 2017: Bryce Campbell, Indiana
- 2018: Connor McNerney, Navy
- 2019: Harley Wheeler, Life University
- 2020: Payton Telea-Ilalio, Saint Mary's
- 2021: Emmanuel Albert, Lindenwood
- 2022: Larry Williams, West Point
- 2023: Lewis Gray, Navy
- 2024: Wyatt Parry, BYU
- 2025: Oscar Treacy, CWU
- 2026: Solomon Williams, California

== See also ==
- College rugby
- Collegiate Rugby Championship
- Varsity Cup Championship
- Intercollegiate sports team champions
- United States national under-20 rugby union team
- National Collegiate Rugby Championship results
