= University of Michigan Rugby Football Club =

American university rugby club

University of Michigan
- Full name: University of Michigan Rugby Football Club
- Union: National Collegiate Rugby
- Nickname: Wolverines
- Founded: 1959; 67 years ago
- Location: Ann Arbor, Michigan
- Ground(s): Mitchell Field
- President: Kiyan Jacobs
- Coach: Christian Mentzer
- Captain(s): Jack Regan and Max Nelson
- League: Big 10
| 1st kit | 2nd kit |

Official website
- www.mrugby.com

The University of Michigan Rugby Football Club (UMRFC) is a rugby union club at the University of Michigan in Ann Arbor. The UMRFC currently plays in the Big Ten conference at the D1A level, the highest level of collegiate play under National Collegiate Rugby.

The Wolverines largely rely on talent drawn from within the United States; however, foreign students will often add valuable contributions while studying abroad in Ann Arbor. Many players join with little or no previous experience in rugby. Despite this, the UMRFC has won a number of championships and produced several athletes that have gone on to play rugby at a professional level.

According to their Player Handbook, UMRFC's mission is "to develop upstanding student athletes and men through the sport of Rugby. To play the game with inspiration, cultivate a close knit family within the club, and promote commitment, discipline, and respect on and off of the field." Reinforcing these values, the Wolverine's work a variety of community service and charity events.

== History ==
The team began as the Michigan Rugby Football Club, founded in 1959. The club was composed of U of M undergraduate students, graduate students, staff, and alumni as well as Ann Arbor community members, maintaining this composition for 40 years. In January 2000, the University of Michigan Rugby Football Club was formed and restricted to current undergraduate (and in some cases, graduate) students at U of M.

In-depth club history, including all game results since 1959, can be found at mrugby.com - All players since 1959 can be found in "The Ledger" on the same site.

== Club honors ==
- Collegiate Rugby Championship Quarterfinalists: 2014, 2015, 2024
- Big Ten Champions: 2013
- Midwest championship and National Quarter-Finalist: 2007-2008
- Midwest Championship and National Semi-Finalist: 2004-2005
- Senior Men National Championship: 1995
- National Third Place: 1980

== Results ==
Full results since 1959

See the current schedule at the team's official website.

Big Ten Championship
Conference

Fall 2024 Schedule/Results
| Date | Opponent | Result | Location |
|---|---|---|---|
| 8/23/24 | Cincinnati | W 14-5 | Ann Arbor, MI |
| 8/30/24 | Bowling Green | L 12-47 | Bowling Green, OH |
| 9/6/24 | Trine | W 69-20 | Ann Arbor, MI |
| 9/20/24 | Notre Dame | L 19-31 | South Bend, IN |
| 9/28/24 | Wisconsin | L 12-26 | Ann Arbor, MI |
| 10/18/24 | Ohio State | | Columbus, MI |
| 10/25/24 | Michigan State | | Ann Arbor, MI |
| 11/2/24 | Big Ten Semis | | TBD |
| 11/9/24 | Big Ten Finals | | South Bend, IN |

== Past and current captains and presidents ==
| Season | Captain | Assistant Captain |
|---|---|---|
| Winter 2026 | Max Nelson/Jack Regan | |
| Fall 2025 | Luke Zana/Max Nelson/Jack Regan | |
| Winter 2025 | Alex Olsen/Matt Daines/Shea Loughnane/Luke Zana | |
| Fall 2024 | Alex Olsen/Matt Daines/Shea Loughnane/Luke Zana | |
| Winter 2024 | Tommy Hendricks | Shea Loughnane/Armen Vartanian |
| Fall 2023 | Tommy Hendricks | Shea Loughnane/Armen Vartanian |
| Winter 2023 | George Janke | |
| Fall 2022 | Braden Loughnane/George Janke | |
| Winter 2022 | Braden Loughnane/George Janke | |
| Fall 2021 | Carter Lyon | Nathan Feldman |
| Winter 2020 | Jack Vecchio | Luke Boll |
| Fall 2020 | Jack Vecchio | Jordan Perez |
| 2019–2020 | Tanner Visco | Davis Grimm |
| 2018–2019 | Jamie Demers | Tanner Visco |
| 2017–2018 | Justin Malin | Ron Marine |
| 2016–2017 | Jeremy Reid | Zach Burns (Jr.) |
| 2015–2016 | Zach Burns (Boo) | Cole Van Harn |
| 2014–2015 | Joel Conzelmann | Sequoyah Burke-Combs |
| 2013–2014 | Kenny Andutan | Chris Padmos |
| 2012–2013 | Michael Lacivita | Grady Bridges |
| 2011–2012 | James Wilber | Matthew Crabtree |
| 2010–2011 | Charles Berklich | James Wilber |
| 2009–2010 | Charles Berklich | James Wilber |
| 2008–2009 | Aaron Dodd | Max Mikulec |
| 2007–2008 | Aaron Dodd | Jake Leederkerken |
| 2006–2007 | Karl Seibert | Nick Harris/Dan Kuriluk |
| 2005–2006 | Matt Trenary | Josh Rubin |
| 2004–2005 | Andrew Finn | Wes Farrow |
| 2003–2004 | Craig Williams | |
| 2002–2003 | Andrew Marcus | Craig Williams |
| 2001–2002 | Mike Livanos | Andrew Marcus |
| 2000–2001 | Mike Livanos | Andrew Marcus |
| 1999–2000 | Ryan Gaylor | |
| 1998–1999 | Scott Salamango | |
| 1997–1998 | Scott Salamango | |
| 1996–1997 | Scott Salamango | |
| 1995–1996 | Mike Springs | |

| Year | President | Vice President |
|---|---|---|
| 2026 | Kiyan Jacobs | Riley Gauthier |
| 2025 | Zachary Small | Riley Gauthier |
| 2024 | Ryan Grover | Luke Zana |
| 2023 | James Willcox | Timothy Zamarro |
| 2022 | Thomas Hendricks | Luke Boll |
| 2021 | George Janke | Braden Loughnane |
| 2020 | Jacob Bodner | Nick Campbell |
| 2019 | Mahmoud El-Naggar | Jacob Bodner |
| 2018 | Lyric Kleber | Jamie Demers |
| 2017 | Nate Fisher | Justin Malin |
| 2016 | Matt Kasten | Travis Sawyer |
| 2015 | Chening Duker | Jackson Wagner |
| 2014 | Jared Bosma | John Palladino |
| 2013 | Ian Etheart | CJ Stock |
| 2012 | Ian Etheart | Karl Boothman |
| 2011 | Andrew Swain | Michael Lacivita |
| 2010 | Oluwatobi Eboda | Andrew Swain |
| 2009 | Niall O'Kane | Matthew Crabtree |
| 2008 | Jake Leederkerken | Kevin Owens |
| 2007 | Eddie Schehr | Evan Barclay |
| 2006 | Evan Barclay | |
| 2005 | Brent Barna | Matt Russell |
| 2004 | Aaron Aragona | Josh Rubin |
| 2003 | Kurt Sarsfield | |
| 2002 | Kevin Barlow | Wes Farrow |
| 2001 | Mike Cavnar | Wes Farrow |
| 2000 | Aaron Bennett | Mike Cavnar |
| 1999 | Aaron Bennett | Ryan Gaylor |
| 1998 | Aaron Bennett | Michael Olzevski |
| 1997 | Mike Springs | Aaron Bennett |
| 1996 | Mike Springs | |
| 1995 | Mike Springs | |

== Notable alumni ==
- Sequoyah Burke-Combs - Seattle Seawolves (Major League Rugby)
- Cole Van Harn - Seattle Seawolves (Major League Rugby)
- Peter Donnelly - professor of statistical science
- Harvey Schiller - sports executive
- Bob Woodruff - television journalist
- Bert Sugar - boxing journalist

== See also ==
- College rugby
- Division 1-A Rugby
- Michigan RFC
