= SCRC =

SCRC may refer to:

- The Scottish Commission for the Regulation of Care, a commission of regulation and inspection of all care services in Scotland
- Southeastern Collegiate Rugby Conference, a U.S. collegiate rugby conference
- Special Collections Research Center at the College of William & Mary
