= 2024 Division 1-A Rugby Championship =

Rugby union competition

Division 1-A Rugby Championship

Tournament details
- Countries: United States
- Tournament format(s): knockout
- Date: 6 April – 4 May 2024

Tournament statistics
- Teams: 16
- Matches played: 15
- Tries scored: 117 (7.8 per match)

Final
- Champions: Saint Mary's (4th title)
- Runners-up: Navy

The 2024 Division 1-A Rugby Championship is the twelfth season of the Division 1-A Rugby championship, the annual university rugby union competition run by USA Rugby involving the top sixteen college teams in the United States. Navy entered as defending champions having won their first Championship, capping a perfect 18–0 2023 season. St. Mary's beat Navy in the final 26–22 in the final to secure their fourth championship.

== Teams ==
Sixteen clubs from the six major conferences compete in the 2024 National Championship playoffs.

The distribution of teams is:

- PAC Rugby Conference: three teams
- California: two teams
- Rocky Mountain: one team
- Independent: three teams
- Rugby East: five teams
- Mid-West Conference: two teams

The following teams qualified for the tournament.

PAC Rugby Conference	California	Rocky Mountain	Independent	Rugby East	Mid-West
Arizona; California; UCLA	Cal Poly; Saint Mary's	BYU	Arkansas State; Central Washington; Grand Canyon	Army; Life; Mount St. Mary's; Navy; University of Mary Washington	Davenport; Lindenwood

== Team locations ==
Locations
– East, – West

== Standings ==
Rugby East
Pos.	Team	Record	BP	Pts
1	(Maryland) Navy	7–0	4	32
2	(Georgia (U.S. state)) Life	5–1–0	6	26
3	(Ohio) Notre Dame College	4–1–1	3	21
4	(Maryland) Mount St. Mary's	4–2	2	18
5	(New York (state)) St. Bonaventure	4–3	2	18
6	(Virginia) University of Mary Washington	3–3	4	16
7	(New York (state)) Army	2–4–1	4	14
6	(Pennsylvania) Kutztown	2–5	6	14
9	(North Carolina) Queens	2–4	3	11
10	Southern Virginia	1–5	3	7
11	(Pennsylvania) Penn State	0–6	3	3

Big Ten
Big Ten East
Pos.	Team	Record	Points
1	Ohio State	3–1	12
2	Michigan State	2–0	8
3	Michigan	1–4	5
4	(Indiana) Notre Dame	0–3	2
Big Ten West
Pos.	Team	Record	Points
1	Indiana	4–0	16
2	Illinois	1–1	4
3	Wisconsin	1–1	4
4	(Indiana) Purdue	1–2	4

Mid-West
Pos.	Team	Record	BP	Pts
1	(Missouri) Lindenwood	3–0	2	14
2	(Michigan) Davenport	2–1	3	11
3	(Michigan) Adrian	0–2	0	0
4	(Illinois) McKendree	0–2	0	0

California
Pos.	Team	Record	PD	BP	Pts
1	(California) Cal Poly	7–1	+422	8	36
2	(California) Saint Mary's	7–0	+525	7	35
3	(California) UC Santa Barbara	5–3	+118	5	25
4	(California) Long Beach	5–2	+66	5	25
5	(California) UC Davis	4–4	–144	4	20
6	(California) San Diego State	3–5	–132	6	18
7	(California) Santa Cruz	1–5–1	–291	2	8
8	(California) Santa Clara	1–7	–266	3	7
9	(California) Sacramento	0–1–6	–298	1	3

Independent
Team	Record	PD
(Washington (state)) Central Washington	8–3	+79
(Arizona) Grand Canyon University	4–4	+63

Pac Rugby Conference
Pos.	Team	Record	PD	BP	Pts
1	California	3–0	+176	3	15
2	(California) UCLA	2–1	+29	2	10
3	Arizona	1–2	–38	2	7
4	Utah	0–3	–170	1	1

Rocky Mountain
Team	Record	PD
(Utah) BYU	5–0	+339

== Bracket ==
Playoffs

Sweet 16 (April 6)	Elite Eight (April 13)
1	Saint Mary's	78
8	Grand Canyon	7
1	Saint Mary's	34
4	California	16
4	California	70
5	Cal Poly	13
WEST
3	BYU	48
6	UCLA	15
3	BYU	40
2	Central Washington	26
2	Central Washington	23
7	Arizona	17
1	Navy	41
8	University of Mary Washington	7
1	Navy	57
4	Arkansas State	5
4	Arkansas State	23
5	Davenport	17
EAST
3	Lindenwood	26
6	Mount St. Mary's	0
3	Lindenwood	10
2	Life	25
2	Life	24
7	Army	17

Final Four (April 20)
1	Saint Mary's	46
3	BYU	31
1	Navy	27
2	Life	17

National Championship Game (May 4)
1	Saint Mary's	26
1	Navy	22

=== Round 1 ===
5 April 2024

Arkansas State	23–17	(Michigan) Davenport
Try: E Roode (2); Con: W Day (1/1); Madden (1/1); Pen: W Day (3/4)	Report	Try: J Bennie; S Pitout; T Kambani; Con: van der Westhuizen (1/3)

Curt Huckaby Field, Jonesboro, Arkansas

5 April 2024

BYU (Utah)	48–15	(California) UCLA
Try: T Hammer (2); W Parry (2); L Clark; J Campbell; Z Mendenhall; Con: T Hammer (5); Pen: T Hammer (1)	Report	Try: C Carter; S McMillan; Con: J Cox (1); Pen: J Cox (1)

South Field, Provo, Utah

6 April 2024

Saint Mary's (California)	78–7	(Arizona) Grand Canyon
Try: S Ofa (2); T Pappas; J Negrete; M Storti (2); K Matu; JB Wilson; M Abbes; N Deegan; E Younger; C Lujan; Con: M Storti (9/13)	Report	Try: L Jackson; Con: (1/1)

Saint Mary's Stadium, Moraga, California

6 April 2024

California	70–13	(California) Cal Poly
Try: O Newall (2) 5' c 69 m C Seastrand 12' c E Weigold (3) 24' m, 60' m, 78' m M de Beer 27' m, 52' m J Kirsten (2) 32' c, 54' m B Dowgiewicz 74' c E Cook 75'; Con: R Santos (3) 5', 12', 32'; J Kirsten (1) 74'	Report	Try: D Caillouel 40' c Q Tindel 51' m Pen: C Baker 10'

Witter Rugby Field, Berkeley, California

6 April 2024

Central Washington (Washington (state))	23–17	Arizona
Try: O Treacy (2) 18' m, 47' m D Ferrington 40' c Con: J Tregoning (1/3) 40'; Pen: J Tregoning (2) 41'	Report	Try: A Turpen c C Blair m T Champion 79' m Con: T Champion (1/3)

Tomlinson Stadium, Ellensburg, Washington

6 April 2024

Navy (Maryland)	41–7	(Virginia) University of Mary Washington
Try: J Beitia; JD Bengston; A Baublitz; J Cornelius; R Krieger; R Hotaling; Con: R Krieger (4/6); Pen: R Krieger (1)	Report	Try: A Hayward; Con: S Schefferman (1/1)

Prusmack Rugby Complex, Annapolis, Maryland

Notes:

- The Mids improved to 11–0 at home on the season outscoring opponents, 606–110
- Beitia scored the fifth-fastest try to begin a game in team history
- Krieger led Navy with 16 points in the win, which is the eighth-most points scored in a single game in program history
- Krieger's effort helped him pass 300-points scored in his career.

6 April 2024

Lindenwood (Missouri)	26–0	(Maryland) Mount St. Mary's
Try: AM Tapia 8' c J de Jager 28' c D Cathcart(2) 50' c, 68' m Con: B Forward (3) 9', 29', 51'	Report

Lindenwood Track Complex, St. Charles, Missouri

6 April 2024

Life (Georgia (U.S. state))	24–17	(New York (state)) Army
Try: P Simamane 11' c L Ballinger 30' c S Lenzsch 63' c Con: B Crane (3/3) 12', 31' 64'; Pen: B Crane (1) 73'	Report	Try: B Kemp; Pen: J Haley (4)

Lupo Family Field, Marietta, Georgia

=== Quarter-finals ===
13 April 2024

Saint Mary's (California)	34–16	California
Try: K Matu 11' m D Besag 32' c JT Toia’ivao 40'; K Kayoshi 43'; S Pongi 65'; Con: Storti (3/5) 33', 44', 66'; Pen: M Storti (1)	Report	Try: R Santos 71' m C Tomasin 78' m Pen: K O'Connell (2) 13', 35'

Saint Mary's Stadium, Moraga, California

13 April 2024

Central Washington (Washington (state))	24–40	(Utah) BYU
	Report	Try: J Tenney (2); L Clark; Con: T Hammer (5)

Tomlinson Stadium, Ellensburg, Washington

13 April 2024

Navy (Maryland)	57–5	Arkansas State
Try: W Webb (2) 8' m, 14' c B Haugh (2) 34' c, 44'; R Krieger 47' c A Taylor 55' c E Soeder 64' c A Ganse 66' c Con: R Krieger (7/8) 15', 35', 45', 48', 56', 65', 67'; Pen: R Krieger (1) 80'	Report	Try: 21' m Con: (0/1)

Prusmack Rugby Complex, Annapolis, Maryland

Notes:

- Krieger's point total helped him become the first mid to score more than 200 points in a single season (219)

13 April 2024

Life (Georgia (U.S. state))	25–10	(Missouri) Lindenwood
Try: S Kramlich 8' c S Matthysen 58' c W Piggins 73' m Con: B Crane (2/3) 9', 59'; Pen: B Crane (2) 16', 42'	Report	Try: C Wallace 5' c Con: B Forward (1/1) 5'; Pen: B Forward (1) 27'

Lupo Family Field, Marietta, Georgia

=== Semi-finals ===
20 April 2024

Saint Mary's (California)	46–31	(Utah) BYU
Try: D Besag (2); S Pongi; I Toia'ivao; E Storti (2); K Kayoshi; H Modlin; Con: M Storti (4/8)	Report	Try: C Semu c Tenney (2); Parry; Worthington; Con: T Hammer (3/5)

Saint Mary's Stadium, Moraga, California
Attendance: ~3,000

20 April 2024

Navy (Maryland)	27–17	Life (Georgia (U.S. state))
Try: W Webb 10' c J Cornelius 38' c I Bullock 56'; Con: R Krieger (3/3) 11', 39', 57'; Pen: R Krieger (2) 33', 65'	Report	Try: K Hoffman 28' c penalty try 65'; Con: B Crane 29'; Pen: B Crane 23'

Prusmack Rugby Complex, Annapolis, Maryland

=== Final ===
4 May 2024

Saint Mary's (California)	26–22	(Maryland) Navy
Try: D Besag 2' c E Storti 5' c J Battle Wilson 25' c S Pongi 42' m Con: M. Storti (3/4) 2', 6', 26'	Report	Try: B Haugh 35' m W Webb 50' c V Schmitz 67' c Con: Krieger (2/3) 51', 68'; Pen: Krieger (1) 70'

SaberCats Stadium, Houston, Texas

== Rudy Scholz Award ==
=== Winner ===
- Wyatt Parry – BYU

=== Finalists ===
- Eduan Van Heerden – Lindenwood
- Wyatt Parry – BYU
- Evan Roode – Arkansas State
- Dom Besag – Saint Mary's

=== Nominations ===
- Caden Crist – Cal
- Calvin Liulamaga – CWU
- Cole Semu – BYU
- Dom Besag – Saint Mary's
- Eduan Van Heerden – Lindenwood
- EJ Freeman – Arizona
- Erich Storti – Saint Mary's
- Evan Roode – Arkansas State
- Hayden McKay – Mount St. Mary's
- Ishma-eel Safodien – Life
- Jack Phillips – Kentucky
- Oliver Corbett – Brown
- Peyton Wall – Indiana
- Remy Thomson – Notre Dame College
- Roanin Krieger – Navy
- Tiaan Mosconi – West Point
- Vaughn Schmitz – Navy
- Wyatt Parry – BYU

== 2023–2024 First Team All Americans ==
- Emilio Shea – University of California – Berkeley
- Cade Crist – University of California – Berkeley
- Connor Devos – Lindenwood University
- Alejandro Martinez Tapia – Lindenwood University
- Will Sherman – University of California – Los Angeles
- Logan Ballinger – Life University
- Kaipono Kaioshi – Saint Mary's College
- Ben Haugh – United States Naval Academy
- Solomon Williams – University of California – Berkeley
- Wyatt Parry – Brigham Young University
- Dominic Besag – Saint Mary's College
- Erich Storti – Saint Mary's College
- Oscar Treacy – Central Washington University
- Josefa Toiaivao – Saint Mary's College
- Tayson Hammer – Brigham Young University
- Quinton Tindal – Cal Poly San Luis Obispo
- Campbell Robb – Central Washington University
- Leon Best – Life University
- Hayden McKay – Mount Saint Mary's University
- EJ Freeman – University of Arizona
- Jake Cornelius – United States Naval Academy
- Rand Santos – University of California – Berkeley
- Ronan Krieger – United States Naval Academy
