= University at Buffalo Rugby Football Club =

University at Buffalo
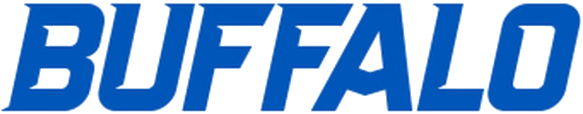
- Full name: University at Buffalo Rugby Football Club
- Union: USA Rugby
- Nickname(s): Bulls
- Founded: 1966; 59 years ago
- Location: Buffalo, NY
- Ground(s): Ellicott Rugby Field
- Coach(es): Owen Lawther
- League(s): Division 1-AA
Team kit

Official website
- ubuffalorugby.com

The University at Buffalo Rugby Football Club (UBRFC) is run through the State University of New York at Buffalo Recreational and Intramural Services. The Sports Club Program at UB is under the management of the Student Association. The club participates in the sport of rugby union.

UB Rugby has competed in the D1aa division of the Liberty Conference. Previously Buffalo competed in the Rugby East Conference of Division 1-A rugby from the fall of 2014 to the fall of 2019. UB Rugby joined the East Conference because they wanted to improve and play the highest competition possible. The East Conference includes some of the best college rugby teams in the country, such as Army, Penn State, and Kutztown. UB is led by Head Coach Owen Lawther.

The University at Buffalo Rugby Football Club competes in Division 1 of the New York State Rugby Conference. In the fall of 2007 the UBRFC started a Division 3 team playing in the Excelsior West Division of the New York State Rugby Conference. UB rugby won four championships of the NYSRC Upstate Division 1 Tournament.

== History ==
The UBRFC was founded in 1966. It was originally called the Queens Rugby Football Club. In 1971 the club gave up its ties to the university and became the Buffalo Old Boys men's club. In 1976, a university team was again organized as the "Mad Turtles" playing within the New York Upstate Rugby Union (URU). Team jersey colors were sky blue with a band of red-white-navy-white-red. The team negotiated a sponsorship in 1980 with Koch's Brewery of Dunkirk, N.Y. and changed their team name to the "UB Black Horses", named after Koch's Black Horse Ale. The uniforms changed at this time to solid black with an embroidered Black Horse Ale patch on the left chest, In 1984 the sponsorship ended when the UB Student Association funded the team and they again became the "Mad Turtles", switching colors to crimson jerseys with crimson and gold hooped sleeves. At this time they were also an official member of the New York State Rugby Conference (NYSRC). In the 1984 season the team claimed a victory in the NYSRC Collegiate Championship, qualifying for USA Rugby's Collegiate National Championship for the first time.

In 2010, the team was ranked No. 1 in the nation by American Rugby News capturing the NYSRC title. UB Rugby had another successful season in 2011, reaching the playoffs, and defeating Southern Connecticut to reach the quarterfinals. In the 2012–13 season, UB Rugby had three players make the All-Empire Conference Team.

In 2014, UB Rugby has a successful beginning to its participation in the D1-A East Conference, notching up a win against Notre Dame College.

== Location ==
The UBRFC Bulls play all of their home games at the "Rugby Pitch" located at the Ellicott Complex on the UB's North Campus.
