= 1982 National Collegiate Rugby Championship =

Tournament details
- Tournament format(s): Knockout
- Date: May 8 – 9, 1982

Tournament statistics
- Teams: 4
- Matches played: 4

Final
- Venue: Greeley, CO
- Champions: California (3rd title)
- Runners-up: Life Chiropractic

The 1982 National Collegiate Rugby Championship was the third edition of the official national championship for intercollegiate rugby organized by the U.S. Rugby Football Union. The tournament took place on Jackson Field at Northern Colorado University in Greeley, Colorado.

== Venue ==
Colorado
Jackson Field	1982 National Collegiate Rugby Championship is located in Colorado
Greeley, Colorado	1982 National Collegiate Rugby Championship is located in Colorado
Capacity:1,860	1982 National Collegiate Rugby Championship is located in Colorado

== Participants ==
Life Chiropractic College
Qualified for the National Championship by winning the Eastern College Championship at Princeton University on April 17–18.

- Life College 15-3 Merchant Marine
- Life College 20-16 Lehigh
- Life College 19-15 Navy
- Life College 21-4 Virginia Tech

Roster:
Manager– Dr. Sid Williams
Coach- Kevin Lentin
Captain– Jim Hovey
Kenny Arnold (Prop), Dave Auten (Lock), Lou Barnum (Lock), Phil Bracco (Wing), Brian Burns (Wing), Carmen Campisi (Prop), Jeff Carson (Wing), Richard Cobb (Hooker), Deforest Dean (Scrumhalf), Mike DeRosa (Center), Steve Elliott (Center), Dave Eugster (Wing Forward), Jeff Fitch (Fullback), Bob Gise (Wing Forward), Dennis Hawk (Wing Forward), Jim Hovey (#8), Kerry Johnson (Lock), Al Latronica (Prop), Buck Mastellone (Wing), Mac Miller (Center), Joe Nilsson (Lock), Joe Shafer (Hooker), Pete Smith (Flyhalf), Jeff Solomon (Wing Forward).

Michigan
Qualified for the National Championship by winning the Midwest Universities Cup at Bowling Green, Ohio on May 1–2.

- Michigan 40-7 Bowling Green

Roster:
President- Tom McLaughlin
Manager– Steven Cohen
Coach– Arnold Cowmeadow
Captain– Dave Weber
Record- 13-3
Ian Chapman (Prop), Kevin Cunningham (Center), Mark Curry (Flanker), Dick Dowe (Wing), Jack Goodman (Fullback), Mark Hoch (Prop), Dog Jensen (Center), Brian Kenny (Wing), Dave Kieras (Lock), Paul Knight (Flyhalf), Pete Maglocci (Center), Jeff McCallister (Fullback), Tom McLoughlin (Center), Tony Menyhart (Flanker), Tom Rabone (Flanker), Jim Randolph (Flanker), Greg Rose (Hooker), Brian Van Deusen (Lock), Dave Weber (Scrumhalf).

New Mexico State Chiles
Qualified for the National Championship by winning the Western Regional on April 24 in Austin, TX.

- New Mexico State 20-3 Colorado
- New Mexico State 28-12 Texas A&M
- New Mexico State 13-10 OT Kansas State

Roster:
Manager– Joel Diemer
Coach- Patrick Lamb
Captain– Eric Smith
Record- 12-3
Chris Adkins (Flanker), Albert Bass (Hooker/Prop), John Beasley (Prop), Ralph Calkins (Scrumhalf), Tim Diemer (Hooker), Jeff Dorwart (Wing/Center), Ken Fearon (Flanker), Wally Gilmore (Scrumhalf), John Gonzalez (Flyhalf), Robert Halper (Lock), Bill Hein (Lock/Prop), Mark Landers (Inside Center), Matt Mattox (Lock), J. Miller (#8), Andy Myers (Flanker), Cary Perkins (Flanker), Mark Schwaner (Wing), Eric Smith (Fullback), Gary Steele (Wing/Center), Mark Teel (Wing), Scott Vendrely (Prop).

California
Qualified from Pacific Regional at UCSB on April 10–11.

- California 27-3 Western Washington
- California 16-6 UCLA

Roster:
Manager– Jack Clark
Coach- Ned Anderson
Captain- Andrew Brooks
Tim Bailey (Lock), Bill Bicker (Center), John Blackburn (Flanker), Andrew Brooks (Hooker), Dave Clark (#8), Jesse Covarrubias (Lock), Marc Covert (Wing), Kevin Fox (Prop), Mike Jackson (Flyhalf), Don James (Prop), Ed Kerwin (Center), Andy Lamond (Scrumhalf), Greg Loberg (Prop), Peter Lukins (Flanker), Doug McKenzie (Hooker), George Roeth (Wing), Hugh Preston (Flyhalf), John Riddering (Lock), Matt Secor (Fullback), Bob Tanaka (Scrumhalf), Matt Taylor (Wing), Keith Zafren (Flanker).

== Bracket ==
Regional Semifinal
April 10 - Santa Barbara, CA
California	27
Western Washington	3
April 10 - Santa Barbara, CA
UCLA	21
BYU	3
May 2 - Bowling Green, OH
Michigan	17
Ohio State	3
May 2 - Bowling Green, OH
Bowling Green	3
Stevens Point	0
April 18 - Princeton, NJ
Life College	19
Navy	15
April 18 - Princeton, NJ
Virginia Tech	12
Princeton	7
April 17 – Las Cruces, NM
New Mexico State	28
Texas A&M	12
April 17 – Lawrence, KS
Kansas State	28
Oklahoma	6

Regional Final
April 11 - Santa Barbara, CA
California	16
UCLA	9
May 2 - Bowling Green, OH
Michigan	44
Bowling Green	12
April 18 - Princeton, NJ
Life College	28
Virginia Tech	4
April 24 – Denver, CO
New Mexico State	14
Kansas State	10

National Semifinal
May 8 – Greeley, CO
California (Pacific)	19
Michigan (Midwest)	8
May 8 – Greeley, CO
Life College (East)	34
New Mexico State (West)	11

National Final
May 9 – Greeley, CO
California	15
Life College	14
Third place
May 9 – Greeley, CO
Michigan	26
New Mexico State	3

== Semifinals ==
8 May 1982

California	19–8	Michigan
Try: Drew Brooks; Bob Tanaka 49' c Con: Hugh Preston (1/2); Pen: Hugh Preston (3)		Try: Dick Dowe; Dave Weber

Greeley, CO
Referee: Erhardt (Texas)

8 May 1982

Life Chiropractic	34–11	New Mexico State
Try: Deforest Dean 17' c Mac Miller c Bob Gise c Con: Peter Smith 3 Pen: Peter Smith 4		Try: Gary Steele (2); Pen: Jeff Dorwart

Greeley, CO
Referee: Dave Head (SoCal)

== Third place ==
9 May 1982

Michigan	26–3	New Mexico State
Try: Ian Chapman; John Collins c Kevin Trim c Dave Shelton; Con: Matt McBryde (2/4); Pen: Matt McBryde (2)		Pen: Jeff Dorwart

Greeley, CO
Referee: Hefflefinger

== Final ==
9 May 1982
2:00PM

California	15–14	Life College
Try: Matt Taylor c Con: Hugh Preston; Pen: Hugh Preston (3/3)		Try: Jim Honey; Mike DeRosa; Con: (0/2); Pen: Pete Smith (2)

Greeley, CO
Attendance: 800
Referee: Erhardt

All–Championship Team
Coach Ned Anderson (California)
1 John Beasley (New Mexico)
2 Drew Brooks (California)
3 Ian Chapman (Michigan)
4 Dave Auten (Life)
5 Jesse Covarrubias (California)
6 Cary Perkins (New Mexico)
7 Bob Gise (Life)
8 Jim Hovey (Life)
9 Bob Tanaka (California)
10 Hugh Preston (California)
11 Matt Taylor (California)
12 Mac Miller (Life)
13 Pete Maglocci (Michigan)
14 John Collins (Michigan)
15 Eric Smith (New Mexico)

== See also ==
1982 National Rugby Championships
