= Tim O'Brien (rugby union) =

US international rugby union player

Tim O'Brien is an American rugby union coach. He is currently the head coach for Saint Mary's College, which plays in Division 1-A.

O'Brien starred while playing college rugby as a student at Cal. O'Brien also played for the United States national rugby union team, earning three caps between 1980 and 1983 playing as a center and wing. O'Brien then coached the Old Blues rugby club and Lamorinda youth rugby.

Under O'Brien's leadership St. Mary's has become one of the leading college rugby teams in the United States. When O'Brien took over as Saint Mary's head coach in 2001, he transformed the program from a recreational, social activity to a competitive varsity-type program. O'Brien's team quickly found success, with Saint Mary's reaching the quarterfinals of the national playoffs in 2002.

In 2007, St. Mary's finished ranked fifth in the country, having beaten then #5 ranked Army in the national playoffs. O'Brien was named coach of the year by American Rugby News for the 2006–07 season. O'Brien led St. Mary's to the national semifinals in 2008.

Under O'Brien, St. Mary's finished second in Division 1-A competition in 2013, and in 2014 won the Division 1-A championship. O'Brien was named 2014 Coach of the Year by This Is American Rugby. O'Brien has been recognized for his accomplishments in terms of recruiting, and developing relationships with alumni and with the school.
