= PAC Rugby Conference =

College rugby competition in the US

- Conference: Pac-12
- Sport: Rugby union
- First season: 2012
- No. of teams: 4
- Country: United States
- Region: Western United States
- Most recent champion: California (2024)
- Most titles: 15s: California (11); 7s: California (9)
- Website: pac-12.com/rugby

The PAC Rugby Conference was a college rugby conference composed of four schools from the Pac-12 Conference that competed against each other in Division 1-A Rugby. It was formed in 2012 with six teams, with conference play beginning in February 2013 to compete in Division 1-AA. In 2016, PAC added USC and Stanford and dropped Oregon State, and moved up to D1-A. Despite only recently moving up from D1-AA affiliation, the PAC has historically been one of the strongest conferences in college rugby, with five of its members consistently ranked in the Top 25 overall. The PAC Rugby Conference began play on February 2, 2013, with Cal beating Arizona State at Witter Field in Berkeley.

== History of rugby at PAC schools ==
Around the turn of the century, American football was frowned upon for its violence, and President Theodore Roosevelt insisted upon reform or abolition of the game. During this period of uncertainty, rugby made a brief but important reappearance in many colleges, most notably at Cal and Stanford. It was these two Universities that supplied most of the players to the two U.S. Olympic rugby teams that won gold medals at the 1920 Olympics and 1924 Olympics. PAC Rugby was shown on television for the first time in 2014, when the PAC 12 Network broadcast Cal vs UCLA. Cal has long been one of the faces of rugby at the collegiate level. In addition, excellence by teams such as UCLA and Arizona, as well as recent growth by USC, have made the conference one of the toughest in the country.

== Members ==
Institution	Team	Location	Founded	Enrollment	Endowment	Nickname	Rugby Since	Head coach
Arizona	Arizona Wildcats	Tucson, AZ	1885	40,223	$563,655,000	Wildcats	1969	Sean Duffy
California	California Golden Bears	Berkeley, CA	1868	36,142	$3.15×10^{9}	Golden Bears	1882	Jack Clark
UCLA	UCLA Bruins	Los Angeles, CA	1919	40,675	$2.98×10^{9}	Bruins	1934	Harry Bennett
Utah	Utah Utes	Salt Lake City, UT	1850	32,388	$670,411,000	Utes	1972	Adam Griffee

== Results ==
Season	Champion	Runner up	Third	Player of the Year	Ref.
2013	California	UCLA			
2014	California				
2015	California	Utah	Arizona State		
2016	California	UCLA	Utah		
2017	California	Utah	Arizona		
2018	California	Arizona	UCLA		
2019	California	Arizona			
2020	California	Arizona	Utah		
2021	Only one match was played with California defeating Arizona 48–7.				
2022	California			Sam Golla (Cal); Lucas Lacamp (UCLA)	
2023	California	Arizona	UCLA		
2024	California	UCLA	Arizona		

== PAC Sevens Rugby Tournament ==
This PAC Sevens Rugby Tournament occurs every fall. The winner of the tournament receives an automatic berth to the USA Rugby Sevens Collegiate National Championships. The tournament debuted in 2011 where Colorado beat Utah in the final match. In 2012, all 12 of the Pac-12 schools participated for the first time and Cal won. In 2016 the tournament was hosted in Tucson, Arizona for the first time, where it was won by Cal for the fifth straight year.

Date	Location	Champion	Final score	Runner up	Third	Tournament MVP	Leading Try Scorer	Ref.
Oct. 21-22, 2011	Stanford	Colorado	14–12	Utah	UCLA	Luke Lahman	--	
Nov. 3-4, 2012	Los Angeles	California	21–12	Utah	UCLA	--	--	
Nov. 2-3, 2013	Los Angeles	California	22–0	UCLA	Oregon State	--	--	
Nov. 8–9, 2014	Berkeley	California	45–5	Arizona State	UCLA	Russell Webb		
Nov. 6–7, 2015	Berkeley	California	17–5	UCLA	Arizona State			
Nov. 12–13, 2016	Tucson	California	47–14	Arizona State	Utah			
Nov. 11–12, 2017	Tucson	Arizona	31–26 (a.e.t.)	California				
Nov. 3–4, 2018	Berkeley	California	33–5	Arizona	Arizona	Zachary Tavenner		
Nov. 9–10, 2019	Stanford	California	24–7	Arizona	UCLA/Utah			
No event held in 2020
Nov. 6–7, 2021	Berkeley	California	10–0	UCLA	Arizona		Lucas Lacamp (8)	
Nov. 12–13, 2022	Stanford	California	31–5	Arizona	Stanford/UCLA	Kealan O'Connell		
No event held in 2023
