= Southeastern Collegiate Rugby Conference =

US college rugby union competition

- Current season, competition or edition: 2024
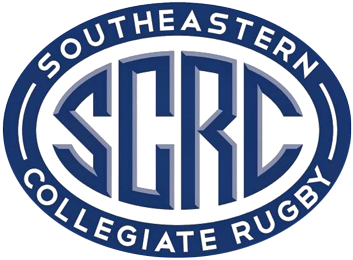
- Conference: Southeastern
- Sport: Rugby union
- Founded: 2010; 16 years ago
- First season: 2012
- Commissioner: Marty Bradley
- No. of teams: 10
- Country: United States
- Most recent champion: Kentucky (3rd title)
- Most titles: Tennessee (5 titles)
- Website: southeasternrugby.org

The Southeastern Collegiate Rugby Conference (SCRC) is an annual college rugby competition played every spring among 10 universities from the Southeastern Conference.

The SCRC was formed in December 2010 by a core group of founding schools — Georgia, Florida, South Carolina and Tennessee. By April 2011 the SCRC had expanded to 12 schools composed of the NCAA's Southeastern Conference (SEC).

The conference is led by SCRC Commissioner Marty Bradley.

== Commercial success ==
The Southeastern Conference has enjoyed commercial success, announcing in October 2010, before conference play had even begun, that the SCRC had formed commercial partnership agreements with Adidas and the World Rugby Shop. World Rugby Shop decided to sponsor the SCRC "because of the vision and potential of the league. Using established conference structures and rivalries is the future of the college rugby game in the U.S. and the SCRC will tap into a rich tradition of Southern rivalries at the major Southeastern Universities."

== Schools ==
The current 10 member schools of the SCRC are in the table below.

Institution	Location	Enrollment	Nickname	Rugby since	Head coach
Eastern Division
University of Georgia	Athens, Georgia	35,520	Bulldogs	1967	Doug Porter
University of Kentucky	Lexington, Kentucky	28,094	Wildcats	1969	Tony Vince
University of South Carolina	Columbia, South Carolina	30,721	Gamecocks	1967	Mark Morris
University of Tennessee	Knoxville, Tennessee	27,523	Volunteers	1970	Marty Bradley
Vanderbilt University	Nashville, Tennessee	12,093	Commodores	1970	James Snell
Western Division
University of Alabama	Tuscaloosa, Alabama	33,602	Crimson Tide	1973	Eddie Buckner
Auburn University	Auburn, Alabama	25,078	Tigers	1973	Dale Hartmann
University of Florida	Gainesville, Florida	51,474	Gators	1967	Ken Simmons
Mississippi State University	Starkville, Mississippi	21,424	Bulldogs	1977	Evan Kaplan
University of Mississippi	Oxford, Mississippi	19,822	Rebels	1974	

The SCRC includes 10 of the 14 SEC schools. The other four schools are Missouri and Arkansas (which play rugby in the Heart of America conference), and Texas A&M and LSU (which play rugby in the Red River Conference). LSU was in the SCRC until 2014, but left before the 2015 season to join the Texas-based teams in the Red River Conference; Florida switched from the Eastern Division to the Western Division to balance the divisions with five teams each.

== Results (regular season) ==
The following tables show the win–loss records of the various SCRC teams during conference play. The numbers in parentheses show that team's national ranking at the end of the season.

2013 regular season
West	Record	East	Record
LSU	5–1	Tennessee (19)	6–0
Ole Miss	4–2	South Carolina	5–1
Alabama	1–3	Kentucky	3–3
Auburn	2–2	Florida	2–3
Mississippi State	0–6	Vanderbilt	2–4
		Georgia	0–5

2014 (Spring)
West	Record	East	Record
LSU	6–0	So. Carolina (23)	6–0
Auburn	3–3	Florida	4–2
Alabama	2–4	Georgia	2–3–1
Ole Miss	2–4	Tennessee	2–3–1
Mississippi State	1–5	Kentucky	2–4
		Vanderbilt	2-4

2014 (Fall)
West	Record	East	Record
Mississippi State	5–1	Tennessee	6–0
Alabama	4–2	South Carolina	5–1
Auburn	3–3	Florida	4–2
Ole Miss	1–5	Kentucky	3–3
LSU	0–6	Vanderbilt	1–5
		Georgia	1–5

2015
West	Record	East	Record
Alabama (24)	6–0	Tennessee (9)	6–0
Florida	3–3	South Carolina (12)	5–1
Auburn	2–4	Georgia	3–3
Mississippi State	1–5	Kentucky	3–3
Ole Miss	1–5	Vanderbilt	0–6

== Results (post season) ==
Season	Location	SCRC Champion	Final score	SCRC Runner Up	East Division Champ	West Division Champ
2011–12	Montgomery, AL	Florida	22 – 14	Tennessee	Tennessee (6–0)	LSU (5–1)
2012–13	Atlanta, GA	Tennessee	46 – 34	South Carolina	Tennessee (6–0)	LSU (5–1)
2013–14	Knoxville, TN	South Carolina	41 – 24	LSU	South Carolina (6–0)	LSU (6–0)
2014–15	Columbia, SC	South Carolina	50 – 22	Alabama	Tennessee (6–0)	Mississippi St. (5–1)
2015–16	Charlotte, NC	Tennessee	23 - 22	South Carolina	Tennessee (6–0)	Alabama (6–0)
2016–17	Marietta, GA	Alabama	12 – 8	Tennessee	??	??
2017–18	Knoxville, TN	Kentucky	26 – 22	Tennessee	??	??
2018–19	Knoxville, TN	Kentucky	36 – 31	Alabama	??	??
2019–20	??	Tennessee	46 – 21	Kennesaw State	??	??
2020–21	Season canceled due to the COVID-19 pandemic					
2021–22	Knoxville, TN	Tennessee	26 – 17	Clemson	??	??
2022–23	??	Tennessee	27 – 22	South Carolina	??	??
2023–24	Hendersonville, TN	Kentucky	32 – 12	Tennessee	Kentucky (7–0)	Tennessee (6–1)

In 2012, Florida beat Tennessee 22-14 at the championship match, held in Montgomery, Alabama, to win the inaugural SCRC title. Florida (#2 East) had beaten LSU (#1 West) 35-17 in one semifinal, while Tennessee (#1 East) had defeated Alabama (#2 West) 31-22 in the other semifinal.

In the 2013 semifinals, Tennessee (#1 East) defeated Ole Miss (#2 West) 36-32, and South Carolina (#2 East) defeated LSU (#1 West) 36-28. The final featured Tennessee defeating South Carolina 46-34.

In the 2014 spring semifinals, South Carolina (#1 East) defeated Auburn (#2 West) 41–5. In the other semifinal, LSU (#1 West) defeated Florida (#2 East) 54–27, marking the first time that a team from the Western Division reached the final. South Carolina defeated LSU in the final 41–24.

In the 2014 fall semifinals, South Carolina (#2 East) defeated Mississippi State (#1 West) 55–7. In the other semifinal, Alabama (#2 West) defeated Tennessee (#1 East) 37–25 in overtime, marking the first time that the top seed from the Eastern Division did not reach the final. South Carolina defeated Alabama in the final 50–22.

In the 2015 semifinals, South Carolina (#2 East) defeated Alabama (#1 West) 34–27, and Tennessee (#1 East) defeated Florida 30–13. Tennessee defeated South Carolina in the final 23–22.

== Awards ==
Season	Player of the Year	Coach of the Year
2012	Matt Neuhart (TENN)	Mark Seitz (ALA)
2013	Tim Holkenborg (SCAR)	Mark Morris (SCAR)
2014 (Spring)	Matt Berenato (SCAR)	Mark Morris (SCAR)
2014 (Fall)	Dana Corcoran (SCAR)	Evan Kaplan (MSST)
2015	Matthew Schick (ALA)	Marty Bradley (TENN)
2016	Ross Depperschmidt (ALA)	Gary Anderson (KEN)
2017	Brendon Esson (KEN)	Gary Anderson (KEN)
2018	??	??
2019	Brendon Esson (KEN)	??
2020	Season canceled due to the COVID-19 pandemic	
2021	Greg Janowick (TENN)	??
2022	Josh Shelter (TENN)	Scott Tungay (TENN)
2023	Jack Phillips (KEN)	Sam Enari (KEN)

== National playoffs ==
Florida qualified for the 2012 Division 1-AA playoffs by virtue of its Southeast Conference championship, but lost to Florida State in the round of 32. Tennessee received an at large bid to the 2012 Division 1-AA playoffs due to the strength of the Southeast Conference; in the national playoffs, Tennessee defeated Maryland 47–13 and Florida State 45–27 to reach the quarterfinals.

Tennessee and South Carolina both reached the 2013 national D1-AA playoffs. Both fell in the Round of 16 — Tennessee fell 17–30 to eventual champions Central Florida, and South Carolina lost 7–29 to in-state rival Clemson.

In the 2014 national D1-AA playoffs, the SCRC was represented by South Carolina, Georgia, and LSU. South Carolina beat Georgia 46–22 in the Round of 16, before falling 28–44 in the quarterfinals to eventual champions Central Florida. LSU lost in the Round of 16 to Central Florida by 19–50.

== Southeastern Collegiate 7s Championship ==
Season	Location	SCRC Champion	Final score	SCRC Runner Up	Semifinalists
2010	Tuscaloosa, AL	Tennessee	19–17	LSU	Florida, ??
2011	Knoxville, TN	Tennessee	26–14	Florida	LSU, Arkansas
2012	Montgomery, AL	Texas A&M	28–10	Georgia	Tennessee, Auburn
2013	Knoxville, TN	Auburn	28–22	Florida	Tennessee, South Carolina
2015	Knoxville, TN	Alabama	24–14	Mississippi State	Tennessee, South Carolina

The Southeastern Collegiate Rugby Sevens Championship was played every fall by universities from the southeastern United States until transitioning to a spring event beginning with the 2014/2015 academic season. Tennessee won the inaugural 2010 Southeastern Collegiate Rugby Sevens Championship and currently has the most titles at two.
