= 1976 National Rugby Championships =

Tournament details
- Tournament format(s): Knockout
- Date: 1976

Tournament statistics

Final

The 1976 National Rugby Championships included the Collegiate tournament and the 18th edition of the Monterey National.

== College ==
The 1976 College championship took place from October 23–24 at LSU's Parade Grounds in Baton Rouge, Louisiana. LSU were the champions. Palmer was runner-up. LSU won three matches in the series to win the title. Georgia took third and Lamar placed fifth. The women's division had six teams with Florida State emerging victorious. The University of Florida took third. Brown University won the Sportsmanship Trophy.

Championship Bracket

Quarter-finals
October 23 - Baton Rouge, LA
LSU	27
WV Wesleyan	0
October 23 - Baton Rouge, LA
Brown	29
Lamar	0
October 23 - Baton Rouge, LA
Palmer	13
Florida	4
October 23 - Baton Rouge, LA
Georgia	11
Texas A&M	7

Semi-finals
October 23 – Baton Rouge, LA
LSU	22
Brown	12
October 23 – Baton Rouge, LA
Palmer	34
Georgia	6

Final
October 24 – Baton Rouge, LA
LSU	21
Palmer	3
Third place
October 24 – Baton Rouge, LA
Georgia	10
Brown	3

Consolation Bracket

Semi-finals
October 23 – Baton Rouge, LA
WV Wesleyan	0
Lamar	36
October 23 – Baton Rouge, LA
Florida	8
Texas A&M	4

Fifth place
October 24 – Baton Rouge, LA
Lamar	8
Florida	7
Seventh place
October 24 – Baton Rouge, LA
Texas A&M	21
WV Wesleyan	6

=== Final ===
24 October 1976
2:20PM

LSU	21–3	Palmer
Try: Joey Husbands 30' c Bob Causey 35'; Clay Mahaffey; Clay Mahaffey 75'; Con: Kamal Abdullah; Drop: Kamal Abdullah		Pen: 55'

Baton Rouge
Attendance: 500
Referee: Peter Jones

Women's Tourney
Group 1

- Florida State 34–0 Memphis Belles
- Florida State 12–4 LSU
- LSU 14–0 Memphis Belles

Group 2

- Florida 12–0 Southeastern Louisiana
- Florida 0–4 Texas A&M
- Texas A&M 12–0 Southeastern Louisiana

5th place

- Memphis 8–0 Southeastern

3rd place

- LSU 0–4 Florida

1st place

- Florida State 10–4 Texas A&M

== Monterey National Championships ==
Program cover for 1976 tournament.

The 1976 Monterey National Rugby Championship was the 18th edition of the tournament and was considered to be the de facto national championship. This event took place at Pebble Beach, CA from March 20–21. The tournament MVP was Tom Klein (BATS), Most Valuable Fan was 87 year old Watson Luke, Brian Cedarwell of the Athletic RFC won the Running Drop Kick contest while Steve Montgomery of Old Blues was runner-up. The Bay Area Touring Side of San Francisco, CA went 5–0 to take first place.

First round

20 March 1976 1	BATS	10-0	Coronado RC	Pebble Beach
8:00AM				Stadium: Field 1

20 March 1976 2	Dartmouth RFC	10-0	Stanford University	Pebble Beach
8:00AM				Stadium: Field 2

20 March 1976 3	Newport Beach	3-6	St. Mary's College	Pebble Beach
8:00AM				Stadium: Field 3

20 March 1976 4	UC Berkeley	16-0	Hawaii Harlequins	Pebble Beach
8:00AM				Stadium: Field 4

20 March 1976 5	Athletic RFC	14-0	Hastings RFC	Pebble Beach
8:30AM				Stadium: Field 1

20 March 1976 6	X–O RC	4-3	Kern County RC	Pebble Beach
8:30AM				Stadium: Field 2

20 March 1976 7	Olde Gaels	9-0	Buffalo's RC	Pebble Beach
8:30AM				Stadium: Field 3

20 March 1976 8	UCLA	10-3	Santa Clara University	Pebble Beach
8:30AM				Stadium: Field 4

20 March 1976 9	Old Blues RC	3-4	Portland RC	Pebble Beach
9:00AM				Stadium: Field 1

20 March 1976 10	OMBAC	6-0	Palo Alto RFC	Pebble Beach
9:00AM				Stadium: Field 2

20 March 1976 11	Los Angeles RC	0-0 (L–W p)	Seahawks	Pebble Beach
9:00AM				Stadium: Field 3

20 March 1976 12	Old Puget Sound Beach	16-6	Monterey RC	Pebble Beach
9:00AM				Stadium: Field 4

20 March 1976 13	San Jose State	3-0	USC	Pebble Beach
9:30AM				Stadium: Field 1

20 March 1976 14	CSU Long Beach	3-3 (W–L p)	San Francisco RC	Pebble Beach
9:30AM				Stadium: Field 2

20 March 1976 15	Capitol RFC	4-0	Boulder RC	Pebble Beach
9:30AM				Stadium: Field 3

20 March 1976 16	Santa Monica RC	9-0	Chico RC	Pebble Beach
9:30AM				Stadium: Field 4

Championship Bracket

Second Round; March 20
1	BATS	9
16	Dartmouth	4
24	Saint Mary's	0
8	Cal Berkeley	6
5	Athletic RFC	7
12	X–O Rugby Club	6
13	Olde Gaels	6
4	UCLA	21
30	Portland Pigs	6
14	OMBAC	3
23	Seahawks	4
7	Old Puget Sound Beach	6
6	San Jose State	8
11	Long Beach	0
15	Capitol RFC	0
2	Santa Monica	7

Quarterfinals; March 20
1	BATS	20
8	Cal Berkeley	4
5	Athletic RFC	0
4	UCLA	4
30	Portland Pigs	3
7	Old Puget Sound	9
6	San Jose State	3
2	Santa Monica	8

Semifinals; March 20
1	BATS	9
4	UCLA	3
7	Old Puget Sound	0
2	Santa Monica	19

Final; March 21
1	BATS	13
2	Santa Monica	3
Third place
4	UCLA	16
7	Old Puget Sound	13

=== Final ===
21 March 1976
2:20PM

BATS	13–3	Santa Monica
Try: Eric Haley 23'; Pen: Kip Oxman 15'; Kip Oxman; Drop: Kip Oxman		Drop: John McDermott

Pebble Beach

Champions: Bay Area Touring Side
Coach: James Waste
Captain: Brick Haley
Roster: Mike Anderson, Fred Brown, Dick Dumont, Roger De Salles, Pete Eireman, Ty Gerlach, Don Guest, Orv Hibbard, Bobby Jonson, Tom Klein, Steve Luber, Ian Loveseth, Jerry Mosher, Skip Nubauer, Tom Ogrady, Kip Oxman, Tom Pullman, Mike Purcell, Doug Single, Mike Stepanian, Howie Williams, Mike Wood, Mike Yancy.

5th–8th
L33	Cal Berkeley	3
L34	Athletic RFC	3*
L35	Portland Pigs	3
L36	San Jose State	15

Fifth place
W51	Athletic RFC	3
W52	San Jose State	6
Seventh place
L51	Cal Berkeley	17
L52	Portland Pigs	7

*Advanced on kicks

Thirteenth
Field 2 9:40AM
W55	St. Mary's	0
W56	Capitol	25
Fifteenth
Field 4 12:00PM
L55	X-O RC	24
L56	Seahawks	12

13th–16th
Field 2 4:00PM
L37	St. Mary's	17
L38	X-O RC	0
Field 4 4:40PM
L39	Seahawks	3
L40	Capitol	6

9th–16th
Field 2 1:10PM
L17	Dartmouth	9
L18	St. Mary's	7
Field 2 1:50PM
L19	X-O Rugby Club	0
L20	Olde Gaels	3
Field 3 2:30PM
L21	OMBAC	6*
L22	Seahawks	6
Field 4 2:00PM
L23	Long Beach	12
L24	Capitol RFC	9

9th–12th
Field 2 4:40PM
W37	Dartmouth	0
W38	Olde Gaels	3
Field 3 5:10PM
W39	OMBAC	4
W40	Long Beach	3

Ninth
Field 2 10:50AM
W53	Olde Gaels	3
W54	OMBAC	14
Eleventh
Field 3 12:00PM
L53	Dartmouth	6
L54	Long Beach	13

*Advanced on kicks

Consolation Bracket

Second Round; March 20
L1	Coronado	0
L2	Stanford	10
L3	Newport Beach	9
L4	Hawaii Harlequins	13
L5	Hastings	0
L6	Kern County	25
L7	Buffalo's RC	6
L8	Santa Clara	3
L9	Old Blues	17
L10	Palo Alto	0
L11	Los Angeles RC	4
L12	Monterey RC	0
L13	USC	4
L14	San Francisco RC	0
L15	Boulder	3
L16	Chico RC	17

Quarterfinals; March 20
W25	Stanford	11
W26	Hawaii Harlequins	0
W27	Kern County	21
W28	Buffalo's	3
W29	Old Blues	0
W30	Los Angeles RC	0*
W31	USC	4
W32	Chico RC	7

Semifinals; March 20
W41	Stanford	10
W42	Kern County	6
W43	Los Angeles RC	0
W44	Chico RC	0*

17th place March 21
W57	Stanford	19
W58	Chico RC	7
19th place
L57	Kern County	11
L58	Los Angeles RC	6

*Advanced on kicks

21st–24th
L41	Hawaii Harlequins	3*
L42	Buffalo's RC	3
L43	USC	4
L44	Old Blues	4*

21st place
W59	Hawaii Harlequins	6
W60	Old Blues	12
23rd place
L59	Buffalo's RC	41
L60	USC	10

*Advanced on kicks

29th place
Field 3 8:30AM
W63	Newport Beach	9
W64	Palo Alto	3
31st place
Field 4 8:30AM
L63	Hastings	10
L64	Boulder	16

29th–32nd
Field 4 4:00PM
L45	Newport Beach	13
L46	Hastings	4
Field 4 6:00PM
L47	Palo Alto	4
L48	Boulder	0

25th–32nd
Field 4 12:40AM
L25	Coronado	10
L26	Newport Beach	4
Field 4 1:20PM
L27	Hastings	0
L28	Santa Clara	8
Field 3 3:10PM
L29	Palo Alto	0
L30	Monterey	7
Field 4 2:40PM
L31	San Francisco RC	6
L32	Boulder	3

25th–28th
Field 4 3:20PM
W45	Coronado	16
W46	Santa Clara	8
Field 4 5:20PM
W47	Monterey	4
W48	San Francisco RC	0

25th place
Field 1 8:30AM
W61	Coronado	19
W62	Monterey	4
27th place
Field 2 8:30AM
L61	Santa Clara	0
L62	San Francisco RC	7

Exhibition match:

- UCLA Women's 14-6 San Francisco Women's RC
