= 1975 National Rugby Championships =

US rugby union competition

Tournament details
- Tournament format(s): Knockout
- Date: 1975

Tournament statistics

Final

The 1975 National Rugby Championships were limited to Local Union championships since the United States of America Rugby Football Union had only been established on June 7 of that year in Chicago. The Territorial selection tournament would not start until 1977 therefore most of the higher level play was by the sub-unions. There was no college tournament during the reorganization of the RFU and the Monterey National played its 17th edition.

== Local Union Selects ==
The Eastern Rockies v Texas match was the final of the Western RFU Championship Tournament, the idea of which was brought up during the June 1975 meeting in Chicago that established the United States RFU. Third place went to Rio Grande RFU, Missouri RFU was fourth, Heart of America RFU fifth and Beehive Intermountain RFU sixth.

15 April 1975

NorCal Pelicans	21–3	Abertillery (Wales)

Polo Fields, San Francisco

19 April 1975
2:00PM

NorCal Pelicans	26–9	SoCal Griffins

UC Irvine

7 April 1975

Ebbw Vale	10–12	Golden State Poppies

Ebbw Vale, Wales

9 April 1975

Swansea	21–7	Golden Poppies

St. Helen's Stadium

14 April 1975

Edinburgh	4–25	Poppies

Scotland

16 April 1975

Scottish Border Counties	19–16	NorCal Poppies

Scotland

19 April 1975

Esher	9–9	Poppies

England

21 April 1975

Bath XV	16–10	Poppies

Bath, England

24 April 1975

Cheltenham	0–18	Poppies

England

25 May 1975

Ontario RU	14–0	Midwest RFU

Toronto, ON

1 June 1975

Wisconsin RFU	0–7	Chicago Area RFU

Madison, WI

1 June 1975

Tri–State RU	–	Blackhawk RU

Indianapolis, IN

14 September 1975

Eastern Rockies RFU	4–11	Texas RFU

Colorado Springs, CO

9 November 1975

Blackhawk RU	–	Chicago Area RU

Davenport, IA

== Monterey National Championships ==
Program cover for 1975 tournament.

The 1975 Monterey National Rugby Championship was the 17th edition of the tournament and was considered to be the de facto national championship. This event took place at Pebble Beach, CA from March 22–23. The tournament MVP was Mike Hodgins (Cal Berkeley), Most Valuable Fan was 86 year old Watson Luke, Steve Montgomery of the Old Blues won the Drop Kick competition while Mickey Ording of X–Os was runner-up. UCLA went 5–0 to take first place.

First round

22 March 1975 1	Santa Monica RC	19-0	Western Washington State College	Pebble Beach
8:00AM				Stadium: Field 1

22 March 1975 2	Sacramento Capitol	0-0 (L–W p)	Pensacola Navy	Pebble Beach
8:00AM				Stadium: Field 2

22 March 1975 3	Old Blues	6-6 (W–L p)	St. Mary's College	Pebble Beach
8:00AM				Stadium: Field 3

22 March 1975 4	Old Puget Sound Beach	3-0	Santa Clara University	Pebble Beach
8:00AM				Stadium: Field 4

22 March 1975 5	X–O RC	6-0	USC	Pebble Beach
8:30AM				Stadium: Field 1

22 March 1975 6	Florida State	6-0	Portland RC	Pebble Beach
8:30AM				Stadium: Field 2

22 March 1975 7	Newport Beach	10-4	Oregon State	Pebble Beach
8:30AM				Stadium: Field 3

22 March 1975 8	UC Berkeley	14-0	The Fresno Rugby Club	Pebble Beach
8:30AM				Stadium: Field 4

22 March 1975 9	UCLA	20-0	UC Davis	Pebble Beach
9:00AM				Stadium: Field 1

22 March 1975 10	Chuckanut Bay	0-9	Seahawks RC	Pebble Beach
9:00AM				Stadium: Field 2

22 March 1975 11	OMBAC	8-0	San Francisco RC	Pebble Beach
9:00AM				Stadium: Field 3

22 March 1975 12	San Jose State	15-0	Navy All–Star Touring Side	Pebble Beach
9:00AM				Stadium: Field 4

22 March 1975 13	CSU Los Angeles	10-3	River Rat RC	Pebble Beach
9:30AM				Stadium: Field 1

22 March 1975 14	Stanford University	0-9	Monterey RC	Pebble Beach
9:30AM				Stadium: Field 2

22 March 1975 15	UC Santa Barbara	0-0 (W–L p)	Olde Gaels	Pebble Beach
9:30AM				Stadium: Field 3

22 March 1975 16	BATS	12-0	Washington State	Pebble Beach
9:30AM				Stadium: Field 4

Championship Bracket

Second Round; March 22
1	Santa Monica	30
17	Pensacola Navy	0
9	Old Blues	4
8	Old Puget Sound Beach	0
5	X–O Rugby Club	6
12	Florida State	0
13	Newport Beach	7
4	Cal Berkeley	10
3	UCLA	18
19	Seahawks	3
11	OMBAC	0
6	San Jose State	3
7	CSU Long Beach	12
22	Monterey RC	3
15	UC Santa Barbara	0
2	BATS	28

Quarterfinals; March 22
1	Santa Monica	20
9	Old Blues	0
5	X–O	6
4	Cal Berkeley	10
3	UCLA	9
6	San Jose State	0
7	Long Beach	0
2	BATS	19

Semifinals; March 22
1	Santa Monica	3
4	Cal Berkeley	0
3	UCLA	12
2	BATS	6

Final; March 23
1	Santa Monica	7
3	UCLA	10
Third place
4	Cal Berkeley	8
2	BATS	6

=== Third place ===
23 March 1975
12:45PM

Cal Berkeley	8–6	BATS
Try: Mike Hodgins (2)		Pen: Kip Oxman (2)

Pebble Beach
Attendance: 5000

=== Final ===
23 March 1975
2:20PM

Santa Monica	7–10	UCLA
Try: Greg Schneeweis; Pen: John McDermott		Try: Vince Pasavariello 5' c Terry Scott; Con: John Sullivan

Pebble Beach
Attendance: 5000

Champions: University of California at Los Angeles Bruins
Coach: Dennis Storer
Captains: Terry Scott, Wade Killefer
Roster: Steve Auerbach, David Briley, Del Chipman, Tom Clark, Jeff Ferrar, John Fowler, Jamie Grant, Dennis Jablonski, Art Keuhn, Larry Layne, Randy Lovelace, Jesse Naufahu, Rudi Nieto, John Pasquariello, Vince Pasquariello, Ed Purcell, Jeff Smith, David Sugden, John Sullivan, Greg Viviano.

5th–8th
L33	Old Blues	0
L34	X–O	3
L35	San Jose State	12
L36	Long Beach	0

Fifth place
W51	X–O	6
W52	San Jose State	13
Seventh place
L51	Old Blues	8
L52	Long Beach	7

Thirteenth
Field 2 10:15AM
W55	Florida State	6
W56	OMBAC	18
Fifteenth
Field 3 12:45PM
L55	Pensacola	4
L56	Monterey	16

13th–16th
Field 2 4:00PM
L37	Pensacola	3
L38	Florida State	3*
Field 4 4:40PM
L39	OMBAC	17
L40	Monterey	9

9th–16th
Field 2 1:10PM
L17	Pensacola	0
L18	Old Puget Sound	24
Field 2 1:50PM
L19	Florida State	0
L20	Newport Beach	10
Field 3 2:30PM
L21	Seahawks	0*
L22	OMBAC	0
Field 4 2:00PM
L23	Monterey	3
L24	Santa Barbara	4

9th–12th
Field 2 4:40PM
W37	Old Puget Sound	6
W38	Newport Beach	0
Field 3 5:10PM
W39	Seahawks	12
W40	Santa Barbara	0

Ninth
Field 2 12:45PM
W53	Old Puget Sound	10
W54	Seahawks	9
Eleventh
Field 2 11:30AM
L53	Newport Beach	0
L54	Santa Barbara	8

*Advanced on kicks

Consolation Bracket

Second Round; March 22
L1	Western Washington	0
L2	Sacramento Capitol RC	15
L3	St. Mary's College	6
L4	Santa Clara University	4
L5	USC	7
L6	Portland RC	6
L7	Oregon State	10
L8	Fresno RC	13
L9	UC Davis	0
L10	Chuckanut Bay	8
L11	San Francisco RC	14
L12	Navy All Star Touring Side	0
L13	River Rat RC	4*
L14	Stanford	4
L15	Olde Gaels	6
L16	Washington State	3

Quarterfinals; March 22
W25	Sacramento Capitol	12
W26	St. Mary's	3
W27	USC	8
W28	Fresno	0
W29	Chuckanut Bay	15
W30	San Francisco RC	0
W31	River Rat	0
W32	Olde Gaels	4

Semifinals; March 22
W41	Sacramento	6
W42	USC	0
W43	Chuckanut Bay	16
W44	Olde Gaels	0

17th place March 23
W57	Sacramento	14
W58	Chuckanut Bay	6
19th place
L57	USC	28
L58	Olde Gaels	6

*Advanced on kicks

21st–24th
L41	St. Mary's	4
L42	Fresno RC	3
L43	San Francisco RC	0
L44	River Rat	12

21st place
W59	St. Mary's	7
W60	River Rat	6
23rd place
L59	Fresno RC	8
L60	San Francisco RC	16

29th place
Field 3 9:00AM
W63	Portland RC	6
W64	Washington State	0
31st place
Field 4 9:00AM
L63	Western Washington	17
L64	Navy All Star	11

29th–32nd
Field 4 4:00PM
L45	Western Washington	0
L46	Portland RC	17
Field 4 6:00PM
L47	Navy All Star	0
L48	Washington State	9

25th–32nd
Field 4 12:40AM
L25	Western Washington	0
L26	Santa Clara	4
Field 4 1:20PM
L27	Portland RC	3
L28	Oregon State	10
Field 3 3:10PM
L29	UC Davis	3
L30	Navy All Star Touring	0
Field 4 2:40PM
L31	Stanford	22
L32	Washington State	0

25th–28th
Field 4 3:20PM
W45	Santa Clara	11
W46	Oregon State	7
Field 4 5:20PM
W47	UC Davis	0
W48	Stanford	4

25th place
Field 1 9:00AM
W61	Santa Clara	8
W62	Stanford	4
27th place
Field 2 9:00AM
L61	Oregon State	19
L62	UC Davis	8
