= Red River Conference =

American college rugby conference

- Formerly: Allied Rugby Conference
- Conference: Big 12; SEC; AAC
- Sport: Rugby union
- Founded: 2014; 12 years ago
- No. of teams: 7
- Country: USA
- Region: Southeastern, West South

The Red River Rugby Collegiate Conference is a college rugby conference in Division 1-A Rugby, formed during summer 2014. The conferences consists of many of the same schools from the Big 12 Conference that had previously been in the Allied Rugby Conference adding the Texas Christian University rugby team.

The "Allied Rugby Conference" (ARC) was an annual rugby union competition played among universities in the South Central United States. ARC featured a spring 15s competition and a fall 7s competition. The ARC folded in the summer of 2014.

== Member schools ==
Institution	Location	Founded	Enrollment	Nickname	Varsity Sports	NCAA D1 Conf.	Rugby Since	Head Coach
Baylor	Waco, TX	1845	15,195	Bears	16	Big 12		Mason Hering
Texas	Austin, TX	1883	51,525	Longhorns	18	SEC	1985	Van Stewart
Oklahoma	Norman, OK	1890	29,721	Sooners	19	SEC	1974	Doug Neubauer
North Texas	Denton, TX	1890	39,454	Mean Green	16	AAC		Andrew Marshall
Texas A&M	College Station, TX	1876	53,337	Aggies	18	SEC	1968	James Lowrey
Texas Tech	Lubbock, TX	1923	32,611	Red Raiders	16	Big 12		Phil Terrigno

Notes:

- Texas left the ARC during the summer of 2013 to play its regular season in the SouthWest Athletic Conference and its post season in the Varsity Cup. Texas is now a full member of the Red River Conference.
- Sam Houston State was a member of the ARC but is not a member of the Red River Conference.
- LSU left the Red River Conference.

Former member schools
Institution	Location	Founded	Enrollment	Nickname	Varsity Sports	NCAA D1 Conf.	Rugby Since	Head Coach
LSU	Baton Rouge, LA	1860	31,527	Tigers	21	SEC		Bob "Big Red" Causey

== Founding and early success ==
The formation of the Allied Rugby Conference was announced in May 2012. The Allied Rugby Conference was formed with three schools from the D1-AA Southwest Conference (Texas, Baylor, Sam Houston State), two schools from the D1-A Mid-South Conference (Oklahoma, Texas A&M), and one school from D2 (Texas Tech).

The formation of this new conference was part of the trend in college rugby of regrouping into traditional conferences to take advantage of existing brands and rivalries. Another goal behind forming the ARC was to assist clubs to reach their maximum potential and raise the standard of rugby throughout the region. The conference also formed to establish a core group of name-recognizable institutions to market for sponsorship & recruitment on the collective college campuses.

Before the Conference had even begun play, they had already secured sponsorship from the World Rugby Shop, and the Allied conference also secured a sponsorship with Gilbert. The ARC was formed to get the teams significant exposure from a marketing and brand perspective. Games are podcast and in some instances live web cast. The ARC webcasts a conference "game of the week" each Monday during the spring 2012 competition.

== Leadership ==
TeShay Flowers is the Conference Commissioner.

== Competitions ==
The ARC announced a desire to pursue a bowl game type of event, which would involve playing matches against teams from neighboring conferences.

=== Regular season ===
2013 Table
Results	Team
5–0	Texas A&M
4–1	Texas
3–2	Oklahoma
2–3	Texas Tech
1–4	Sam Houston State
0–5	Baylor

Notes:

- Gold shading indicates qualified for the ARC championship.

=== Playoffs ===
ARC Championship
Date	Location	Champion	Final score	Runner-up
April 6, 2013	College Station, TX	Texas A&M	45–5	Texas

=== Sevens ===
The Allied Rugby Conference 7s is played every fall, and includes all conference teams plus select non-conference invited opponents. The winner lands an automatic place in the USA Rugby Sevens Collegiate National Championships. The ARC also announced it aims to gain an automatic qualifier to the Collegiate Rugby Championship 7s event played every June in Philadelphia.

Date	Location	Champion	Final score	Runner-up	Tournament MVP
October 6, 2012	Norman, OK	Texas A&M	12–7	Colorado State	--
