= Michigan RFC =

- Full name: Michigan Rugby Football Club
- Founded: 1959
- League: USA Rugby Division III
Team kit

Michigan RFC is an American rugby team based in Ann Arbor, Michigan. The team plays in the Midwest Conference of the USA Rugby Division III.

== History ==
The club was founded in 1959 at the University of Michigan and was originally composed of both university students and faculty as well as players with no affiliation to the university.

In January 2000 the club and university teams formally split up into separate clubs as a result of USA Rugby regulations.

== Honors ==
- USA Rugby Division II
  - 1995
