= Big Ten Universities =

Division 1-A college rugby conference

- Sport: Rugby Union
- Founded: 2012
- First season: 2012
- Commissioner: Tom Rooney
- No. of teams: 15s: 8; 7s: 9
- Country: United States
- Most recent champions: 15s: Notre Dame (2025); 7s: Indiana (2026)
- Most titles: 15s: Indiana (7); 7s: Wisconsin (5)
- Website: www.bigtenrugby.com

Big Ten Universities is a Division 1-A college rugby conference founded in summer 2012 by ten of the twelve schools that then made up the Big Ten Conference (which has since expanded to 18 members). The Big Ten Universities was formed to improve rugby among the Big Ten schools by capitalizing on traditional Big Ten rivalries, increasing the number of fans, attracting talented high school rugby players, and playing other regional schools, which would create more competitive matchups with traditional rivals.

Prior to 2012, most of these schools had played in the now defunct Division 1-AA Midwest conference (Iowa, Minnesota, Nebraska, Wisconsin) and the Division 1-AA Mid-Eastern conference (Indiana, Michigan State, Purdue). Ohio State had played in Division 1-A in the East conference.

Organization of college rugby has been evolving since 2009, with many schools organizing into conferences similar to the traditional NCAA conferences. In November 2010, USA Rugby's college management committee set out a plan for transitioning universities to NCAA-style conferences. The purpose of the realignment is for college rugby to capitalize on the marketability of major college conference rivalries.

== Members ==
Institution	Location	Enrollment	Nickname	Colors	Rugby since	Head coach
University of Illinois	Urbana-Champaign, Illinois	41,918	Fighting Illini	Orange & Navy	1963	Kevin Battle
Indiana University	Bloomington, Indiana	42,464	Hoosiers	Cream & Crimson	1962	Eddie Abel
University of Michigan	Ann Arbor, Michigan	37,197	Wolverines	Maize & Blue	1959 (1890)	Christian Mentzer
Michigan State University	East Lansing, Michigan	43,159	Spartans	Green & White	1964	Tim Britain
University of Notre Dame	South Bend, Indiana	12,809	Fighting Irish	Blue & Gold	1961	Justin Hickey
Ohio State University	Columbus, Ohio	66,444 (2017)	Buckeyes	Scarlet & Gray	1966	Ron Bowers
Purdue University	West Lafayette, Indiana	39,637	Boilermakers	Old Gold & Black	1970	Casey Doten
University of Wisconsin	Madison, Wisconsin	42,595	Badgers	Cardinal & White	1962	Kurtis Shepherd

Notes:

- Four Big Ten members do not play rugby in Big Ten Universities:
  - Conference charter members University of Iowa, University of Minnesota, and University of Nebraska compete in the D1AA Heart of America Conference.
    - The University Of Minnesota left the Big 10 in 2021
    - The University of Iowa left the Big 10 in 2019
    - The University of Nebraska left the Big 10 in 2015
  - Conference charter member Northwestern compete in NCR D2.
  - Penn State, a Big Ten member since 1990, plays in the Rugby East conference of Division 1-A. Having competed in the 2011 Big Ten 7s, in 2022 Penn State rejoined the conference as a 7s member.
  - The two schools that joined the Big Ten in 2014, Maryland and Rutgers, respectively play in the NCR Chesapeake Rugby Conference and the Liberty Rugby Conference.
  - Notre Dame joined as a full member for the 2022 season after taking part in the Spring 2022 Big Ten 7s Championship.

== Results ==
Season	Champion	Score	Runner up	East Champ	West Champ	Player of the Year	Top Try Scorer	Top Points Scorer	Ref.
Spring 2013	**Wisconsin**	30–10	Ohio State	Ohio State	Wisconsin		Martin Gianetti (Illinois) 12	Lewis Shaw (Indiana) 83	
Fall 2013	**Indiana***	58–38	Michigan	Indiana	Michigan	Isaac Hall (Indiana)	Isaac Hall (Indiana) 7	J. Heginbottom (Wisconsin) 64	
2014	**Wisconsin**	34–20	Ohio State	Ohio State	Wisconsin				
2015	**Indiana**	34–14	Ohio State	Indiana	Wisconsin				
2016	**Indiana**	72–19	Ohio State	Indiana	Wisconsin				
2017	**Indiana**	38–26	Ohio State						
2018	**Wisconsin**	20–13	Indiana						
2019	**Indiana**	34–7	Ohio State			Ben Richards (Ohio State); Case Fleck (Indiana)	Vince Carso (Ohio State); Russell Lemaster (Indiana); 12	Connor Forrestal (Ohio State) 89	
2020	No competition held due to Covid-19								
2021	**Ohio State**	33–29	Indiana	Ohio State	Indiana	Vince Carso (Ohio State)			
2022	**Indiana**	22–20	Ohio State	Ohio State	Indiana	Peyton Wall (Indiana)			
2023	**Indiana**	55–21	Michigan State	Michigan State	Indiana	Peyton Wall (Indiana)			
2024	**Ohio State**	21–17	Notre Dame	Ohio State	Indiana	Maximus Clark (Ohio State)			
2025	**Notre Dame**	12–0	Indiana	Notre Dame	Indiana	Jack Waterhouse (Notre Dame)			

=== Regular season ===
**Fall 2012**

Team	Record
**Wisconsin** (W)	5 — 0
**Illinois**	4 — 1
**Ohio State** (E)	3–1–1
**Indiana**	3 — 2
Michigan	3 — 2
Michigan State	2–2–1
Iowa	2 — 3
Minnesota	2 — 3
Nebraska	0 — 5
Purdue	0 — 5

Notes:

- Bold means qualified for playoffs
- (E) and (W) identify division champions
- Indiana's Fall 2014 Team penalized for eligibility misconduct

**Fall 2013**

Team	Record
**Indiana** (E)	6 — 0
**Michigan** (W)	5 — 1
Wisconsin	5 — 1
Ohio State	3 — 3
Minnesota	3 — 3
Illinois	3 — 3
Michigan State	2 — 4
Iowa	0 — 6
Purdue	0 — 6

**2014**

Team	Record
Indiana	6 — 0
**Wisconsin** (W)	5 — 1
**Ohio State** (E)	4 — 2
**Michigan**	4 — 2
**Iowa**	4 — 2
Minnesota	3 — 3
Michigan State	2 — 4
Illinois	1 — 5
Purdue	1 — 5
Nebraska	0 — 6

**2021**

Team	Record
**Indiana** (W)	6 — 0
**Ohio State** (E)	5 — 1
**Michigan State**	4 — 2
**Illinois**	3 — 3
Michigan	2 — 4
Purdue	1 — 5
Wisconsin	0 — 6

**2022**

Team	Record
**Indiana** (W)	5 — 0
**Ohio State** (E)	4 — 1
**Notre Dame**	4 — 1
**Illinois**	3 — 2
Wisconsin	3 — 2
Michigan State	2 — 3
Michigan	1 — 4
Purdue	0 — 5

**2023**

Team	Record
**Indiana** (W)	4 — 0
**Ohio State** (E)	3 — 1
Michigan State	2 — 0
Michigan	1 — 4
Illinois	1 — 1
Wisconsin	1 — 1
Purdue	1 — 2
Notre Dame	0 — 3

**2024**

Team	Record
**Notre Dame** (E)	3 — 0
**Indiana** (W)	3 — 0
Ohio State	2 — 1
Wisconsin	2 — 1
Illinois	1 — 2
Michigan State	1 — 1
Michigan	0 — 3
Purdue	0 — 3

**2025**

Team	Record
**Indiana** (W)	3 — 0
**Notre Dame** (E)	3 — 0
Michigan	2 — 1
Wisconsin	2 — 1
Ohio State	1 — 2
Illinois	1 — 2
Purdue	0 — 3
Michigan State	0 — 3

== Big Ten 7s ==
The Big Ten schools have formed the Big Ten 7s tournament. The Big Ten tournament features a round of pool play, followed by knockout play. The winner of the Big Ten 7s earns an automatic berth to the USA Rugby Sevens Collegiate National Championships and to the Collegiate Rugby Championship.

The inaugural Big Ten tournament was held August 2011, and hosted by Wisconsin. Wisconsin and Penn State dominated, each winning its respective pool and advancing in knockout play to the finals, where Wisconsin defeated Penn State 21–14. Wisconsin's victory at the 2011 Big Ten 7s earned it the right to compete for the national championship at the 2011 USA Rugby Sevens Collegiate National Championships.

Year	Location	Champion	Final score	Runner up	Third	Tournament MVP	Leading Try Scorer	Ref.
Aug 27, 2011	Madison, WI	Wisconsin	21–14	Penn State	Iowa	Ben Knight (Wisconsin)	—	
Nov 10, 2012	Columbus, OH	Wisconsin	33–14	Penn State	Ohio State	Tom Hemmings (Wisconsin)	Blaze Feury (Penn St); John Ryberg (Iowa); 7	
Apr 14, 2013		Wisconsin	—			Tom Hemmings (Wisconsin)		
Apr 19, 2014	Columbus, IN	Ohio State	29–12	Iowa		Taylor Young (Iowa)		
Apr 18, 2015	Ann Arbor, MI	Indiana		Illinois		Bryce Campbell (Indiana)		
Apr 2–16, 2016	Columbus, OH	Wisconsin	—N/a	Michigan				
2017	Columbus, OH	Ohio State		Wisconsin	Michigan			
Apr 28, 2018	Madison, WI	Wisconsin	26–5	Ohio State				
2019		Ohio State	31–17	Minnesota				
Apr 2–16, 2022	Champaign, IL; West Lafayette, IN; Ann Arbor, MI	Indiana	—N/a		Notre Dame	Will Chevalier (Indiana)		
Apr 15, 2023	South Bend, IN	Penn State	19–14	Indiana	Notre Dame	Ian Roudybush (Penn State)		
Apr 13–14, 2024	South Bend, IN	Penn State	40–0	Michigan	Indiana			
Apr 12–13, 2025	South Bend, IN	Notre Dame	21–12	Oregon				
Apr 11–12, 2026	Indianapolis, IN	Indiana	19–12	Iowa	Michigan			

== See also ==
- College rugby
- Division 1-A Rugby
- Big Ten Conference
