= 2011 Collegiate Rugby Championship =

Championship in Southern United States, Chester, Pennsylvania

Tournament details
- Tournament format(s): Round-robin and Knockout
- Date: June 4–5, 2011

Tournament statistics
- Teams: 16
- Attendance: 17,894
- Top point scorer(s): Peter Tiberio (Arizona) (54 points)
- Top try scorer(s): Peter Tiberio (Arizona) (8 tries)

Final
- Venue: PPL Park, Philadelphia
- Champions: Dartmouth (1st title)
- Runners-up: Army

The 2011 Collegiate Rugby Championship was a rugby union sevens tournament. The competition was held from 4–5 June at PPL Park in Chester, Pennsylvania. The men's tournament featured sixteen teams, whereas the women's tournament featured eight teams.

In the men's championship, Dartmouth defeated Army 32-10. In the women's championship, Army defeated Penn State 14-5.

== Men's tournament ==
=== Overview ===
The tournament consisted of four round-robin pools of four teams. All sixteen teams progressed to the knockout stage. The top two teams from each group progressed to the quarter-finals in the championship competition. The bottom two teams from each group progressed to the quarter-finals in the challenger competition. Over 10,000 fans turned out to watch Day 1 of the tournament.

=== Pool stage ===
Key to colors in group tables
| Teams that advanced to the Championship Bracket |
| Teams that advanced to the Challenge Bracket |

==== Pool A ====
| Team | Pld | W | D | L | PF | PA | +/- | Pts |
|---|---|---|---|---|---|---|---|---|
| California | 3 | 3 | 0 | 0 | 88 | 7 | +81 | 9 |
| Penn State | 3 | 2 | 0 | 1 | 33 | 48 | -15 | 7 |
| Louisiana State | 3 | 1 | 0 | 2 | 22 | 45 | −23 | 5 |
| Ohio State | 3 | 0 | 0 | 3 | 17 | 60 | −43 | 3 |

| Date | Team 1 | Score | Team 2 |
| 2011-06-04 | Louisiana State | 12 – 14 | Penn State |
| 2011-06-04 | California | 38 – 0 | Ohio State |
| 2011-06-04 | Ohio State | 10 – 12 | Penn State |
| 2011-06-04 | California | 24 – 0 | Louisiana State |
| 2011-06-04 | California | 26 – 7 | Penn State |
| 2011-06-04 | Louisiana State | 10 – 7 | Ohio State |

==== Pool B ====
| Team | Pld | W | D | L | PF | PA | +/- | Pts |
|---|---|---|---|---|---|---|---|---|
| Dartmouth | 3 | 3 | 0 | 0 | 77 | 31 | +46 | 9 |
| Utah | 3 | 2 | 0 | 1 | 50 | 39 | +11 | 7 |
| Notre Dame | 3 | 1 | 0 | 2 | 67 | 45 | +22 | 5 |
| Boston College | 3 | 0 | 0 | 3 | 5 | 84 | −79 | 3 |

| Date | Team 1 | Score | Team 2 |
| 2011-06-04 | Boston College | 0 – 31 | Notre Dame |
| 2011-06-04 | Dartmouth | 17 – 12 | Utah |
| 2011-06-04 | Dartmouth | 24 – 19 | Notre Dame |
| 2011-06-04 | Boston College | 5 – 17 | Utah |
| 2011-06-04 | Notre Dame | 17 – 21 | Utah |
| 2011-06-04 | Boston College | 0 – 36 | Dartmouth |

Group B teams had the best knockout record of the four pools, going 6-4 on day two.

==== Pool C ====
| Team | Pld | W | D | L | PF | PA | +/- | Pts |
|---|---|---|---|---|---|---|---|---|
| Army | 3 | 3 | 0 | 0 | 60 | 32 | +28 | 9 |
| Central Washington | 3 | 2 | 0 | 1 | 47 | 31 | +16 | 7 |
| North Carolina | 3 | 1 | 0 | 2 | 53 | 55 | -2 | 5 |
| Navy | 3 | 0 | 0 | 3 | 29 | 71 | −42 | 3 |

| Date | Team 1 | Score | Team 2 |
| 2011-06-04 | Navy | 7 – 38 | North Carolina |
| 2011-06-04 | Army | 14 – 12 | Central Washington |
| 2011-06-04 | Central Washington | 14 – 7 | Navy |
| 2011-06-04 | Army | 28 – 5 | North Carolina |
| 2011-06-04 | Army | 19 – 15 | Navy |
| 2011-06-04 | Central Washington | 21 – 10 | North Carolina |

Group C was the only pool where all four teams registered at least one win in knockout competition on day two.

==== Pool D ====
| Team | Pld | W | D | L | PF | PA | +/- | Pts |
|---|---|---|---|---|---|---|---|---|
| Arizona | 3 | 3 | 0 | 0 | 85 | 0 | +85 | 9 |
| Texas | 3 | 2 | 0 | 1 | 43 | 31 | +12 | 7 |
| Oklahoma | 3 | 1 | 0 | 2 | 34 | 67 | -33 | 5 |
| Temple | 3 | 0 | 0 | 3 | 5 | 69 | −64 | 3 |

| Date | Team 1 | Score | Team 2 |
| 2011-06-04 | Arizona | 28 – 0 | Temple |
| 2011-06-04 | Oklahoma | 12 – 24 | Texas |
| 2011-06-04 | Temple | 0 – 19 | Texas |
| 2011-06-04 | Arizona | 38 – 0 | Oklahoma |
| 2011-06-04 | Arizona | 19 – 0 | Texas |
| 2011-06-04 | Oklahoma | 22 – 5 | Temple |

Group D teams went 0-4 in the knockout phase on day two.

=== Knockout stage ===
==== Championship ====
Quarter-finals
5 June – PPL Park
California | 5
Utah | 21
5 June – PPL Park
Army | 19
Texas | 7
5 June – PPL Park
Dartmouth | 12
Penn State | 7
5 June – PPL Park
Arizona | 0
Central Washington | 5

Semi-finals
5 June – PPL Park
Utah | 7
Army | 12
5 June – PPL Park
Dartmouth | 24
Central Washington | 12

Final
5 June – PPL Park
Army | 10
Dartmouth | 32
Bronze
5 June – PPL Park
Utah | 12
Central Washington | 10

==== Challenger ====
Quarter-finals
5 June – PPL Park
Louisiana State | 12
Boston College | 0
5 June – PPL Park
North Carolina | 19
Temple | 10
5 June – PPL Park
Notre Dame | 28
Ohio State | 7
5 June – PPL Park
Oklahoma | 0
Navy | 19

Semi-finals
5 June – PPL Park
Louisiana State | 24
North Carolina | 7
5 June – PPL Park
Notre Dame | 12
Navy | 10

Final
5 June – PPL Park
Louisiana State | 24
Notre Dame | 0

=== Overall results ===
The following are the overall win/loss results and points differentials for the 8 quarterfinalists:

1. Dartmouth 6-0, +85
2. Army 5-1, +23
3. Utah 4-2, +24
4. Central Washington 3-3, +7
5. Arizona 3-1, +80
6. Cal 3-1, +65
7. Texas 2-2, 0
8. Penn State 2-2, -20

== Women's tournament ==
=== Format ===
The tournament consisted of two round-robin pools of four teams. All eight teams progressed to the knockout stage. The knockout stage is single elimination with no bronze medal match.

=== Pool stage ===
==== Pool A ====
| Team | Pld | W | D | L | PF | PA | +/- | Pts |
|---|---|---|---|---|---|---|---|---|
| Penn State | 3 | 2 | 0 | 1 | 70 | 19 | +51 | 7 |
| Virginia | 3 | 2 | 0 | 1 | 51 | 31 | +20 | 7 |
| Brown | 3 | 1 | 0 | 2 | 17 | 34 | −17 | 5 |
| Temple | 3 | 1 | 0 | 2 | 7 | 61 | −54 | 5 |

| Date | Team 1 | Score | Team 2 |
| June 3 | Brown | 5 – 17 | Virginia |
| June 3 | Penn State | 34 – 0 | Temple |
| June 3 | Penn State | 26 – 7 | Virginia |
| June 3 | Brown | 0 – 7 | Temple |
| June 3 | Temple | 0 – 27 | Virginia |
| June 3 | Brown | 12 – 10 | Penn State |

==== Pool B ====
| Team | Pld | W | D | L | PF | PA | +/- | Pts |
|---|---|---|---|---|---|---|---|---|
| Army | 3 | 3 | 0 | 0 | 62 | 20 | +42 | 9 |
| Princeton | 3 | 1 | 0 | 2 | 43 | 49 | -6 | 5 |
| Navy | 3 | 1 | 0 | 2 | 37 | 43 | -6 | 5 |
| North Carolina | 3 | 1 | 0 | 2 | 29 | 59 | −30 | 5 |

| Date | Team 1 | Score | Team 2 |
| June 3 | Army | 25 – 5 | Princeton |
| June 3 | Navy | 22 – 5 | North Carolina |
| June 3 | Navy | 5 – 21 | Princeton |
| June 3 | Army | 20 – 5 | North Carolina |
| June 3 | North Carolina | 19 – 17 | Princeton |
| June 3 | Army | 17 – 10 | Navy |

=== Knockout stage ===
Quarter-finals
5 June – PPL Park
Penn State | 12
North Carolina | 0
5 June – PPL Park
Temple | 14
Princeton | 10
5 June – PPL Park
Virginia | 12
Navy | 10
5 June – PPL Park
Brown | 0
Army | 27

Semi-finals
5 June – PPL Park
Penn State | 26
Temple | 7
5 June – PPL Park
Virginia | 0
Army | 19

Final
5 June – PPL Park
Penn State | 5
Army | 14

== Players ==
After the conclusion of the tournament, Rugby Mag selected the following 14 players on the All-Tournament team:

1. Blaine Scully - California
2. Peter Tiberio - Arizona
3. Nate Ebner - Ohio State
4. Tim Stanfill - Central Washington University
5. Will Holder - Army
6. Ben Leatigaga - Army
7. Dave Geib - Army
8. Nate Brakeley - Dartmouth
9. Chris Downer - Dartmouth (co-MVP)
10. Nick Downer - Dartmouth (co-MVP)
11. Tanner Scott - Dartmouth
12. Seamus Siefring - Navy
13. Don Pati - Utah
14. Tonata Lauti - Utah

These players were chosen based on the impact they had made during the tournament and also based on their potential to succeed at higher levels of rugby. Of this group of players, Peter Tiberio and Blaine Scully have already played for the USA Sevens national team. Al Caravelli, head coach of the USA Sevens national team, attended the tournament, and confirmed in TV interviews during the tournament that he was scouting several of these 14 players for the national team.
