= Northeastern rugby =

Northeastern rugby may refer to:

- Northeastern University Rugby Club, the rugby team of Northeastern University
- Northeast Rugby Union, the Territorial Area Union (TAU) for rugby union teams playing in the Northeastern United States
