= Middlebury Panthers =

Intercollegiate sports teams of Middlebury College

- University: Middlebury College
- Nickname: Panthers
- Association: NCAA Division III
- Conference: NESCAC (primary); EISA (skiing)
- Athletic director: Erin Quinn
- Location: Middlebury, Vermont
- Varsity teams: 31
- Football stadium: Alumni Stadium
- Basketball arena: Pepin Gymnasium
- Colors: Blue and white
- Website: athletics.middlebury.edu
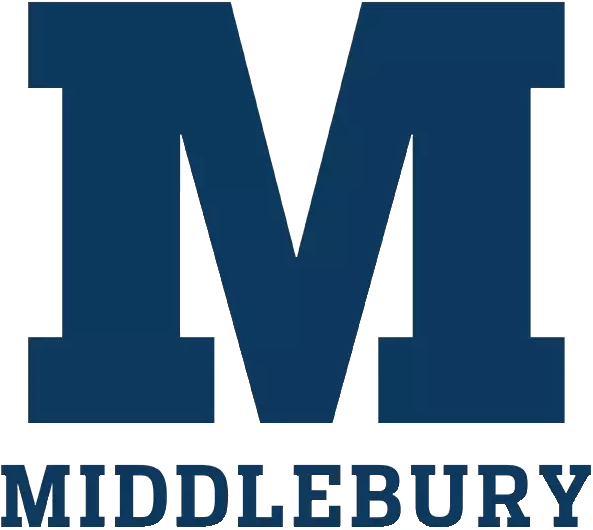

The Middlebury Panthers are the 31 varsity teams of Middlebury College that compete in the New England Small College Athletic Conference. The Panthers lead the NESCAC in total number of national championships, having won 42 team titles since the conference lifted its ban on NCAA play in 1993. Middlebury enjoys national success in soccer, cross country running, field hockey, men's basketball, women's hockey, skiing, men's lacrosse and women's lacrosse, and fields 31 varsity NCAA teams and several competitive club teams including a sailing team (MCSC), a crew team, a water polo team, an ultimate frisbee team, and a rugby team. Since 2000, Middlebury's varsity squads have won 84 NESCAC titles. Currently, 28% of students participate in varsity sports.

In the early 20th century, the Panthers' traditional athletic rivals included the University of Vermont and Norwich University. Today, rivalries vary by sport but typically include Williams College, Hamilton College and Amherst College.

== Varsity sports ==
Men's sports	Women's sports
Alpine skiing	Alpine skiing
Baseball	Basketball
Basketball	Cross country
Cross country	Field hockey
Football	Golf
Golf	Ice hockey
Ice hockey	Lacrosse
Lacrosse	Nordic skiing
Nordic skiing	Soccer
Soccer	Softball
Squash	Squash
Swimming	Swimming
Tennis	Tennis
Track and field	Track and field
	Volleyball

== Facilities ==
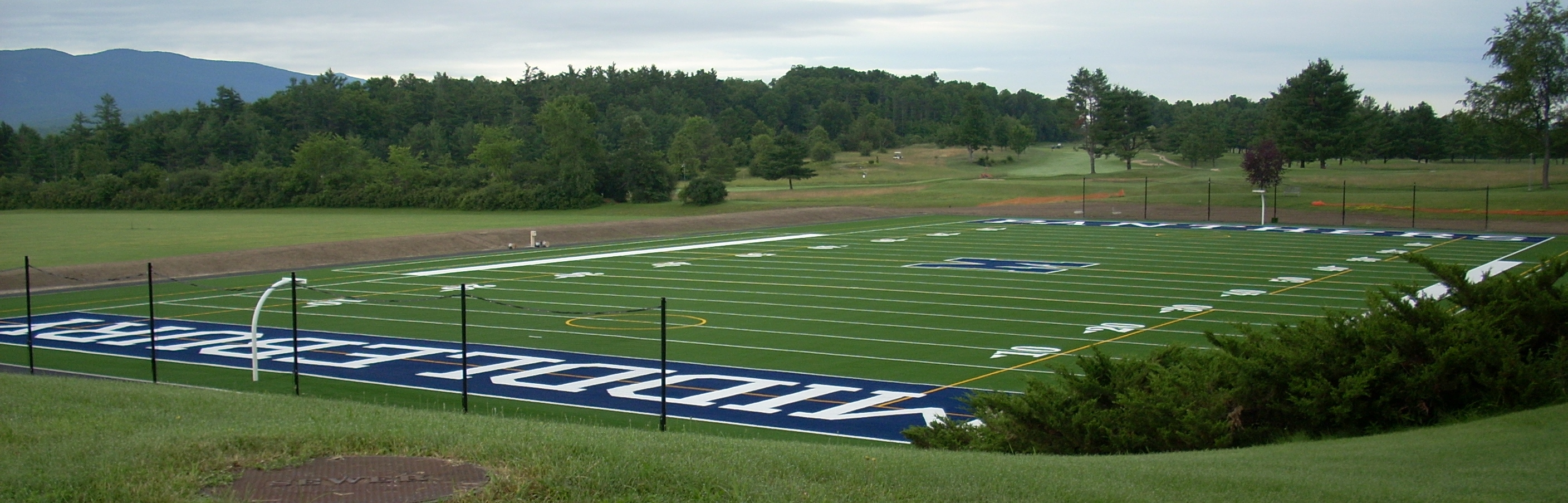
Youngman Field at Alumni Stadium, with the Ralph Myhre 18-hole golf course in the background

The 2011 Princeton Review ranks Middlebury's athletic facilities as #18 best in the United States.

Middlebury's athletic facilities include:

- Middlebury's newest athletic facility, Virtue Field House, opened in January 2015. The 110,000-square-foot structure houses the New Balance Foundation Track, a 200-meter track with nine 60-meter sprint lanes. Dedicated jumping and vaulting areas beyond the oval for field events are also part of the facility, as is McCormick Field, a 21,000-square-foot Field Turf surface inside the track for varsity, club, intramural and recreational purposes as well as throwing events.
- 50-meter by 25-yard (23 m) Olympic-size swimming pool
- 3,500-seat Youngman Field at Alumni Stadium for football and lacrosse
- 2,100 spectator hockey arena
- 1,000 spectator natatorium
- Regulation rugby pitch
- Middlebury College Snow Bowl, the college-owned ski mountain
- 18-hole Ralph Myhre golf course
- Rikert Nordic Center at the Bread Loaf Mountain campus
- Fitness Center
- Allan Dragone Track and Field Complex
- Pepin gymnasium, home of the men's and women's basketball and volleyball teams
- Field Turf men's soccer field
- Indoor and outdoor tennis courts, paddle tennis courts, squash courts
- Rock climbing wall
- 12 FJ-class sailboats, docks, and a practice facility in Panton, Vermont
- Turf Baseball and Softball fields

== Notable achievements ==
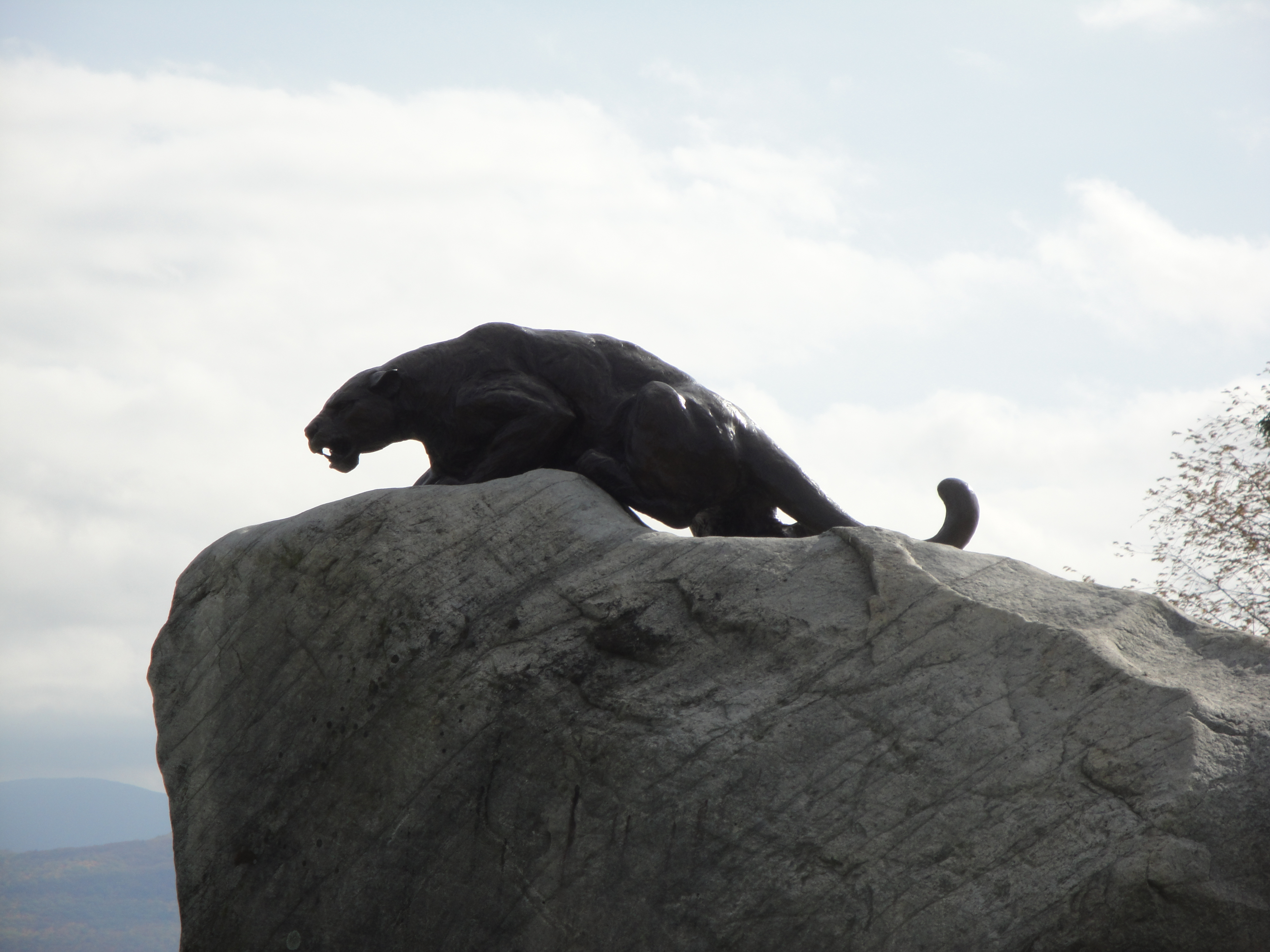
A statue of the Middlebury Panther mascot outside the Alumni Stadium

Middlebury's success in intercollegiate sports is evidenced by the college's second-place ranking in the 2001, 2005, 2007, 2009 and 2011 National Association of Collegiate Directors of Athletics (NACDA) Directors' Cup. The college won the honor for the 2011–12 season.

- Middlebury boasts nearly 40 athletes who have competed in the Olympic Games.
- In 1979 and 1980 the women's ski team won two AIAW national championships.
- The 2000 Men's Football team earned a share of the NESCAC Championship with a 7-1 season, which was also the final one for Middlebury Athletics Hall of Fame Coach Mickey Heinecken, who finished his 28-year career with 126 wins.
- In 2003, Middlebury Water Polo won the Men's Division III Collegiate Club Championship.
- From 2004 to 2006, both the men's and women's ice hockey teams won three consecutive NCAA Division III National Championships, an unprecedented feat for a college at any level. The men have won eight cumulative titles, while the women own six.
- In 2007, Middlebury's Men's Soccer team captured its first NCAA Championship in the 54-year history of the program.
- In 2007 and 2009, the Middlebury College Rugby Club won Division II USA Rugby Championships.
- In 2010, two Middlebury Alumni, Garrott Kuzzy '06 and Simi Hamilton '09, represented the United States in Nordic Skiing at the 2010 Winter Olympics in Vancouver.
- In 2011, the Middlebury men's basketball team reached the 2011 NCAA Men's Division III Tournament for the first time in school history.
- In 2013, the Middlebury women's soccer team reached the NCAA Division III Final Four for the first time in school history and appeared in the NCAA Championship match in 2018.
- In 2019, Middlebury Water Polo won the Women's Division III Collegiate Club Championship.
- In 2019, the Middlebury football team won the NESCAC Championship with a perfect 9–0 record, the first in NESCAC history.
- From 2015 to 2022, the Women's Field Hockey team won six national championships and has won five-straight NCAA titles from 2017 to 2022.
- During the 2021–22 academic year, the Panthers won NCAA Championships in field hockey (22–0), women's ice hockey (27–0–0) and women's lacrosse (22–1).
- From 2018 - 2026 (2020 cancelled), competing in the D-III division, the Men's Club Ultimate Frisbee team appeared in 7 of 8 semifinals, 5 of 8 finals, and won the championship in 2019 and 2026. With 3 (2013 additionally), the club holds the most titles in the division.
- From 2021 - 2026, competing in the D-III division, the Women's Club Ultimate Frisbee team appeared in every national semifinal, 4 of 6 finals, and won the championship in 2021, 2022, 2023, and 2026. With 4, the club holds the most titles in the division.

=== National Championships ===
- Men's Ice Hockey – 8 (1995, 1996, 1997, 1998, 1999, 2004, 2005, 2006)
- Women's Lacrosse – 12 (1997, 1999, 2001, 2002, 2004, 2016, 2019, 2022, 2023, 2024, 2025, 2026)
- Women's Field Hockey – 9 (1998, 2015, 2017, 2018, 2019, 2021, 2022, 2023, 2024)
- Women's Cross Country – 6 (2000, 2001, 2003, 2006, 2008, 2010)
- Women's Ice Hockey – 6 (2000, 2001, 2004, 2005, 2006, 2022)
- Women's Club Ultimate Frisbee - 4 (2021, 2022, 2023, 2026)
- Men's Lacrosse – 3 (2000, 2001, 2002)
- Men's Tennis – 3 (2004, 2010, 2018)
- Men's Club Ultimate Frisbee - 3 (2013, 2019, 2026)
- Men's Club Rugby – 2 (2007, 2009)
- Men's Soccer (2007)
- Men's Club Water Polo (2003)
- Women's Club Water Polo (2019)
- Women's Club Rowing (2026)

== See also ==
- List of Middlebury College alumni
- Middlebury College Rugby Club
