= NURFC =

NURFC may refer to:

- National Underground Railroad Freedom Center
- Northeastern University Rugby Football Club
