= Fairfield Yankees RFC =

US rugby union club, based in Westport, CT

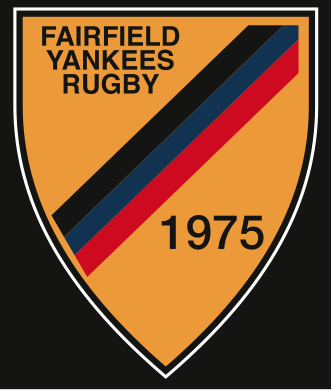
- Full name: Fairfield Yankees Rugby Football Club
- Union: Empire Geographical Union
- Founded: 1975; 51 years ago
- Ground(s): Staples High School Football Field; Westport, Connecticut
Team kit

Official website
- www.fairfieldyankeesrugby.org

The Fairfield Yankees Rugby Football Club is a Division II and IV Men's and Division II Women's Rugby Club based in Fairfield, Connecticut. Founded in 1975, the club consists of many teams, two Men's sides and one Women's side, as well as teams for Summer Sevens and Youth and High School Teams with the Fairfield Rugby Club. The Yankees have fielded teams in the Metropolitan New York Rugby Union as well as the New England Rugby Football Union (NERFU), and currently are members of the Empire Geographical Union (Empire GU). The Yankees won the USA Rugby Division II Men's Club National Championship in 2004, and the Division III Men's Club National Championship in 2016.

== History ==
=== Origins ===
The Fairfield Yankees RFC (initially named the Connecticut Yankees RFC), began their first season back in September 1975, when a number of players answered a newspaper advertisement. The advertisement read "Wanted: Rugby Players and Beer Drinkers", and was placed by club founder, Frank Sinnott (President 1976). That Fall the club had one scrimmage against Yale University and lost 28–4. The Yankees officially joined the MetNY Union in the Spring of 1978 as an independent club with one side. The youthful and inexperienced Yankees posted a 10–2 record that Spring and a 6-5-1 record in the Fall. Due to life's impediments (age, careers, family responsibilities, etc.) this one group of dedicated ruggers dwindled & in the Fall of 1988, the Yankees merged with their cross Fairfield County rivals, the Stamford Wombats. The red stripe within the club shield represents the jersey color associated with the former Wombats RFC. In the fall season of 1992, the Yankees A and B sides combined for a 22–2 record, won the Mid-Atlantic Regional Tournament, and qualified as one of the final four teams in the East Coast finals. In 1994, under the guidance of Coach Stephen Cain, the Yankees completed the season in first place in Division II of the Met Union.

=== The Dark Years ===
Between 1995 and 1999 the Yankees did not post a single winning season and despite establishing a clubhouse, numbers waned, interest fell and the club was in danger of folding. Sensing the danger, many old boys, including Tommy Kubic, Beave Kubic, Duncan Forsyth, Kevin Black, Kenny Seakas, Mark Holzner, Scott Pressler and others answered the call. These old boys, and others, recruited many new faces to fill the ranks of the 1st XV.

=== Rebirth ===
In that rebuilding year of 1999, the Yankees lost the first game to Monmouth by 10 points and many members had to play two matches because the team failed to travel with sufficient numbers. The second game of that season against Montauk, a longtime rival, saw only 17 players travel and the game started with just 14 players against Montauk's full side. The Yanks managed to win by 5 points. From that moment, the Yanks understood that they could accomplish anything and indeed they did, winning all of the remaining matches that season. With that turnaround, the finish in 1999 was sufficient for a bid to the USARFU Men's Div. II Sweet Sixteen in Fort Worth, TX. They fell to national powerhouse Fort Worth RFC in the first round at their home pitch.

In 2000, capitalizing on three years of practice, teamwork, and sacrifice brought the Yankees to win Division II of the Met NY Union, undefeated in league play. The Yanks completely dominated Division II, beating longtime rivals Monmouth RFC, Montauk RFC and Long Island RFC. Returning to USARFU Men's Div. II Sweet Sixteen playoffs in Spring 2001, the Yanks received a berth in the playoffs which were held locally by New Haven "Old Black" RFC in New Haven, CT. After defeating Buffalo RFC in the first round, the 2001 championship series saw the Yanks enter the Elite Eight for the first time in club history. The Yanks progressed no further, falling again to Fort Worth RFC. In 2001, the Yankees posted a 7–1 record in league play. Another tough regional playoffs turned the Yanks to face Springfield (MO) RFC in the first round of the playoffs. The Yanks fell to Springfield (MO) RFC in the Round of 16. However, this was the 3rd consecutive appearance in the "Sweet Sixteen".

=== Move to NERFU ===
In 2002, the Yankees changed their affiliation from the Met Union to the New England Rugby Union. Instead of travelling to New York, New Jersey and Long Island, the Yanks schedule moved to include Massachusetts, Maine, Rhode Island and Vermont. In the first season with NERFU, the Yanks posted a 6-1-1 record. The Yanks earned the top seed in the National Playoffs, qualifying for the 4th consecutive year, but failed to advance beyond the round of 16.

=== 2004 Men's D2 National Champions ===
In 2004, the Yankees entered the tournament as the 14th seed and defeated Metropolis, Norfolk, Indianapolis and finally Nashville RFC to win the D2 National Championship in Pittsburgh, PA.

=== 2004-2015 ===
From 2005 to 2008, the Yankees competed in the NERFU D1 Men's league. In 2009, the team returned to METNY D1 Men's league in an effort to head-off waning numbers. Under the direction of Richard "Patches" Leonard, the seemingly young and inexperienced, active player base put on a highly competitive performance. However, in the midst of METNY RFU restructuring, the Yankees moved down to division II to continue to rebuild their active member base and to improve their ability while gaining additional match experience.

Throughout changes taking place within USA Rugby and the structure of the Unions across the nation, the Yankees decided to move to division III during their switch over to the Empire GU.

=== 40th Anniversary & Establishment of the Fairfield Yankees ===
In 2015, the Yankees marked their 40th anniversary and merged with the Fairfield Rugby Club, becoming the Fairfield Yankees and adopting a blue stripe on their shield. Following the merger, the club became part of the Fairfield Rugby Club and introduced youth teams. In the 2015 season, the team fielded a 15-a-side squad for its inaugural fall season.

=== 2016 Men's D3 National Champions ===
Under the leadership of Head Coach David Lyme, and Coaches Richard "Patches" Leonard and Grant "Randy" Heller, the Yankees blazed to a 9–1 record in the Fall of 2015, winning the Empire GU NY conference, with 587 points for, and 101 points against. Fairfield fended off Brooklyn, North Jersey, and Rockaway to take home the Empire GU Title; the Yankees then faced MIT, in the NERFU-EGU crossover game, to advance to the quarterfinals, despite losing long-time scrum half & play-maker, Austin Ryan, to a season-ending injury early in the game. Hosted in Pittsburgh, the Yanks put away Rocky Gorge in the quarterfinals, and then the Bremer County Bucks in the semifinals, to go on to the National Championship game. At Infinity Park in Denver, Fairfield met a much bigger, undefeated, Euless Texans side. Thanks to a dominant scrum, structured defense, and brilliant runs by the backs (capped off with perfect 7 for 7 kicking by Karl "Rambo" Rempe), the Yankees came away with a hard-fought 41–33 victory; Captain Myles McQuone hoisted the Cup, and Captain Matthew Leonard hoisted the MVP trophy.

=== 2017-18 Women's and Second Men's Teams ===
In 2017, the team formed a second Men's side and established the Fairfield Lady Yankees (FLY), with their first official seasons having started in 2017, officially joining the Empire GU in 2017. In 2018, the Women's team were moved up to D2 in the Empire GU, prepared to face a stronger level of competition.

== Notable players ==
- Kevin Nealon, actor and comedian, played rugby with the club for several years.
- Myles McQuone, Professional player for the Major League Rugby team New Orleans Gold during their 2018 Professional Season. Myles played for both the New England Free Jacks during their 2019 Pre-Professional Season and for Rugby United New York beginning in their 2019 Professional Season.
- Karl Rempe, Player for the Major League Rugby team New England Free Jacks beginning in their 2019 Exhibition Season
- Ben Brzoski, Strength and Conditioning Coach for Professional Team Rugby United New York beginning in 2019
