= Bowdoin Rugby Football Club =

(United States) Bowdoin College RFC
- Full name: Bowdoin Rugby Football Club
- Union: National Collegiate Rugby
- Nickname: Polar Bears
- Founded: 1969
- Location: Brunswick, Maine
- Ground: Pickard Rugby Field
- President: Will McDonough
- Coach: Gareth Roberts
- Captain(s): Thomas Weller and Owen Chambers
- League: New England Rugby Football Union
1st kit	2nd kit

Official website
- athletics.bowdoin.edu/sports/mens-rugby

Bowdoin Rugby Football Club is the men's rugby club of Bowdoin College, founded in 1969 with a combination of students from Bowdoin and men from Portland, Maine. The BRFC shares its origins with the Portland Rugby Club, making it one of the oldest rugby teams in the state of Maine. It is one of the largest non-varsity sports teams at Bowdoin.

== History ==
In 1969, an undergrad named John Philipsborn was kicked off the lacrosse team and with the encouragement of the Bowdoin College President Roger Howell, cobbled together a small group of students and men from Portland, Maine, to learn about a sport that at the time was very foreign to most people at Bowdoin. This group informally existed for a couple years—the first match was against Brown (lost)—but they did beat Dartmouth during the first season. After a few seasons, the Portland players split off to form the Portland Rugby Club.

By the mid 1970s, rugby at Bowdoin had fizzled out when a student named Tom Gimbel ('76) started it anew. Gimbel recruited a group of players that formed the organization that exists today, including Geoff Rusack, Peter Bernard and Jes Staley, former Barclays CEO.

During the mid-seventies era, and the club's knowledge of rugby was sustained by visiting professors and exchange students. Traditions were developed and passed down from class to class by upper classmen.

In the early 1980s, a visiting professor math professor named Rob Curtis helped the team for a few seasons under the leadership of Chris Messerly and Neil Moses.

Women's rugby began in the early 1980s—encouragement and coaching provided by Bowdoin rugger David Weir.

In the mid-1980s, a local Maine resident named Brad Osborn informally helped coach the club. In 1985, a (well deserved) suspension rocked the team and Andy Palmer ‘88 and other players recruited Rick Scala to start coaching and providing supervision per the request of then Bowdoin Athletic Director Sid Watson—Scala's first season was the fall of 1986.

In 1991, the mighty Bowdoin team defeated Middlebury College to win the NESCAC championship.

Bowdoin Ruggers have been selected to represent the New England Rugby Union, the Northeast Rugby Union as well as the All-American Rugby Team. The team is known for its strengths on the field as well as off.

The Bowdoin Men's Rugby Club won the John Hayes Award in 2007. The John Hayes Award is given annually to one team in the New England Rugby Football Union for sportsmanship.

In 2022, the Bowdoin Men's Rugby Club led the nation in NCR Scholastic All-Americans, with 14 players receiving the honor.
