= Christopher Frazier =

American professional rugby union player

Chris Frazier
- Full name: Christopher Frazier
- Born: March 7, 1991 (age 35) Nanjemoy, Maryland
- Height: 190.5 cm (6 ft 3.0 in)
- Weight: 102 kg (225 lb)
- School: Henry E. Lackey High School
- University: Northeastern University

Rugby union career
- Position(s): number eight, wing
- Current team: New England Free Jacks
Amateur team(s)
Years	Team	Apps	(Points)
2014-2018	Mystic River Rugby Club	50	(100)
Senior career
Years	Team	Apps	(Points)
2018	Boston Mystics	3	
2018-	New England Free Jacks	2	
National sevens team
Years	Team		Comps
2017-	USA Falcons		3

Chris Frazier (born March 7, 1991) is an American professional rugby union player currently with the New England Free Jacks. He plays both fifteens and sevens and has represented the United States with the USA Falcons 7s side. He is a former Collegiate All-American and previously played club level rugby for Mystic River.

== Collegiate and club rugby career ==
Frazier is from Nanjemoy, Maryland and attended Henry E. Lackey High School in nearby Indian Head where he was a linebacker on the football team, earning a scholarship to attend Northeastern University and play outside linebacker for their football team in 2009. Northeastern folded the program shortly after his freshman season. The following year, Frazier tried out for the Northeastern rugby team (also known as the Maddogs) and despite never playing the sport, quickly gained a spot on the Division 1 playoff roster. Frazier exceeded in the sport rapidly on both NU's fifteens and seven a side teams, eventually becoming team captain, winning ECRC All-Conference honors in 2013 and 2014 and invitations to the Northeast Olympic Development Academy in 2013, and the USA Eagles 7s High Performance Camp in 2014. In 2014, Frazier was named to the USA Rugby All-American 7s team that would participate in the Serevi RugbyTown 7s, becoming the first Northeastern player to claim that honor.

After graduation, Frazier went on to play club level rugby with D1 Mystic River Rugby Club, helping the Mystics to national titles in 2016 and 2018. Frazier continued to be a regular among high performance and invitational 7s sides, being named to the NYC 7s side which would compete in the 2015 World Club 7s in Limerick, Ireland and the Halloween 7s in St. Petersburg, Florida. He was also a member of the Mystic squads who took bronze medals at the USA Rugby Club 7s National Championships in 2015 and 2018, and was named to the Men's Club 7s "Dream Team" in 2016 and again in 2018. In 2018, he was a runner up for the Men's Club Player Of The Year, losing out to Belmont Shore and Tongan international Viliame Iongi.

== USA Falcons ==
In October 2017, Frazier was named to the USA Falcons squad which would compete at the Dubai Sevens. In 2018, Frazier once again returned to the Serevi RugbyTown 7s, this time as a member of the Falcons squad. Coincidentally, it was the Falcon's first appearance at RugbyTown 7s since 2014, the same year he competed at the tournament as a Collegiate All-American. That same year he was selected for the USA Falcons South American tour and the Las Vegas Invitational, but was forced to withdraw due to an injury. In October 2018, Frazier would travel again with the Falcons and compete at the AF International Sevens Tournament in Manchester, England.

== Major League Rugby ==
In the spring of 2018, Frazier played with the Boston Mystics, an exhibition team who played against the Ontario (now Toronto Arrows) and Rugby United New York in a Major League Rugby pre season competition, making two appearances for the club.

Frazier later signed with the New England Free Jacks in October of that year, picking up the starting number eight position in their debut match against Toronto. In December, he again suited up for the Free Jacks, lining up on the wing against RUNY.
