= Old Gold Rugby =

US rugby union club, based in Boston, MA

(United States) Old Gold
- Full name: Old Gold Rugby Football Club
- Union: USA Rugby
- Nickname: Old Gold
- Founded: 1974; 52 years ago
- Ground: Moakley Park
- Coach: (Australia) Fred Clark
Team kit

Official website
- www.oldgoldrugby.com

The Old Gold Rugby Football Club is a rugby union team based in Boston, Massachusetts, USA. The club competes in, and is governed by, the New England Rugby Football Union, the Northeast Rugby Union, and USA Rugby. The team currently fields sides in Division II and Division IV in NERFU.

Old Gold Rugby Football Club was founded in Boston, Massachusetts by a group of Boston College Alumni and has competed in New England and toured the globe since it was founded in the Fall of 1974.

== History ==
Old Gold Rugby Football Club was founded in Boston, Massachusetts by a group of Boston College Alumni and has competed in New England and toured the globe since it was founded in the Fall of 1974. The team is steeped with history and tradition.

Each fall Old Gold competes in the NERFU League against clubs throughout New England and New York. Old Gold fields teams in the Second and Fourth Divisions. Old Gold has won the Second Division of New England a number of times.

Old Gold is the home for many players from around the world. Its current list boasts players from countries such as Australia, Tonga, South Africa, England, Ireland, Canada and more.

Old Gold has an extensive history of tours. Within the United States, the club annually plays in one of the nation's greatest tournaments, the Saranac Lake Can-Am Rugby Tournament. Other tournaments include Savannah, Georgia, St. Patrick's Day Tournament, the Connecticut Cup, Portland Tournament, the Harvard, Newport, New York and Worcester 7's, and the New England 10's.

Old Gold celebrated its 25th anniversary in 2000 with a tour of the Bahamas Islands. Prior to that, in 1996 it toured the Grand Cayman Islands. Its 20th-anniversary tour landed was in Australia 1994. Other tours include England/Wales 1991, Ireland/Scotland 1987, Bahamas 1983. Also, a few members traveled to South Africa for the 1995 World Cup and were able to attend the championship match between South Africa and New Zealand.
