= NRFC =

NRFC may refer to:

- Nakhon Ratchasima F.C.
- Newbury R.F.C.
- Newington Rangers F.C.
- Newlyn RFC
- Newport RFC
- Newport Rugby Football Club (Rhode Island)
- Nomads RFC
- Northern Rangers Football Club
- Northolt Rugby Football Club
- Nottingham R.F.C.
- Nottinghamians RFC
- Nuneaton R.F.C.
- Norwich R.F.C.
