= Beast of the East =

Beast of the East may refer to:

- Beast of the East (rugby), a college rugby tournament
- Beast of the East (wrestling), a high school wrestling tournament
- Killington Ski Resort, a ski area in the northeast United States

== See also ==
- Beast from the East (disambiguation)
