= South Shore Anchors =

(United States) South Shore Anchors
- Full name: South Shore Anchors Rugby Football Club
- Union: USA Rugby
- Founded: 1999
- League: NERFU Division I

Official website
- www.ssrugby.com

The South Shore Anchors Rugby Football Club is a rugby union team based in Weymouth, Massachusetts, United States. The club competes in, and is governed by, the New England Rugby Football Union (their LAU), the Northeast Rugby Union (their TAU), and USA Rugby.

The team has about 30-40 active players and is member of Division I of the New England Rugby Football Union.
