= Charles River Rats =

US rugby union club, based in Boston, MA

(United States) Charles River
- Full name: Charles River Rugby Football Club
- Union: New England Rugby Football Union
- Nickname: The River Rats
- Founded: 1973; 53 years ago
- Ground(s): Joe Moakley Park; Boston
- President: Owen McElhinney (Men's); Maria Sedjo (Women's)
- Coach(es): Ryan Hargraves (Men's); Maggie Conley (Women's)
- League(s): NERFU Senior Division II (Men); Senior Division II (Women)
Team kit

Official website
- www.charlesriverrugby.com

Charles River Rugby Football Club, nicknamed The Rats, is an American rugby union club based in Boston which currently competes in New England Rugby Football Union. Charles River has also a women's section.

== History ==
In 1973, the Charles River Rugby Football Club, affectionately dubbed "The Rats", was founded by a group of ruggers from Tufts University and Boston Rugby Football Club. In striking green and orange jerseys that quickly became the club's trademark, the Rats achieved many early successes, including winning the Portland RFC Invitational and advancing to the Annual New England Tournament semi-finals. The Rats continued to attract new players and build on each year's accomplishments over the next decade, thus solidifying themselves as a fixture in the New England rugby community.

In 1980, the Rats earned promotion to New England Division I thanks to a staggering defeat of the renowned Berlin Strollers. The early eighties were busy for the club, as the men concentrated on augmenting club membership via a merger with the Old North Bridge RFC of Concord, MA. Highlights of the eighties include continual success both in New England and in international tournament play. In 1985, Charles River placed 2nd in NERFU Division I, qualifying them for the national playoffs: the team defeated Binghamton RFC in the first round, then lost to Old Blue RFC of NYC (16-6), which ended up advancing to the national finals. In the fall of 1986, the club defeated Boston RFC 12-9, eliminating them from the playoffs for the first time in 5 years.

The Club settled into a restructured Division II in 1992 and held the top seed in the Division. In 1992, the Club went on Tour to Ireland playing Suttonians RFC, Ballinrobe RFC, Dolphin RFC, and De La Salle Palmerston RFC. The team followed the Tour in 1992 with a Tour to Wales in 1995 playing Risca RFC, Trebanos RFC, and Bletchley RFC. The Team held the top seed in Division II for a number of years.

The club failed to post a winning season again until the fall of 2005 when the men's side, under coach Fergal Hehir, made it to the playoffs. They defeated Rockaway RFC in the first playoff game in the spring of 2006 and lost to Montauk RFC in the second game. Under Hehir's tenure, Charles River's men's side ran four winning seasons in a row. In 2008, Hehir stepped down and the following January, the club came under the direction of Anthony Adams former player with the Boston Irish Wolfhounds RFC.

After going winless in Adams' first league season (fall 2009), the Rat's men's side was almost relegated down to Division III, but managed to argue their case to stay in Division II. They were put in the new Daly Conference of Division II. In 2010, another South African, Hylton Haynes, took over as Men's coach.

Currently, the Rat's men's side competes in Division II, being promoted back after a strong run to the Division III National Final Four in 2024. In 2015, the Rat's men's side advanced to the Division III NERFU Cup finals, eventually losing to the Springfield Rifles RFC. In the fall of 2017 they beat out Old Gold RFC to earn a spot in playoffs. They have competed successfully at the top of the table, making the playoffs in each of the past 7 seasons, starting in 2017. In 2022, after an undefeated regular season, the Rats made a run at a title, after capturing NERFU's championship and defeating Lehigh Valley RFC (PA) in the Atlantic Super Regional Round of 16. They came up just short in the Round of 8, losing to Union County RFC (NJ) 15-14 in the Atlantic Super Regional Championship. Currently, in 2024, Charles River's Men's team has made history once again, with a run culminating in a National Championship Final 4 appearance, set for May 17–19, 2024. Charles River capped a 7-1 regular season with a hard fought 24-22 victory over a strong Boston Irish Wolfhounds 2nd XV, followed by a 34-12 win over a blossoming rival in Lehigh Valley RFC (PA) in the Round of 16, and a 30-24 victory against a strong Old Blue RFC (NY) side in the Atlantic Super Regional Championship. This marks the furthest that any Charles River team has ever made it.

2005 also marked the first season of the Lady Rats, a women's team to complement the men's team. The women had a successful winning first season, fielding a competitive side in all of their matches. In 2007, they went undefeated in Division III and were promoted to Division II. In the NERFU realignment in 2009, they were placed in Division III. In May 2011, they won the Division III championship. Since then, and multiple NERFU realignments, Charles River Women's RFC is currently competing in DII. In 2017 they made the playoffs for the second time in their history, and fell in the second round.

In 2023, the club celebrated its 50th anniversary. The Rats men's side has been running about 50 active players per season and the women's side has been running about 40 players.

In 2024, The Rats successfully made it to the National Final Fours before falling to Colusa County in a hard-fought close encounter in Austin, Texas.

== Division ==
The Charles River Lady Rats are a part of the New England Rugby Football Union, Senior Women's Division II. In this division, they compete with:

- Burlington WRFC
- Hartford Wild Roses
- Providence WRFC
- Worcester WRFC
- Portland, Maine (PWRFC)
- North Shore Monsoons WRFC
- Upper Valley WRFC

The Charles River Rats are a part of the New England Rugby Football Union, Senior Men's Division II in the Northern Conference. In this division, they compete with:

- Worcester RFC
- Mystic River RFC 2nd XV
- Newport RFC
- Boston RFC
- Boston Irish Wolfhounds 1st XV
- Hartford RFC
- Portland RFC

During their history, they have merged with the following clubs while retaining the name Charles River:

- Old North Bridge RFC (1981)(based in Concord, MA)
- Hanscom Hawks RFC (1987) (based on Hanscom AFB)
- Dracut RFC (1995)
