= New London County RFC =

New London County Whales
- Full name: New London County Rugby Football Club
- Union: USA Rugby
- Nickname: NLC
- Founded: 2003
- Ground(s): Clark Lane Middle School; Waterford, CT
- League: NERFU Division III
Team kit

Official website
- www.nlrugby.org

The New London County Rugby Football Club (NLCRFC) is a men’s rugby club playing in the New England Rugby Football Union Division 3. Matches are played in the Spring and Fall against sides from Connecticut, Maine, Massachusetts, New Hampshire, New York and Vermont.
