= East Coast Rugby Conference =

- Sport: Rugby union
- Founded: 2011; 15 years ago
- First season: 2011
- Organizing body: URugby
- No. of teams: 7
- Country: U.S.
- Region: Northeastern United States
- Most recent champion: Middlebury College
- Most titles: Middlebury College(2)

The East Coast Rugby Conference is a college rugby conference, founded in 2011 after USA Rugby decided that collegiate rugby teams would leave their local area unions and form independent conferences. Seven teams participated in the inaugural season.

In 2012, the league expanded and added an eighth team, with American International College joining the league as an associate member. They were voted into full membership for the Fall 2013 league season.

== Members ==
Institution	Club	Estab.
Northeastern	Northeastern University RC	1984
Boston College	Boston College RFC	1967
Fairfield	Fairfield University RFC	1963
Massachusetts Amherst	UMass Minutemen	
Connecticut	UConn Huskies	
Middlebury	Middlebury College RFC	1972
Albany	Great Danes	
American International	Yellow Jackets	

== 2011 ==
Boston College played at the 2011 Collegiate Rugby Championship. The CRC, held every June at PPL Park in Philadelphia, is the highest profile college rugby tournament in the US, and is broadcast live on NBC. The opening round of fixtures took place on September 17, 2011. Northeastern won the conference's inaugural season, earning a bid to the round of 16 of the D1-AA tournament. The conference also hosted a 7's tournament on November 5, with the winner getting an automatic bid to the USA Rugby Sevens Collegiate National Championships. Boston College defeated the University of Albany 36–10 in the final, but declined the bid to the national championships.

=== Final standings ===
Position	Team	G	W	L	D	PF	PA	PD	TB	LB	Pts
1	Northeastern University	6	6	0	0	226	27	+199	5	0	29
2	Boston College	6	4	2	0	112	87	+25	2	1	19
3	Middlebury College	6	3	3	0	135	107	+28	3	2	17
4	University of Massachusetts	6	3	3	0	90	96	−6	2	1	15
5	University of Albany	6	2	4	0	120	170	−50	2	2	12
6	Southern Connecticut	6	2	4	0	55	154	−99	0	0	8
7	University of Connecticut	6	1	5	0	70	167	−97	1	0	5

== 2012 ==
The opening round of fixtures for the 2012 season will take place on September 15. The 2nd annual East Coast Rugby Conference 7's tournament was won by Northeastern University, who defeated Middlebury College 12-7 in the final. Northeastern accepted their bid to the 2012 USA Rugby Sevens Collegiate National Championships, and were joined by Middlebury, who accepted an at-large bid. Both teams performed admirably, with Middlebury posting a 2-3 record for the tournament, losing 14-7 to defending Division 1-AA champion Davenport University in the Shield semi-final. Northeastern finished 2-1 in their group, losing only to defending 7's national champion Life University on the first day, followed by a second day loss to Cal Poly in the quarterfinals.

=== Final standings ===
Position	Team	G	W	L	D	PF	PA	PD	TB	LB	Pts
1	Middlebury College	7	6	1	0	295	95	+200	5	1	30
2	Boston College	7	6	1	0	191	84	+107	2	1	27
3	Northeastern University	7	5	2	0	211	121	+90	4	1	25
4	University of Albany	7	3	4	0	191	230	−39	5	3	20
5	American International College	7	3	4	0	163	144	19	3	1	16
6	Southern Connecticut	7	2	5	0	156	250	−94	4	2	14
7	University of Massachusetts	7	2	5	0	135	175	−40	3	2	13
8	University of Connecticut	7	1	6	0	79	322	−243	1	1	6

== 2013 ==
Southern Connecticut has dropped out of the ECRC, no replacement named.

=== Final standings ===
Position	Team	G	W	L	D	PF	PA	PD	TB	LB	Pts
1	Middlebury College	6	6	0	0	305	74	+231	6	0	30
2	American International College	6	5	1	0	170	110	+60	4	0	24
3	Boston College	6	4	2	0	147	102	+45	2	0	18
4	Northeastern University	6	3	3	0	150	142	+8	2	1	15
5	University of Massachusetts	6	2	4	0	106	142	-36	1	0	9
6	University of Albany	6	1	5	0	131	238	−107	1	0	5
7	University of Connecticut	6	0	6	0	66	267	−201	0	0	0
