= Sid Watson =

American football player and ice hockey coach (1932–2004)

Biographical details
- Born: May 4, 1932; Andover, Massachusetts, U.S.
- Died: April 25, 2004 (aged 71); Naples, Florida, U.S.
- Education: Northeastern

Coaching career (HC unless noted)
- 1959–1983: Bowdoin

Administrative career (AD unless noted)
- 1981–1998: Bowdoin

Head coaching record
- Overall: 327–210–14 (.606)

Accomplishments and honors

Championships
- 1969 ECAC 2 Champion; 1970 ECAC 2 Champion; 1971 ECAC 2 Champion; 1971 ECAC 2 Tournament Champion; 1972 ECAC 2 Champion; 1975 ECAC 2 Tournament Champion; 1976 ECAC 2 Tournament Champion; 1978 ECAC 2 East Champion; 1978 ECAC 2 East Tournament Champion; 1980 ECAC 2 East Champion

Awards
- 1955 NFL kickoff return yards leader 1966 UPI New England Coach of the Year; 1969 Clark Holder Award; 1970 Edward Jeremiah Award; 1970 Clark Holder Award; 1971 Edward Jeremiah Award; 1976 UPI Eastern Small College Coach of the Year; 1978 Edward Jeremiah Award; 1983 Schaeffer Pen Award; 2001 Hobey Baker Legends of College Hockey; U.S. Hockey Hall of Fame; Northeastern University Athletic Hall of Fame; Maine Sports Hall of Fame; Andover, Massachusetts Hall of Fame 2005 Massachusetts Hockey Hall of Fame

Football career

No. 39, 41
- Position: Halfback

Career information
- High school: Punchard (MA)
- College: Northeastern

Career history
- Pittsburgh Steelers (1955–1957); Washington Redskins (1958)

Career statistics
- Games played: 45
- Rushing yards: 516
- Receiving yards: 423
- Kick return yards: 1,269
- Total touchdowns: 6
- Stats at Pro Football Reference

Sidney John Watson (May 4, 1932 – April 25, 2004) was an American football player and college ice hockey player and coach. He played halfback in the National Football League (NFL) for the Pittsburgh Steelers and Washington Redskins. He played college football at Northeastern University. He was also the head hockey coach at Bowdoin College from 1959 to 1983.

== Early life ==
Watson was born in Andover, Massachusetts and attended Punchard High School.

== College career ==
Watson attended and played football as a running back at Northeastern University, where he averaged more than 100 rushing yards per game and 7.1 yards per carry during his career. He played on Northeastern's 1951 undefeated team, and was chosen Little All America in 1953 and captained the 1954 team. He still holds Northeastern's school records for most single-season points (74) and held the record for most career points (191) until 1997. In addition to lettering in football for three years, Watson also received one letter in basketball and three in ice hockey.

== Professional football career ==
After graduating from college, Watson played in the National Football League for the Pittsburgh Steelers from 1955 to 1957. He then played with the Washington Redskins in 1958.

== Hockey coaching career ==
On December 23, 1958, Watson was named head coach of the Bowdoin College ice hockey team for the remainder of the season. He succeeded Nels Corey, who was named head football coach. While coach, he led the Polar Bears to the ECAC 2 playoffs 16 times and won conference championships in 1971, 1975, 1976 and 1978. He was awarded the Eddie Jeremiah Memorial Trophy, recognizing the national Small College Coach of the year in 1970, 1971 and 1978. He stepped down at the end of the 1982–83 season to focus on his duties as athletic director. His career record is 324–208–11.

=== Head coaching record ===
Record table
Season	Team	Overall	Conference	Standing	Postseason
Bowdoin Polar Bears Independent (1959–1961)
1959–60	Bowdoin	11–11–0			
1960–61	Bowdoin	15–5–0			
Bowdoin:		26–16–0			
Bowdoin Polar Bears (ECAC Hockey) (1961–1964)
1961–62	Bowdoin	11–11–1	10–11–0	16th	
1962–63	Bowdoin	6–13–0	5–13–0	23rd	
1963–64	Bowdoin	14–8–0	12–8–0	11th	
Bowdoin:		31–32–1	27–32–0		
Bowdoin Polar Bears (ECAC 2) (1964–1983)
1964–65	Bowdoin	11–10–0	9–5–0	4th	
1965–66	Bowdoin	11–8–1	9–3–1	2nd	
1966–67	Bowdoin	9–11–0	8–4–0	T–5th	
1967–68	Bowdoin	11–9–1	9–5–1	8th	
1968–69	Bowdoin	14–6–1	12–3–1	1st	
1969–70	Bowdoin	19–3–0	13–0–0	1st	ECAC 2 Runner-Up
1970–71	Bowdoin	19–4–1	14–2–0	1st	ECAC 2 Champion
1971–72	Bowdoin	17–4–0	14–1–0	1st	
1972–73	Bowdoin	14–8–2	11–4–1	6th	ECAC 2 Runner-Up
1973–74	Bowdoin	8–14–0	6–8–0	14th	
1974–75	Bowdoin	14–9–0	11–5–0	4th	ECAC 2 Champion
1975–76	Bowdoin	18–9–0	13–3–0	3rd	ECAC 2 Champion
1976–77	Bowdoin	16–7–0	13–2–0	4th	ECAC 2 Quarterfinals
1977–78	Bowdoin	19–6–1	13–3–1	2nd	ECAC 2 East Champion
1978–79	Bowdoin	13–12–0	10–7–0	12th	ECAC 2 East Quarterfinals
1979–80	Bowdoin	19–5–2	14–2–2	2nd	ECAC 2 East Semifinals
1980–81	Bowdoin	14–12–0	11–7–0	11th	ECAC 2 East Semifinals
1981–82	Bowdoin	13–12–3	11–8–0	12th	ECAC 2 East Quarterfinals
1982–83	Bowdoin	11–13–1	9–8–1	13th	ECAC 2 East Quarterfinals
Bowdoin:		270–162–13	210–80–8		
Total:		327–210–14			
National champion Postseason invitational champion Conference regular season champion Conference regular season and conference tournament champion Division regular season champion Division regular season and conference tournament champion Conference tournament champion

== Administrator career ==
From 1981 to 1999, Watson was Bowdoin's Athletic Director. He was also the chairman of the NCAA ice Hockey Rules and Tournament Committee for six years, and served as president, vice president, secretary, treasurer and a member of the board of governors of the American College Hockey Coaches Association.

== Honors ==
Watson was inducted into the United States Hockey Hall of Fame in 1999. In 2001, he was awarded the prestigious Hobey Baker Legends of College Hockey Award.

In 1996, Bowdoin dedicated the Sidney J. Watson Fitness Facility in his honor. In 2004, following Watson's death, the Division III Men's Player of the Year Award was renamed the Sid Watson Award. In 2009, Bowdoin named their new ice hockey arena the Sidney J. Watson Arena, which holds approximately 2,300 spectators and is Leadership in Energy and Environmental Design (LEED) certified.

== Personal life ==
Watson was married and had five children and 11 grandchildren. He died after suffering a Myocardial infarction in Naples, Florida on April 25, 2004.

Awards and achievements
Preceded by Award Created; Bill Riley Jr.	Edward Jeremiah Award; 1969–70, 1970–71; 1977–78	Succeeded by Jack Canniff; Don Brose
Preceded by Bob Peters	Hobey Baker Legends of College Hockey Award; 2002	Succeeded by Lefty Smith
