= Ann Barford =

Rugby union career
- Position: Center
Senior career
Years	Team	Apps	(Points)
- Metropolitan Rugby Union
–	East All-Star		
–	Monmouth Rugby Club		
International career
Years	Team	Apps	(Points)
1991	United States		

Ann Barford is a former female rugby union player. She was a member of the 1991 Women's Rugby World Cup champion squad.

She is the Director of IT at Corning Inc. She has a Master's degree in Computer Science from New Jersey Institute of Technology and a Bachelor's degree in Chemistry from Douglass College, Rutgers University. She is on the Board of Directors for the USA Rugby Trust.
