= Monmouth Rugby Club =

Monmouth
- Full name: Monmouth Rugby Football Club
- Union: Empire Geographical Union
- Founded: 1973; 53 years ago
- Ground: Thompson Park
- President: Peter Terilli
- Coach: Chris Wagner
- Captain: Kieran Walsh
Team kit

Official website
- monmouthrugbyclub.com

The Monmouth Rugby Football Club is a rugby union team in Division 1I of the Empire Geographical Union based in Monmouth County, New Jersey.

== History ==
The Monmouth Rugby Football Club was founded as the Brookdale College Rugby Football Club in the Fall of 1973 by Doug Coil and Steve Barberio who were teachers at the college. Brookdale suffered as all young clubs do through several undistinguished seasons, even changing its colors several times as not to be recognized the next season! As the years passed, the club's players and leadership developed and the club eventually found itself playing in the Metropolitan Division I in the late 1970s.

The early 1980s saw some strong play by the now Monmouth Rugby Football Club and with some close loses to some perennially powerful clubs. In 1984, the team moved back to Division II and experienced some more tough seasons / years. The early 1990s brought the winning tradition back to Monmouth with a Jersey Cup championship and a return to Division I rugby. After some tough injuries and a few early retirements, the club suffered a couple of rough seasons. Since 1994, the club has won three of four second side Jersey Cup championships and has appeared in the National playoff picture 5 times in the past 10 years. The club has made the quarterfinals twice within the 5 appearances, both years suffering close losses to Snake River, Idaho.

After an undefeated season in 2002, Monmouth was again brought up to Division I rugby in the Met Union. The club, coping with a declining membership and difficult scheduling, endured for three years on the Division I level. The prospect of the Super League and competing against a larger population base brought them back to Division II. During the 1990s Monmouth has won the Jersey Cup Tournament three times and placed second in the premier division in the Saranc Lake Tournament.

Monmouth Rugby Club has started the 2009 fall season by winning the Jersey Shore Tournament's Premier bracket with wins over Schuylkill River, Reading and New York Rugby Club. The 2009 fall season finished with Monmouth being beaten by Middlesex, MA in the semifinal of the Northeast Championships on Randall's Island, leaving Monmouth Ranked 4th in the Northeast.

Monmouth started the Fall 2010 season by winning their own invitational tournament, beating Princeton Athletic Club in the Final. Monmouth finished the Division 1 regular season 4 - 4. This put Monmouth in the NE crossovers against Boston Irish Wolfhounds who had just come down to D1 from SuperLeague. The step up was too much for Monmouth and they were well beaten by the Wolfhounds in Canton.

Monmouth finished the 2011 Fall season as the #1 ranked team in MetUnion Division 1.

== First XV Honors ==
=== Club Championships ===
- EGU Division 3 Champions 2022
- WOMEN'S Division 2 (Empire GU) Champions -2017
- Division 2 (Empire GU) Champions- 2014
- Division 1 Metropolitan New York Rugby Union #1 Rank - 2011
- Division 2 Metropolitan New York Rugby Union Champions - 2002

=== Tournament Championships ===
- Jersey Shore Tournament Champions - 2002, 2009, 2010
- Jersey Cup Tournament Champions - 2003, 2004, 2005
- Saranac Lake Can-Am Tournament - Club Division – 2nd Place 2004
- Four Leafs Tournament Champions - 2009

== Notable players ==
Note: caps and participation are accurate as of 23 April 2007

=== USA Eagles ===
==== Past Eagles ====
- Mike Liscovitz (capped vs Canada 05/21/1977, England 10/15/1977, Canada 05/28/1978)
- Nancy Breen (capped vs Canada 09/03/1989)
- Anne Barford
