= Brooklyn Rugby =

US rugby union club, based in Brooklyn, NY

- Full name: Brooklyn Rugby Football Club
- Union: USA Rugby
- Nickname(s): BKRFC, Hyenas (W), The Barons (M)
- Founded: 2007; 19 years ago
- Location: Brooklyn, New York City
- Ground(s): Kaiser Park, 2529 Neptune Ave, Brooklyn, NY 11224
- Coach(es): (United States) Toby Tornay (M) (Trinidad and Tobago) Wayne Kelly (W)
- Captain(s): (United States) Josiah Ruhland (M), (United States) Logan Hankla (W)
- League(s): Division II (women); Division III NYC (men)

Official website
- www.brooklynrugby.com

Brooklyn Rugby Football Club is a rugby union club founded in 2007 and based in Brooklyn, New York. The club competes in the Empire Geographic Union and is a member of USA Rugby. The women's team plays at the Division II level and the men's team plays at Division III level.

== Club history ==
=== Founding ===
Brooklyn Rugby Football Club was founded in 2007 by a small group of former college and club players looking to build a competitive and community-oriented club in Brooklyn. At the time, New York City had several clubs within the five boroughs, including NYAC Rugby, Old Blue, the Village Lions, Landsdown Rugby, Rockaway, and Old Maroon. There were, however, no rugby teams in the city's largest borough of Brooklyn.

In 2007, the core group of players, who would start the club, played that season for the NY Americans (who later merged with another club to form the Kingston Mad Dogs). Since traveling to games for the NY Americans was becoming cost-prohibitive, the core members started a club in Brooklyn, which would later be named Brooklyn Rugby Football Club.

In the early days, the club was fully sponsored by Barons Brewing Company of Sydney, Australia, and, in line with this sponsorship, was named the Brooklyn Barons Rugby Football Club. Barons eventually pulled their sponsorship in light of the economic downturn in 2008, and the club re-branded itself as Brooklyn Rugby Football Club.

The club started in the Metropolitan Rugby Football Union Division III, which is the fourth tier of United States Rugby.

=== Merging With the women's club ===
In 2014 the Brooklyn Rugby Football Club and the Brooklyn Women's Rugby Football Club, two separate clubs throughout their histories, merged and became one club with one governing body. The club known as Brooklyn Rugby Football Club now provides rugby playing opportunities to all genders in the Brooklyn area.

=== Founding men's members ===
- (New Zealand) Mike Haynes (coach)
- (United States) Justin Knight
- (United States) Keith Weiss
- (United States) Geoffrey Gordon
- (United States) Brian Benito
- (United States) Joshua Magnas

=== Founding women's members ===
- (United States) Jaimee Lynn Nelson
- (United States) Meghan Burke

Brooklyn Women's Rugby Club was founded in 2007.

== Men's team history ==
=== Mike Haynes era ===
Brooklyn Rugby started its first league season with coach and founder Michael Haynes at the helm and Captain Geoffrey Gordon leading the team on the field. Fellow core founding members Justin Knight, Keith Weiss, and Joshua Magnas helped fill out the inaugural team. In 2008, Brooklyn Rugby finished in second place in their inaugural fall season. The team lost in the final to eventual NRU champions Danbury Rugby Club, who went on to be promoted to Division II.

In 2009, Brooklyn Rugby won its first two trophies, winning both the Four Leaf 15's Tournament hosted by the Village Lions and the North Bay Grey Ghost Cup hosted by North Bay rugby.

In the 2009 campaign, Brooklyn Rugby lost two games in the regular season but secured a playoff berth thanks to a last-minute penalty goal against Hudson Valley. In the playoffs, Brooklyn Rugby avenged their regular season loss to Rockaway Rugby Football Club on Rockaway's home field. Brooklyn eventually lost in the Met Union Final to eventual NRU champions North Jersey RFC. This was Brooklyn's second year in the final in as many fall seasons.

=== Undefeated season ===
Brooklyn Rugby came into the 2010 season as one of the favorites to finish in first place. On October 21, 2010, Brooklyn Rugby completed an undefeated season with a 59–0 home win over the Rockland Rogues. The undefeated regular season included a 15–10 away win over rival Rockaway. However, Rockaway were to overturn this result in the D3 Championship final 23-14. Brooklyn still earned the 5th seed in the NRU playoffs, which meant that Brooklyn had to travel to Boston to play MIT in the first round. After a back and forth game Brooklyn was able to win a tough game on the road 15-14. The result gave Brooklyn their first NRU playoff victory and granted them entry to the Northeast Final Four, along with rival Rockaway, Saratoga and Brooklyn's semi-final opponent the Syracuse Chargers. Brooklyn would lose its semi-final encounter with Syracuse but would come out strong in the consolation game against Saratoga to secure 3rd place in the NRU, Brooklyn's best finish in its history.

=== 2nd Mike Haynes era ===
2011 saw the return of founding coach Mike Haynes to the team as the head coach with the retirement of Tri Do. Brooklyn's 2011 spring season saw a competitive schedule with some positive results against top tier opponents, but they were denied promotion by the union. Brooklyn Rugby Football club were informed that they would remain in DIII for the upcoming fall 2011 season.

In August 2011 it was announced that Brooklyn Rugby FC's new main sponsor would be the Black Grouse, a brand of Scotch whisky produced by the Edrington Group, makers of The Famous Grouse. Brooklyn Rugby's crest was changed to reflect this new relationship as the rugby ball in the upper left hand quadrant of the crest was changed to an image of a grouse.

2011 saw Brooklyn Rugby have another successful regular season campaign, finishing the season with five victories and one loss, including a home win over top ranked Montclair RFC. For the second straight year Brooklyn Rugby would host a home semifinal against Suffolk RFC, who had beaten Brooklyn for the first time in their history in the regular season. The semi-final was played in a winter nor'easter but the players fought through the freezing rain and snow to play the game, which was won by Brooklyn 10-0. Brooklyn met Montclair in the final, Brooklyn's fourth in as many years. Brooklyn were outmatched on the day by a clinical and physical Montclair side and lost the final 41-10.

=== Empire GU and Jeff Dincher era ===
2012 saw Brooklyn Rugby take the field in a more competitive and restructured Division III under the newly formed Empire GU. The season was the first in charge for new head coach Jeff Dincher. Brooklyn RFC dropped their first two games of the season. They had a loss to Old Blue in the season opener and a lopsided loss to yearly league rival Suffolk at their home field. Brooklyn RFC bounced back with successive wins over Rockland RFC and Old Maroon. Brooklyn RFC's next match was a tough test against newly relegated side North Jersey. The team comported themselves well with a 12–12 draw at Nojo's home turf. Brooklyn finished the season with a tough road draw to a much improved Hudson Valley side and a lopsided win over city rival Gotham Knights. Brooklyn RFC finished 4th in the standings and missed the playoffs.

=== Division restructure and Daniel Newcombe era ===
After a series of friendlies in the spring season of 2013, Jeff Dincher stepped down as coach of Brooklyn Rugby. His departure coincided with a number of changes to the Empire GU's league structure, particularly in the lower divisions. The changes that affected Brooklyn the most were new teams (formerly from D2 of the Empire GU) entering the division. Furthermore, league matches were now to be contested across both the fall and spring seasons - previously all league activity took place in the fall. In the absence of a new coach, player and former captain Daniel Newcombe stepped in as coach of the team, while continuing his position as a hooker for the club. Newcombe was joined on the coaching staff by former player Jason Maschi, as the attacking play coach, and former coach Jeff Dincher, as the club's defensive play coach.

Brooklyn's inaugural season in the restructured Division III South started promisingly with away wins over Montauk and Connecticut Yankees. These successive victories were followed by a tough 7-14 loss to league leaders Lansdowne RFC, a 10-7 away defeat to local rivals Rockaway, a lopsided 38-5 to second-placed Old Blue and a tough away visit to Danbury that resulted in a score of 36-17 to the home team. Galvanized by this string of losses, Brooklyn finished out the first half of their 2013/14 league season with a decisive 50-0 victory over Hudson Valley. The league season restarted in March 2014 with a 22-0 win over Suffolk in extremely adverse weather conditions. A closely fought contest against NoJo followed, with a final score of 13-10 to Brooklyn. This win was notable due to it being the first time the club had beaten NoJo in regular league play. Brooklyn's final result of the 2013-14 league season was a 21-17 win over Bayonne, meaning the club finished the second half of their league season undefeated. Overall, Brooklyn finished 4th out of 11 in the division, an improvement on the previous year given the increased size of the division and tougher competition.

=== Season history ===
==== Empire GU league results ====
| Season | Div | Pos | Played | Won | Lost | Drawn |
|---|---|---|---|---|---|---|
| 2008 | III | 2nd | 7 | 5 | 2 | 0 |
| 2009 | III | 3rd | 7 | 5 | 2 | 0 |
| 2010 | III | 1st | 7 | 7 | 0 | 0 |
| 2011 | III | 2nd | 6 | 5 | 1 | 0 |
| 2012 | III | 4th | 7 | 3 | 2 | 2 |
| 2013 | III South | 4th | 10 | 6 | 4 | 0 |
| 2014 | III NYC | 4th | 7 | 4 | 3 | 0 |
| 2015 | III NYC | 2nd | 10 | 8 | 2 | 0 |
| 2016 | III South | 4th | 8 | 2 | 6 | 0 |
| 2016 | III South | 4th | 5 | 4 | 1 | 0 |
| 2017 | III - NY | 2nd | 8 | 5 | 3 | 0 |

==== Met Union/Empire GU playoff results ====
| Season | Division | Seed | Round | Won | Lost |
|---|---|---|---|---|---|
| 2008 | III | 2nd | Final | 1 | 1 |
| 2009 | III | 3rd | Final | 1 | 1 |
| 2010 | III | 1st | Final | 1 | 1 |
| 2011 | III | 2nd | Final | 1 | 1 |
| 2014 | III | 4th | First Rd | 0 | 1 |
| 2015 | III | 6th | First Rd | 0 | 1 |

==== Northeast Rugby Union playoff results ====
| Season | Division | Seed | Round | Won | Lost |
|---|---|---|---|---|---|
| 2008 | III | 4th | Quarter final | 0 | 1 |
| 2009 | III | 5th | Quarter final | 0 | 1 |
| 2010 | III | 5th | Semi-final | 2 | 1 |

=== Honors ===
==== Empire Geographic Union/Metropolitan Rugby Football Union ====
Division III Championship

Playoff Runner-up (4) - 2008, 2009, 2010, 2011

Regular season titles (1) - 2010

=== Northeast Rugby Football Union ===
Division III

Playoff Berths - 2008, 2009, 2010

=== Tournaments ===
4 Leaf 15's Tournament NYC

Participant - 2009, 2011

Social Division Champions - 2009

North Bay Grey Ghost Cup - Maryland

Participant - 2009, 2010

Tournament Champions - 2009

Long Island Mother's Day Tournament

Participant - 2007, 2008, 2011

Runners Up (1) - 2011

CAN-AMS Rugby Tournament

Participant - 2011–2013

Consolation Champions - 2013

=== International tours ===
Turks and Caicos 2012:

Results:

TCIRFC President's XV 10 - Brooklyn Rugby 5

TCIRFC First XV 27 - Brooklyn Rugby 0

== Women's team history ==
The women's team was established in 2007 by Jaimee Lynn Nelson and joined the men's team in 2014 to form Brooklyn Rugby Club.

Since then, they have played consistently in the Empire GU Division II league, fielding 15s teams for fall (competitive season), and Spring (social season). The team also fields a 7s team in the summer months from June through August.

The team is open to players from all walks of life.

=== Notable events ===
The Women's team has had winning seasons since 2017 going to playoffs in 2017, 2018, 2019, 2020, 2021, and 2023.

Former Women's Head Coach Nora Westcott won the USA Rugby Coach of the Year in 2018.

=== Honors ===
Ruggerfest 2023 - 2nd Place
Princeton 7s 2023 - 2nd Place
Princeton 7s 2019 - 1st Place
Monmouth 7s 2018 - 1st Place

== Management ==
=== Club personnel ===
- Board of Directors: Sydney Newman, Amy O’Sullivan, Tony Ferraro, Eddie Robb
- Club Chairman: Emily Mason
- Men's Team Coach: Toby Tornay
- Women's Team Coach: Wayne Kelly
- Men's Team Captain: Josiah Ruhland
- Women's Team Captain: Logan Hankla

=== Leadership history ===
Club chairmen

| President/chairman | Dates |
|---|---|
| Justin Knight | 2007 |
| Keith Weiss | 2008–2010 |
| Jason Maschi | 2010–2011 |
| Jorge Quintana | 2011–2012 |
| Nick Anzalone | 2012–2014 |
| Jorge Quintana | 2014–2016 |
| Ben Martin | 2016–2018 |
| Toby Tornay | 2018-2022 |
| Frank Morgera | 2022-2023 |
| Emily Mason | 2024 |

Men's coaching history

| Name | Dates |
|---|---|
| Michael Haynes | 2007–2010 |
| Tri Do | 2010 |
| Daniel Newcombe | 2010-2011 |
| Michael Haynes | 2011–2012 |
| Jeff Dincher | 2012–2013 |
| Daniel Newcombe | 2013–2024 |
| Toby Tornay | 2025-Present |

Men's captains

| Name | Dates |
|---|---|
| Geoffrey Gordon | 2007–2009 |
| Daniel Newcombe | 2010–2012 |
| Andy Bartlett | 2012–2013 |
| Alexander Hanhart | 2013–2014 |
| Mike Reilly | 2014–2016 |
| Mark O'Donnell | 2016–2022 |
| Justin MacDonald | 2022–2024 |
| Josiah Ruhland | 2025-Present |

== Club awards ==
=== Hall of Fame ===
| Year of induction | Inductee |
|---|---|
| 2014 | Keith Weiss |
| 2014 | Justin Knight |
| 2015 | Josh Magnas |
| 2015 | Mike Haynes |
| 2015 | Hailee Lanker |
| 2017 | Brian Benito |
| 2017 | Matt Loomis |
| 2017 | Geoffrey Gordon |
| 2017 | Gedas Monginas |

=== Keith Weiss Cup ===
The Keith Weiss Cup is awarded by the president to the club member who has, through his on field and off field contributions, given the most to the club as a whole. The award is named after one of the club's first presidents and founding member of the club, Keith Weiss.

| Year | Recipient |
|---|---|
| 2010 | Jorge Quintana |
| 2011 | Daniel Newcombe |
| 2012 | Mario Avocato |
| 2013 | Simon Fong |
| 2014 | PJ Kinsella |
| 2015 | Ben Martin |
| 2016 | Timothy Carroll |
| 2017 | Jane Wade |
| 2018 | Nora Westcott |
| 2019 | Mark O'Donnell |
| 2022 | Alpons Dizon |
| 2023 | Maya Bauer-Moshi |

=== Michael Haynes Cup ===
The Michael Haynes Cup is awarded by the coaching staff to the player who has, through his dedication in practice, on field performance and leadership, contributed most to the team on the field. The award is named after the club's first coach who helped to found the club, Mike Haynes.

| Year | Recipient |
|---|---|
| 2009 | Matt Loomis |
| 2010 | Gedas Monginas |
| 2011 | Sebastien Vante |
| 2012 | Justin McDonald |
| 2013 | Craig Mackenzie |
| 2014 | Edward Tobias Tornay |
| 2015 | Edward Tobias Tornay |
| 2016 | Nick Baldwin |
| 2017 | Mathieu Nerson |
| 2018 | Phil Pepe |
| 2019 | Dylan Bilski |
| 2021 | Sam Sheppard |
| 2022 | Ben Stuckenbrock |
| 2023 | Scott Larsen |

=== Women's Coaches Cup ===
The Women's Coaches Cup is awarded by the coaching staff to the player who has, through her dedication in practice, on field performance and leadership, contributed most to the team on the field.

| Year | Recipient |
|---|---|
| 2014 | Ashleigh Bepko |
| 2015 | Kyla Maxwell |
| 2016 | Robyn Martinich |
| 2017 | Nora Westcott |
| 2018 | Kate Mason |
| 2019 | Max Soo |
| 2021 | Sal Mawhinney |
| 2022 | Laila Blumenthal Rothchild |
| 2023 | Emily "Sandy" Sanderson |

=== Justin Knight Cup ===
The Justin Knight Cup is awarded by the players to the teammate who they believe has, through his dedication in practice, on field performance and leadership, contributed the most to the team on the field. The award is named after club founder and legendary player, Justin Knight.

| Year | Recipient |
|---|---|
| 2010 | Jacques Pons |
| 2011 | Edward Tobias Tornay |
| 2012 | Nick Dorsey |
| 2013 | Mike Reilly |
| 2014 | Justin McDonald |
| 2015 | Errol Jones |
| 2016 | Alexander Coles |
| 2017 | Tim Carroll |
| 2018 | Guillaume Brue |
| 2019 | Phil Pepe |
| 2021 | Keith Van Wickler |
| 2022 | Malcolm Corry |
| 2023 | Matthew Kennelly |

=== Women's Players Cup ===
The Women's Players Cup is awarded by the players to the teammate who they believe has, through her dedication in practice, on field performance and leadership, contributed the most to the team on the field.

| Year | Recipient |
|---|---|
| 2014 | Heather Parton |
| 2015 | Jessica Bade |
| 2016 | Nora Westcott |
| 2017 | Melanie Joaquin |
| 2018 | Robin Martinich |
| 2019 | Janie Wade |
| 2021 | Evie Hansen |
| 2022 | Juliet "Patch" Wade |
| 2023 | Lily Wissinger |

=== Rookie of the Year ===
The Rookie of the Year award is given to the player who has contributed most to the team on the field in his or her first year with the club.

==== Men's club ====
| Year | Recipient |
|---|---|
| 2009 | Justin McDonald |
| 2010 | Kevin Lupo |
| 2011 | Ian Ralls |
| 2012 | Johnny Brennan III |
| 2013 | Mark O'Donnell |
| 2014 | Kamil Ryzko |
| 2015 | Keaton Nasser |
| 2016 | Jack Spiegs |
| 2017 | Guillaume Brue |
| 2018 | Dylan Bilski |
| 2019 | Keith Van Wickler |
| 2021 | Seamus Dugan |
| 2022 | Angus Judkins |
| 2023 | Sean Edling |

==== Women's club ====
| Year | Recipient |
|---|---|
| 2013 | Robyn Martinich |
| 2014 | Ahmit Aharon |
| 2015 | Nora Westcott |
| 2016 | Juliet Wade |
| 2017 | Jane Wade |
| 2018 | Sam Schneider |
| 2019 | Kate Conley |
| 2021 | Laura Friedman |
| 2022 | Clare Coey |
| 2023 | Mads McCormick |

=== Sevens Player of the Year ===
The Sevens Player of the Year is awarded to the player who, through their passion and dedication on the field and in training, contributed the most to the club's Sevens Team.

==== Men's 7's team ====
| Year | Recipient |
|---|---|
| 2013 | Gennaro Anzalone |
| 2014 | Mike Reilly |
| 2015 | Kevin Keebler |
| 2016 | Mark O'Donnell |
| 2017 | Kevin Keebler |
| 2018 | Brandon Buchel |
| 2019 | Sam Sheppard |
| 2021 | Drew Glover |
| 2022 | Drew Glover |
| 2023 | Frank Morgera |

==== Women's 7's team ====
| Year | Recipient |
|---|---|
| 2014 | Kyla Maxwell |
| 2015 | Fedora Francois |
| 2016 | Brenda Doctor |
| 2017 | Not awarded |
| 2018 | Maggie Ewen |
| 2019 | Lily Wissinger |
| 2021 | Maggie Ewen |
| 2022 | Laura Friedman |
| 2023 | Laura Friedman |

=== Josh Magnas Award ===
The Josh Magnas Award is given to the player who, through his or her dedication in training and performance on the field, has shown the most improvement in his skills and play or has made the biggest impact coming back from injury.

==== Men's club ====
| Year | Recipient |
|---|---|
| 2009 | Paul Tierno |
| 2010 | Nick Anzalone |
| 2011 | Dillon Prime |
| 2012 | Brian O'Neill |
| 2013 | Benjamin Martin |
| 2014 | Jake Wyse |
| 2015 | Benjamin "Bino" Deschamps |
| 2016 | Milos Fulton-Peluffo |
| 2017 | Jah Marconi |
| 2018 | Brett Barbosa |
| 2019 | Frank Morgera |
| 2021 | Bo Walder |
| 2022 | Jamie Kuperenas |
| 2023 | Fares Ayoub |

==== Women's club ====
| Year | Recipient |
|---|---|
| 2013 | Lisa Canata |
| 2014 | Crystal Hudson |
| 2015 | Xanaan Salim |
| 2016 | Melanie Joaquin |
| 2017 | Michelle Ogman |
| 2018 | Mel Braccia |
| 2019 | Laura Lynn Duffy |
| 2021 | Emily Sanderson |
| 2022 | Cait McMullen |
| 2023 | Kiara “Kiki” Bryant |
