= Beast from the East (disambiguation) =

Beast from the East is a 1988 live album recorded by Dokken, an American heavy metal band.

Beast from the East may also refer to:

- The Beast from the East (novel), 1996 book, part of the Goosebumps series
- Nikolai Valuev (born 1973), Russian politician and boxer whose nickname is the Beast from the East
- Bam Bam Bigelow (1961–2007), American professional wrestler whose nickname was the Beast from the East
- 2018 British Isles cold wave, official named "Anticyclone Hartmut", a period of cold and snowy weather in February and March 2018
  - Mini Beast from the East, a shorter period of cold weather that occurred two weeks after the 2018 cold wave
- Storm Darcy (February 2021), nicknamed "Beast from the East 2" by the press

== See also ==
- Beast of the East (disambiguation)
