= Sidney J. Watson Arena =

Ice hockey arena in Brunswick, Maine

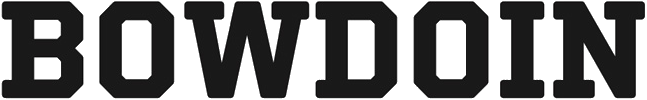

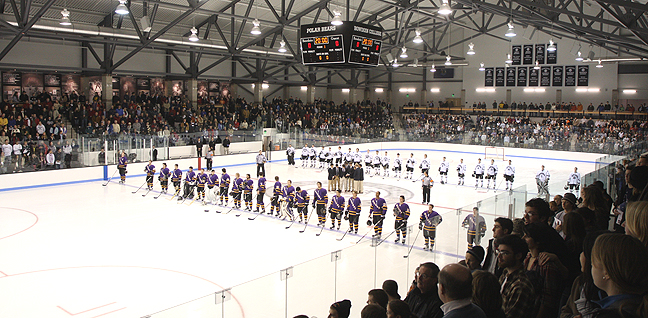
- The arena during an ice hockey game in 2011
- Interactive map of Sidney J. Watson Arena
- Address: Brunswick, Maine; United States
- Coordinates: 43°54′09.14″N 69°57′31.50″W
- Owner: Bowdoin College
- Operator: Bowdoin College Athletics
- Capacity: 1,900
- Type: Ice hockey arena
- Current use: Ice hockey
- Public transit: Downeaster at Brunswick station

Construction
- Opened: January 18, 2009
- Cost: US$20 million
- Architect: Bear Mountain Design
- Services engineer: DeWolfe Engineering Associates
- General contractor: Pro Con Incorporated

Tenants
- Bowdoin Polar Bears men's and women's ice hockey (2009–present)

Website
- athletics.bowdoin.edu/watson-arena

Sidney J. Watson Arena, or simply Watson Arena, is an ice hockey arena on the campus of Bowdoin College in Brunswick, Maine. Watson Arena seats 1,900 plus additional standing room. The arena opened on January 18, 2009, and is home to the Bowdoin Polar Bears men's and women's ice hockey teams. The arena is named for former Athletic Director Sid Watson.

Watson Arena was the first newly constructed ice arena built in the United States to earn LEED certification.

== History ==
Watson Arena replaced Dayton Arena, which had served as the home of Bowdoin ice hockey since 1956. On January 18, 2009, the women's ice hockey team tied Hamilton College 1–1 in the first game at Watson Arena.
