= Amoskeag Rugby Club =

US rugby union club, based in Manchester, NH

(United States) Amoskeag RFC
- Full name: Amoskeag Rugby Football Club
- Union: New England Rugby Football Union
- Founded: 1984; 42 years ago
- Ground(s): Northeast Athletic Club; Pembroke, New Hampshire
- President: (United States) Don Dumais
- Coach: (South Africa) Garry Cornelius
| 1st kit | 2nd kit |

Official website
- www.amoskeagrugby.com

The Amoskeag Rugby Football Club is a rugby club in Manchester, New Hampshire. They play in Division I of the New England Rugby Football Union (NERFU).

Founded in 1984, they play at the Northeast Athletic Club in Pembroke, New Hampshire. The club's colors are red and black.

== History ==
The Amoskeag Rugby Club was formed in 1984 by members of the Concord Rugby Club. Based in Manchester, New Hampshire, the club draws members from throughout central and southern New Hampshire and northern Massachusetts.

Amoskeag started play in the Third Division of the New England Rugby Football Union (NERFU). After capturing the Third Division championship several times, the club moved into the Second Division and captured the division championship in both the spring and fall of 1990 and the spring of 1991.

In addition to capturing the New England Division Championship in 1990, Amoskeag went on to win the United States Rugby East Territory's Northeastern and East Coast Second Division titles.

In the fall of 1991, Amoskeag moved into the NERFU's First Division, considered by many to be one of the most competitive in the nation. Initially the club competed against the perennial power clubs like Boston and Mystic River; by the fall of 1993, the club moved itself into the fifth position in the eight-team league. In the fall of 1994, NERFU formed the Premier League, encompassing Clubs from throughout the northeastern United States. In the fall of 1995, Amoskeag finished third in its ten-team division with a 6–3 record.

1996 and 1997 saw Amoskeag compete in the Northeast Inland Division (a middle division between Premier and Second Division), challenging for playoff spots each season. In the fall of 1998, Amoskeag placed third in the Inland Division, and was awarded a bid to the Second Division National Tournament, where the club reached the Sweet 16 in Dallas, Texas (played in the spring of 1999).

Amoskeag now competes in the Third Division of the New England Rugby Football Union (NERFU).

== Honors ==
- 2005 – Finalist in the Premier Division of the CANAM Rugby Tournament held in Saranac Lake (the largest tournament in the Western Hemisphere)
- 2007 – Cup winner in the Premier Division of the CANAM
- 2006 – Runner-up in NERFU Division One, finishing just two points behind New Haven Old Black RFC
- 2014 – Third in NERFU Division II ranking
- 2014 – Third in the NERFU Championship Tournament
- 2019- First in NERFU Division III
