= Portland Rugby Football Club (Maine) =

Portland RFC
- Full name: Portland Rugby Football Club
- Union: USA Rugby
- Founded: 1969
- Location: Portland, Maine
- Ground: Fox Field
- President: James H. Canon
- Coach: Tom Lovering
- Captain(s): Gareth Roberts, Andy Reichl
- League: New England Rugby Football Union
1st kit	2nd kit

Official website
- portlandrfc.com

Portland Rugby Football Club is one of the oldest rugby clubs in the state of Maine, having been founded in 1969 along with the Bowdoin Rugby Football Club. Since its foundation, the team has been playing in a Division II men's league (apart from several stints in Division I), which is attributed to the New England Rugby Football Union.

== History ==
Originally, the club began in Brunswick, Maine, approximately 25 miles north of Portland. Bowdoin College offered both new players as well as facilities. The team had access to athletic facilities, locker rooms, a playing field, and a practice field. The nearby Brunswick Naval Air Station provided players who had rugby backgrounds. In this scenario, the club began to grow, attracting more players. While the club drew interest to surrounding Brunswick residents, players from Portland began joining the team. As more and more Portland players joined the team, it became increasingly difficult for the Portland players, who made the majority of the team, to travel to and from Brunswick nearly four times a week. In 1974, plans were drawn up and the club was moved to Portland, while the Bowdoin Rugby Football Club stayed in Brunswick.

While playing fields were a little bit more difficult to acquire, local restaurants and bars in Portland's Oldport offered exciting postgame festivities, of which both the club and the opposing club were able to enjoy together. With the move, the team accepted even more new members and found many loyal fans. In 1979, the team won its first Division I championship in the New England Rugby Football Union. The club has also gone international, touring Ireland in 1978, 1982, 1989 and 1994, and England and Wales in 1985. In 1996 a former player, founded the Portland Youth Rugby Club, teaching the sport to high school students in the surrounding areas.

In 2019, the club celebrated its 50th anniversary by releasing a yearbook and going on an anniversary tour in Ireland, where they played two matches against Sligo RFC and Portadown RFC. The 50th anniversary banquet was subsequently cancelled due to the COVID-19 pandemic. A rescheduled 50th Anniversary Banquet is scheduled for September 18, 2021.
