= Northeastern University Rugby Club =

US rugby union club, based in Brookline, MA

Northeastern Rugby Club
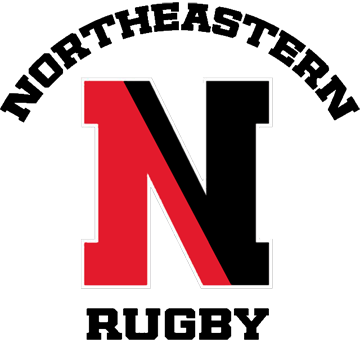
- Full name: Northeastern University Rugby Football Club
- Union: Liberty Rugby Conference
- Nickname: Maddogs
- Founded: 1984
- Ground(s): Parsons Field; Brookline, Massachusetts (Capacity: 4,000)
- Coach(es): Edward Tubridy, Alex Miccio, Bob Carroll
- League: Collegiate Division 1-A Rugby
Team kit	2nd kit	3rd kit

Official website
- nurugby.sites.northeastern.edu

The Northeastern University Rugby Football Club (or NURFC or Maddogs) is a college rugby union team representing Northeastern University. The club competes in the Liberty Conference of Division 1-A Rugby and is governed by USA Rugby.

The Northeastern Maddogs has approximately 70 members from all over the United States, and from countries all over the world, including South Africa, Ireland, the United Kingdom, Australia, France, China and Japan. The Maddogs field a competitive team every year, and have been nationally ranked.

== History ==
=== Founding ===
The club was founded by a Northeastern University student and rugby enthusiast named Bob Hubbard in 1984. He, along with 14 other students were the first team ever fielded by the Northeastern University Rugby Club. This first incarnation was not affiliated with Northeastern University, its only connection to the school was its players being students. The team's practices were held on a small triangle of dirt on Huntington Avenue across from the Boston Museum of Fine Arts, which is now the Wentworth Institute of Technology athletic complex.

In 1985, the club became more organized as another key leader named Tony Kalaijakis emerged. Kalaijakis turned the rag-tag group into a team, under him the club drafted a constitution and elected leaders yearly. The team lobbied for school recognition, hoping to become an official Northeastern club, but was denied. Disappointed by the university's decision, but wishing to maintain a connection with the school, the team chose as its mascot, the MadDog; instead of the traditional mascot of Northeastern University, the Husky.

=== NERFU (1987-2010) ===
In spring of 1987, aided by Northeastern University Professor Peter Eastman, the team became an official club of Northeastern. The club then hired its first coach, Jay Dacey of the Mystic River Rugby Club. Competing in its first Beast of the East Tournament, the Maddogs went undefeated and won the 1987 tournament. The following fall the Maddogs joined NERFU Division I and made the play-offs in their inaugural year.

The NURFC competed in New England Rugby Football Union College Division I from 1987 to 2010, playing against teams such as Army and Boston College. Dartmouth, Harvard, and Yale competed in NERFU until fall 2009, leaving to join the new Ivy League Conference. In the years since its creation, Northeastern Rugby often competed in the Beast of the East rugby tournament, winning it multiple times in recent years including in 2005 with a 21-0 win over Buffalo in the tournament final.

=== ECRC (2011-2016) ===
In 2011 Northeastern along with Boston College, UMass Amherst, University of Connecticut, Middlebury College, UAlbany, and Southern Connecticut State University joined to form the East Coast Rugby Conference. In their inaugural season, Northeastern went undefeated scoring an average of 37 points and allowing an average of 4 points per game. Their undefeated season led them to the National Championship Round of 16, where they lost to Stony Brook University 24-22. Northeastern's fall 2012 season resulted in a 5-2 record, with losses to Boston College and Middlebury, to finish 3rd in the conference.

Northeastern, as the winner of the 2012 ECRC Sevens Tournament, qualified for the USA Rugby Sevens Collegiate National Championships, in College Station, Texas. Assigned to Pool A with Life University, Colorado State, and Wisconsin, Northeastern went 2-1 with their only loss coming from the reigning champion Life University, to advance to the bowl bracket. Northeastern was eventually knocked out of the tournament by Cal Poly. After their strong showing at the National Sevens Championships, Northeastern received an invitation to the 2013 Collegiate Rugby Championship tournament at PPL Park in Philadelphia, broadcast live on NBC. Northeastern finished as winners of the bowl in their first appearance at the CRC's. In 2014, Northeastern finished as a runner up for the plate at the CRC's which represented an improvement on the year prior.

After 2014 the club lost many of its talented players and went into a rebuilding stage. Head coach Edward Tubridy was hired to lead the maddogs. In 2016, the maddogs accepted an invitation to play in the Las Vegas Invitational rugby sevens tournament. The Maddogs played against teams from across the country and posted a 2-3 record on the week. In the year following they returned to Las Vegas and posted a 3-2 record beating Wheeling Jesuit University, Utah Valley University and Montana State University. After this tournament the Maddogs continued to build in confidence and reached the final of the Armory Sevens at American International College beating University of New Hampshire, University of Connecticut and University of Massachusetts Amherst. They missed out on a bid to the USA Rugby Sevens Collegiate National Championships by losing to American International College in the final. Northeastern finished the season 21-7-3.

=== Liberty Conference (2017-present) ===
In 2017, Northeastern were invited to join the Liberty Conference; a new competitive league of Division 1-A Rugby teams. The conference includes 18 different Universities from Massachusetts, Rhode Island, Connecticut, New York, New Jersey and Delaware. The conference itself has 3 sub-conference divisions; Empire, New England and I-95. Northeastern compete in the New England division against University of Massachusetts Amherst, University of Connecticut, Tufts University, University of Rhode Island and Fairfield University. Northeastern stepped up and produced one of their best records in program history. The Maddogs finished 5-0 in conference play winning the Liberty Conference New England Division. Outside of conference play, Northeastern beat Boston College by 3 points in a very close match and came out on top against the University of New Hampshire by 61 points. To end the season, Northeastern faced SUNY Cortland in the Liberty Conference Challenge. SUNY Cortland had just won the Liberty Empire division and proved to be a tough opponent to the Maddogs. However, Northeastern had an impressive performance which saw them win the game by 32 points. The Maddogs took home the bowl trophy to cap off an impressive season which saw them finish with a record of 8-0 and a national ranking of 32.

== Season-by-season records ==
=== Past seasons ===
Year	Conference	Div	GP	W	L	D	PF	PA	PD	Conf Ranking	2018 - 2019	D1A	Liberty New England	8	6	2	0	231	104	94	3
2017-2018	Liberty New England	D1-A	8	8	0	0	350	104	246	1											
2016-2017	ECRC	D1-AA	8	6	2	0	133	195	-62	2											
2015-2016	ECRC	D1-AA	8	4	4	0	194	297	-103	4											
2014-2015	ECRC	D1-AA	7	1	6	0	72	198	-126	6											
2013-2014	ECRC	D1-AA	6	3	3	0	150	142	8	4											
2012-2013	ECRC	D1-AA	7	5	2	0	211	121	90	3											
2011-2012	ECRC	D1-AA	6	6	0	0	226	27	199	1											
2010-2011	NERFU	D1	6	5	1	0	151	106	45	1											
2009-2010	NERFU	D1	-	-	-	-	-	-	-	-											
2008-2009	NERFU	D1	7	0	7	0	-	-	-	-											
2007-2008	NERFU	D1	-	-	-	-	-	-	-	-											
2006-2007	NERFU	D1	7	4	3	0	215	118	97	-											
2005-2006	NERFU	D1	7	3	4	0	120	142	-22	-											
2004-2005	NERFU	D1	7	4	3	0	121	124	-3	-											
2003-2004	NERFU	D1	7	6	1	0	161	110	51	-											
1989-1990	NERFU	D1	5	5	0	0	89	46	43	2											

== Team accomplishments ==
=== Divisional championships ===
- New England Rugby Football Union D1 Champions (2011)
- East Coast Rugby Conference Champions (2012)
- Liberty Conference New England Champions (2017)
- Liberty Conference Champions (2017)
- Liberty Conference Champions (2019)

=== Tournament championships ===
- Beast of the East Rugby Tournament (1987, 1995, 2005, 2007 (runner up), 2010)
- ECRC Sevens Tournament (2012)
- Collegiate Rugby Championships (2013 (Bowl), 2014 (10th))
- Cianci Sevens Tournament Champions (2012, 2013, 2014, 2015)

== Individual player accomplishments ==
=== Collegiate All-Americans ===
Player name	Class	7s or XVs	Year	Team	Reference
Dimitri Efthimiou	2012	7s	2013	Honorable Mention	
Chris Frazier	2014	7s	2014	1st Team	
Sean McElhinney	2019	15s	2017	1st team all D1A	

=== All-Conference / Regional selections ===
Player name	Class	Conference	Year(s)	Team(s)	Reference
Nino Balduzzi	2001	NRU	1997, 1998, 1999, 2000	First Team XVs	
Mike Bruce	2011	NERFU	2010	First Team XVs	
Tom Budravich	1989	NERFU	1988	First Team XVs	
George Chacharone	2004	NRU	2004	First Team XVs	
Paul Coste	2016	ECRC	2014	Second Team XVs	
Ryan Crowe	2018	Liberty Conference	2017	Liberty Conference All Stars	
Tim Cummings	1990	NERFU	1989	First Team XVs	
Gil Danaher	-	NRU	2004	First Team XVs	
Chris Frazier	2014	ECRC	2013, 2014	First Team XVs, First Team 7s	
Josiah Herbert	2005	NRU	2004	First Team XVs	
Franco Liebenburg	2016	ECRC	2014	Second Team 7s	
Rudy Machacek	1989	NERFU	1988	First Team XVs	
Diego Maquieira	2014	ECRC	2013, 2014	First Team XVs, First Team 7s	
Bob McCarthy	1989	NERFU	1988	First Team XVs	
Dave McDermott	-	NRU	2005	First Team XVs	
Greg McInerney	2013	ECRC	2013	First Team XVs	
Mark Phillips	1989	NERFU	1988	First Team XVs	
Aaron Reich	2014	ECRC	2014	Second Team 7s	
Mike Schoelch	2007	NRU	2005	First Team XVs	
Scott Sivak	2004	NRU	2004	First Team XVs	
Nick Smit	2011	NERFU	2010	First Team XV	
Aaron Smith	2015	ECRC	2014	Second Team 7s	
Michael Strouch	1990	NERFU	1989	First Team XVs	
Ty Taylor	2013	ECRC	2013	First Team XVs	
Alex Throssel	2011	NERFU	2010	First Team XVs	
David Tobias	2013	ECRC	2013	First Team XVs	
Sebastien Voigt	2013	ECRC	2013	First Team XVs	
Luke Wallin	2006	NRU	2005	First Team XVs	

== Professional Representation ==
Player name	Class	Club	Position	Caps	Debut	League	Reference
Diego Maquieira	2014	Houston SaberCats	Hooker	1	01/06/18	Major League Rugby	

== National representation ==
Player name	Class	Country	Caps	Debut	Date	Reference
Dimitri Efthimiou	2012	United States (7s)	1*	2010–11 IRB Sevens World Series	21 January 2010	
Mikhael Shammas	2009	Lebanon (Rugby League)	2	Lebanon v British Armed Forces XIIIs	3 July 2006	
Kyle Winter	1999	Indonesia	3	Indonesia v Guam	1 July 2009	

(*) denotes tournament appearances
