= 2010 NERFU college men's Division III rugby tournament =

The 2010 NERFU college men's Division III rugby tournament featured the top eight Division III college rugby teams out of 32 competitors from the four NERFU sub-conferences (North, South, Central, West). The top two teams from each conference were seeded according to the success of their conference in the 2009 Tournament.

In the cup championship match at the Harrington Memorial Pitch at Babson College in Wellesley, Massachusetts, Salve Regina University defeated Springfield College by a score of 53–21. The match was attended by over 300 fans.

With its victory, Salve Regina University earned an automatic bid to represent the New England region in the Small College National Championship Final Four sponsored by the National Small College Rugby Organization. This year, the NSCRO Champions Cup will be held at the Virginia Beach Sportsplex in Virginia Beach, VA on April 30 - May 1, 2011.

NERFU also sponsored a lower tier Plate Championship for teams seeded 3 & 4 in their subconferences. In that tournament, Plymouth State University defeated UMass Lowell 22–14.

== Cup championship bracket ==
Quarterfinals
Tufts University	24
Eastern Connecticut State University	17
Springfield College	26
Keene State College	24
Salve Regina University	41
Bates College	5
Babson College	25
Providence College	31

Semifinals
Springfield College	31
Tufts	27
Salve Regina University	31
Providence College	13

Championship
November 14 – Wellesley, Massachusetts
Springfield College	21
Salve Regina University	53
