= New England Rugby Football Union =

Organization of rugby teams

- Abbreviation: NERFU
- Formation: February 3, 1975; 51 years ago
- Legal status: Association
- Headquarters: Boston, Massachusetts
- Region served: New England, United States of America
- Members: Approximately 3000 athletes on 80 teams (collegiate and senior)
- President: Brad Dufresne
- Main organ: Executive Committee
- Website: nerfu.rugby

The New England Rugby Football Union (NERFU) is a Geographical Union (GU) for rugby union teams in New England.

Prior to 2013, NERFU had been a local area union ("LAU"), and part of the Northeast Rugby Union (NRU), which is the governing body for three LAU's (New York State Rugby Football Conference (NYSRFC) and Metropolitan New York Rugby Union being the others).

There are currently over 80 active teams and over 3,000 registered players in the New England area.

== Mission ==
The mission of the New England Rugby Football Union is to manage, serve, and promote the game of rugby in the New England area, at all levels of play; to assist member teams and participants in their various forms of involvement with the game; to adhere to all the laws of the game; and to encourage and facilitate the involvement of as many people as possible in rugby activities. NERFU focuses the majority of its attention on serving rugby at the club level, and less on the collegiate and HS levels.

== Divisions ==
=== Men's ===
==== Club ====
===== Division I =====
- Mystic River Rugby Club

===== Division II =====
- Boston Irish Wolfhounds RFC
- Boston RFC
- Hartford Wanderers RFC
- Mystic Barbarians RFC
- New London, Coast Guard Academy RFC
- Newport RFC
- Portland RFC
- Worcester RFC
- South Shore Anchors RFC

===== Division III =====
- Albany RFC
- Amoskeag RFC
- Boston Irish Wolfhounds RFC 2nd XV
- Boston Maccabi RFC
- Burlington RFC
- Charles River Rats RFC
- MIT RFC
- New London County RFC
- North Shore RFC
- Old Gold RFC
- Providence RFC

===== Division IV =====
- Black River RFC
- Boston Ironsides RFC
- Cape Cod RFC
- Mad River/Stowe RFC
- Monadnock RFC
- Springfield RFC
- Seacoast Men's RFC
- Upper Valley RFC
- South Shore RFC 2nd XV

==== Collegiate ====
===== Division I =====
NERFU's Division I program lost multiple rugby programs when the ivy league colleges left to form the Ivy League Rugby Conference (Harvard, Yale, Dartmouth).
- Boston College (see BCRFC)
- Middlebury College
- Northeastern University (see NURFC)
- Southern Connecticut State University
- University of Albany
- University of Connecticut
- University of Massachusetts Amherst

===== Division II =====
- Boston University
- College of the Holy Cross
- Norwich University
- University of New Hampshire
- University of Maine, Orono
- University of Rhode Island
- University of Vermont

===== Division III =====
====== Maine Conference ======
- Bates College
- Bowdoin College
- Colby College
- Maine Maritime Academy
- University of Maine at Farmington
- University of Maine at Orono

====== Boston Conference ======
- Babson College
- Curry College
- Tufts University
- Wentworth Institute of Technology
- Worcester Polytechnic Institute

====== Central Conference ======
- Bryant University
- Johnson and Wales University
- Massachusetts Maritime Academy
- Roger Williams College
- Salve Regina University
- Wheaton College
- University of Massachusetts Dartmouth

====== Western Conference ======
- Amherst College
- Castleton University
- Franklin Pierce University
- Keene State College
- Plymouth State College
- Williams College

====== Southern Conference ======
- Brandeis University
- Central Connecticut State University
- Eastern Connecticut State University
- New Haven U23
- Springfield College
- Trinity College
- University of Hartford
- Western Connecticut State University
- Western New England College

===== Division IV =====
====== Central Conference ======
- Connecticut College
- Massachusetts College of Liberal Arts
- Nichols College
- Southern Vermont College
- Wesleyan University
- Westfield State University

====== South Conference ======
- Framingham State College
- Lasell College
- Mitchell College
- Rhode Island College
- University of New England

====== North Conference ======
- Champlain College
- Colby-Sawyer College
- Green Mountain College
- Johnson State College
- Lyndon State College
- Maine Maritime Academy

==== U19 ====
NERFU has essentially abdicated its role in overseeing U-19/HS Rugby in favor of state based rugby organizations (SRBOs). In New England, there are nascent SRBOs in VT, CT and MA.

===== Division I =====
- Amoskeag RFC U19 Squad
- Bishop Hendricken High School
- Belmont High School (MA)
- Brookline High School
- Boston College High School
- Lincoln-Sudbury High School
- Scituate Stormers Rugby
- St. John's Preparatory School
- Middlesex RFC U19 Squad
- Xaverian Brothers High School

===== Division II =====
- Arlington Catholic High School
- Catholic Memorial High School
- Cheshire Rams
- Essex High School
- Fairfield High School
- Falmouth High School
- Groton School
- Kearsarge Regional High School
- Kimball Union Academy
- Mad River Valley Boys
- Marshfield High School
- Malden Catholic High School
- Middlesex Youth RFC
- Needham High School Men's Rugby Club
- North Country RFC U19 Squad
- North Quincy High School Rugby Football Club
- Phillips Exeter Academy
- Portland RFC U19 Squad
- Rutland RFC U19 Squad
- Springfield RFC
- Stanstead College
- Staples High School
- Upper Valley Youth RFC
- Winged Beavers

==== Massachusetts Youth Rugby Organization (MYRO) ====
The Massachusetts SBRO (http://myrugby.org) is now the umbrella organization for youth rugby in the state. All High School, U19, and U15 clubs are now under their auspices.

Boston middle schools that play rugby include Washington Irving, Edwards, Orchard Gardens, and Lee Academy.

=== Women's ===
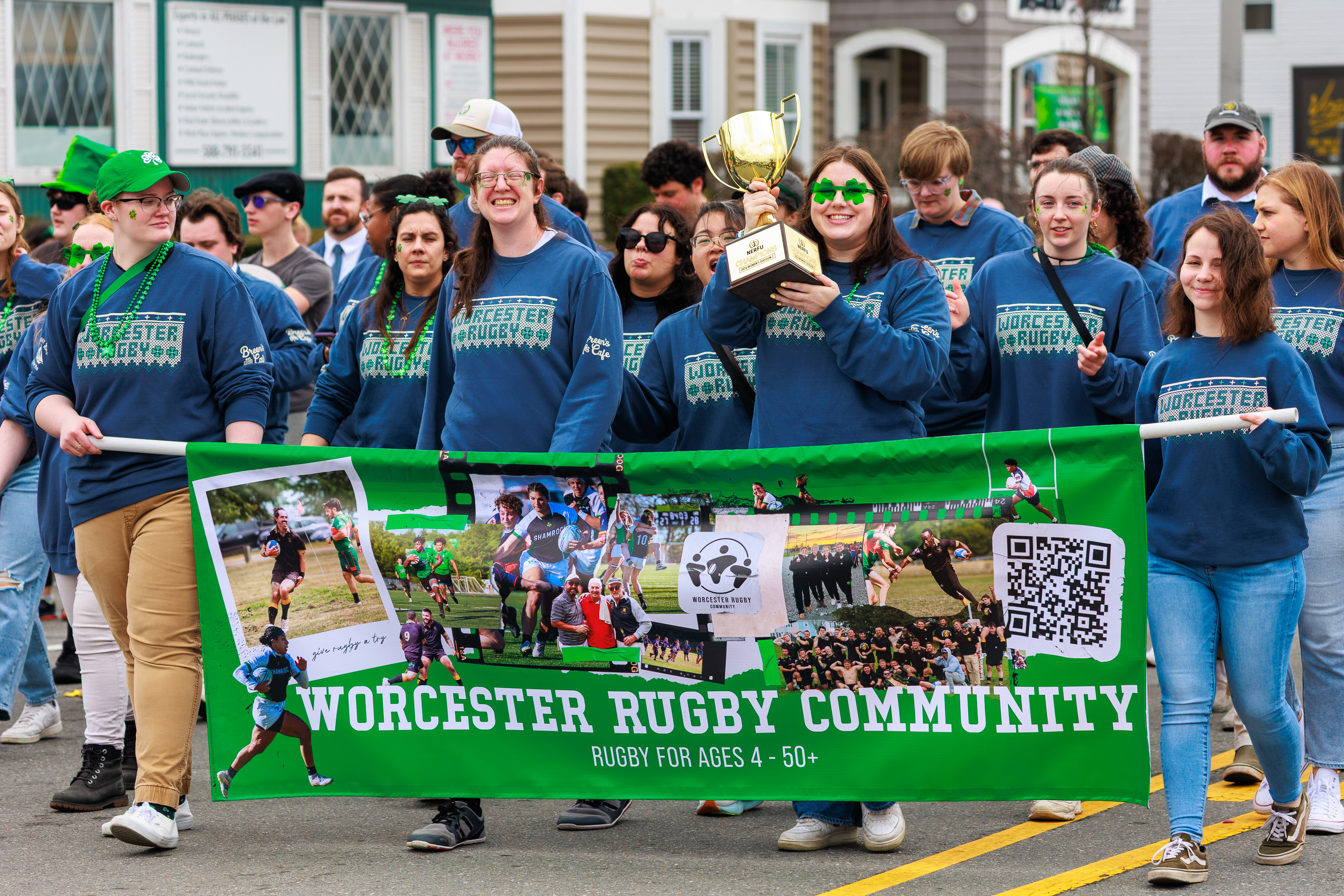
Worcester Shamrocks Rugby Club won the NERFU Women's Championship in 2024

==== Club ====
===== Division I =====
- Boston Women RFC
- Beantown

===== Division II =====
- Albany, New York WRFC
- Burlington WRFC
- Charles River WRFC
- Hartford Wild Roses
- Providence, Rhode Island WRFC
- Worcester WRFC

===== Division III =====
- Amoskeag WRFC
- North Shore WRFC
- Portland WRFC
- Seacoast WRFC
- South Shore WRFC
- Upper Valley WRFC

==== Collegiate ====
===== Division I =====
====== Eastern Conference ======
- Boston College
- Brown University
- Boston University
- Northeastern University
- Radcliffe College
- Providence College

====== Western Conference ======
- Amherst College
- Dartmouth College
- University of Massachusetts Amherst
- University of Connecticut
- Williams College
- Yale University

===== Division II =====
====== Downeast Conference ======
- Bates College
- Bowdoin College (Bowdoin College Men's Rugby)
- Colby College
- University of Maine at Farmington
- University of Maine, Orono
- University of New Hampshire

====== East Conference ======
- Babson College
- Wesleyan University
- Smith College
- Tufts University
- University of Rhode Island
- Wellesley College
- Worcester Polytechnic Institute

====== West Conference ======
- Castleton State College
- Keene State College
- Middlebury College
- Norwich University
- Plymouth State College
- University of Vermont

===== Division III =====
====== East Conference ======
- Bentley College
- Brandeis University
- Bridgewater State College
- MIT
- Stonehill College
- Wheaton College

====== South Conference ======
- US Coast Guard Academy
- Central Connecticut State University
- Rhode Island College
- Roger Williams University
- Trinity College
- University of Hartford
- Western Connecticut State University

====== West Conference ======
- Colby-Sawyer College
- Framingham State College
- Johnson State College
- Mount Holyoke College
- Saint Michael's College
- University of Massachusetts Lowell

===== Division IV =====
====== East Conference ======
- College of the Holy Cross
- Saint Anselm College
- University of Massachusetts Dartmouth
- Wentworth Institute of Technology

====== West Conference ======
- Connecticut College
- Green Mountain College
- Lyndon State College
- Nichols College
- Southern Vermont College
- Springfield College
- Western New England College

==== U19 ====
===== Division I =====
- Colchester High School
- Essex High School
- Marshfield High School
- Newport High School
- Needham High School Women's Rugby Club
- Phillips Exeter Academy
- Portland RFC U19 Girls
- Rutland RFC U19 Girls
- South Burlington High School
- Sugar River Girls
- Upper Valley Youth
- Newton South High School Girls Rugby Club

== Championships ==
1997
Men's Club D1 -
Men's Club D2 -
Men's Club D3 -
Women's Club D1 -
Women's Club D2 -
Women's Club D3 -
Men's College D1 -
Men's College D2 -
Men's College D3 - University of Massachusetts Lowell
Women's College D1 -
Women's College D2 -
Women's College D3 -

1998
Men's Club D1 -
Men's Club D2 -
Men's Club D3 -
Women's Club D1 -
Women's Club D2 -
Women's Club D3 -
Men's College D1 -
Men's College D2 -
Men's College D3 - University of Massachusetts Lowell
Women's College D1 -
Women's College D2 -
Women's College D3 -

1999
Men's Club D1 -
Men's Club D2 -
Men's Club D3 -
Women's Club D1 -
Women's Club D2 -
Women's Club D3 -
Men's College D1 - Norwich University
Men's College D2 -
Men's College D3 -
Women's College D1 -
Women's College D2 -
Women's College D3 -

2000
Men's Club D1 -
Men's Club D2 -
Men's Club D3 - New England College All Black's

Women's Club D1 -
Women's Club D2 -
Women's Club D3 -
Men's College D1 -
Men's College D2 -
Men's College D3 -
Women's College D1 -
Women's College D2 -
Women's College D3 -

2001
Men's Club D1 -
Men's Club D2 -
Men's Club D3 -
Women's Club D1 -
Women's Club D2 -
Women's Club D3 -
Men's College D1 -
Men's College D2 -
Men's College D3 - Tufts University
Men's College D4 - Bentley University
Women's College D1 -
Women's College D2 -
Women's College D3 -

2002
Men's Club D1 -
Men's Club D2 -
Men's Club D3 -
Women's Club D1 -
Women's Club D2 -
Women's Club D3 -
Men's College D1 -
Men's College D2 -
Men's College D3 -
Men's College D4 - Brandeis University
Women's College D1 -
Women's College D2 -
Women's College D3 -

2003
Men's Club D1 - Boston Irish Wolfhounds
Men's Club D2 -
Men's Club D3 -
Women's Club D1 -
Women's Club D2 -
Women's Club D3 -
Men's College D1 -
Men's College D2 -
Men's College D3 -
Men's College D4 - Wheaton College
Women's College D1 -
Women's College D2 -
Women's College D3 -

2004
Men's Club D1 - Boston Irish Wolfhounds
Men's Club D2 -
Men's Club D3 -
Women's Club D1 -
Women's Club D2 -
Women's Club D3 -
Men's College D1 -
Men's College D2 -
Men's College D3 -
Men's College D4 - Maine Maritime Academy
Women's College D1 -
Women's College D2 -
Women's College D3 -

2005
Men's Club D1 - Boston Irish Wolfhounds
Men's Club D2 -
Men's Club D3 -
Women's Club D1 -
Women's Club D2 -
Women's Club D3 -
Men's College D1 -
Men's College D2 -
Men's College D3 - Bentley University
Men's College D4 - Saint Anselm College
Women's College D1 -
Women's College D2 -
Women's College D3 -

2006
Men's Club D1 -
Men's Club D2 -
Men's Club D3 -
Women's Club D1 -
Women's Club D2 -
Women's Club D3 -
Men's College D1 -
Men's College D2 - United States Coast Guard Academy
Men's College D3 - Bentley University
Men's College D4 - Nichols College
Women's College D1 -
Women's College D2 -
Women's College D3 -
Women's College D4 -

2007
Men's Club D1 -
Men's Club D2
Men's Club D3
Women's Club D1
Women's Club D2
Women's Club D3
Men's College D1
Men's College D2 - Middlebury College
Men's College D3 - Plymouth State University
Men's College D4 - University of Massachusetts Dartmouth See: 2007 NERFU College Men's Division IV Rugby Tournament
Women's College D1 -
Women's College D2 -
Women's College D3 -
Women's College D4 -

2008
Men's Club D1 - Boston Irish Wolfhounds
Men's Club D2
Men's Club D3
Women's Club D1
Women's Club D2
Women's Club D3
Men's College D1
Men's College D2 - Middlebury College
Men's College D3 - Salve Regina University See: 2008 NERFU College Men's Division III Rugby Tournament
Men's College D4 - Holy Cross College
Women's College D1 - United States Military Academy
Women's College D2 - Stonehill College
Women's College D3 - Bryant University
Women's College D4 - Holy Cross College

2009
Men's Club D1
Men's Club D2
Men's Club D3
Men's Club D4 - Saratoga Springs Stampede
Women's Club D1
Women's Club D2
Women's Club D3
Men's College D1
Men's College D2 - UMASS Amherst
Men's College D3 -
Men's College D4 -
Women's College D1 -
Women's College D2 -
Women's College D3 -Massachusetts Institute of Technology
Women's College D4 -

2010
Men's Club D1
Men's Club D2
Men's Club D3 - Saratoga Springs Stampede
Men's Club D4
Women's Club D1
Women's Club D2
Women's Club D3
Men's College D1
Men's College D2
Men's College D3 - Salve Regina University See 2010 NERFU College Men's Division III Rugby Tournament
Men's College D4 -
Women's College D1 -
Women's College D2 -
Women's College D3 -
Women's College D4 -

2016
Men's Club D1
Men's Club D2
Men's Club D3
Men's Club D4
Women's Club D1
Women's Club D2
Women's Club D3
Men's College D1
Men's College D2
Men's College D3 - University of Maine at Orono
Men's College D4
Women's College D1
Women's College D2
Women's College D3
Women's College D4 -

2023
Men's Club D1
Men's Club D2
Men's Club D3
Men's Club D4 - Seacoast RFC
Women's Club D1
Women's Club D2
Women's Club D3
Men's College D1
Men's College D2
Men's College D3
Men's College D4
Women's College D1
Women's College D2
Women's College D3
Women's College D4 -
