= Bowdoin Polar Bears =

Athletic teams of Bowdoin College

- University: Bowdoin College
- Nickname: Polar Bears
- NCAA: Division III
- Conference: New England Small College Athletic Conference (primary); NEISA (sailing); EISA (Nordic skiing)
- Athletic director: Tim Ryan
- Location: Brunswick, Maine
- Varsity teams: 30
- Football stadium: Whittier Field
- Basketball arena: Morrell Gymnasium
- Ice hockey arena: Sidney J. Watson Arena
- Baseball stadium: Pickard Field
- Other venues: Leighton Sailing Center; Brunswick Golf Course; Howard F. Ryan Field; LeRoy Greason Pool; William Farley Field House
- Colors: Black and white
- Mascot: Peary the Polar Bear
- Website: athletics.bowdoin.edu
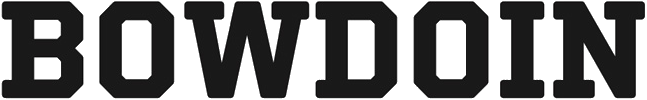

The Bowdoin Polar Bears are the intercollegiate athletic teams that represent Bowdoin College, located in Brunswick, Maine. The Polar Bears compete in the National Collegiate Athletic Association (NCAA) and New England Small College Athletic Conference (NESCAC). Bowdoin College currently fields teams in fourteen men's sports and sixteen women's sports. The polar bear team name was selected to honor Robert Peary of the class of 1877 who led the first expedition that reached the North Pole.

All Bowdoin Polar Bears sports teams compete in NCAA Division III, and 25 of 30 teams compete in the NESCAC. Bowdoin College was one of the eleven charter members who joined to form the new New England Small College Athletic Conference in 1971.

Most Bowdoin Polar Bears teams have on-campus facilities, and most are located on the south side of campus, including Sidney J. Watson Arena for ice hockey; Howard F. Ryan Field for field hockey and lacrosse; Pickard Field for baseball, soccer, softball, and rugby; Lubin Family Squash Center for squash; LeRoy Greason Pool for swimming and diving; and Farley Field House for indoor track and field. Whittier Field is located on the east side of campus. Morrell Gymnasium is located at the center of campus. Brunswick Golf Course, Leighton Sailing Center, and Pineland Nordic Skiing Center are all located away from the main campus.

Tim Ryan has been the athletic director since 2013.

The Athletic Department also supports three club sports: rowing, rugby, and ultimate Frisbee.

== Sports sponsored ==
The Bowdoin College Athletic Department sponsors teams in 14 men's and 16 women's NCAA sanctioned sports.

Men's sports	Women's sports
Baseball	Basketball
Basketball	Cross country
Cross country	Field hockey
Football	Golf
Golf	Ice hockey
Ice hockey	Lacrosse
Lacrosse	Nordic skiing
Nordic skiing	Rowing (club)
Rowing (Club)	Rugby
Rugby (club)	Sailing
Sailing	Soccer
Soccer	Softball
Squash	Squash
Swimming and diving	Swimming and diving
Tennis	Tennis
Track and field^{1}	Track and field^{1}
	Volleyball
^{1} – Track and field includes both indoor and outdoor.

=== Baseball ===
Bowdoin College first fielded a varsity baseball team in 1867. Seven Bowdoin College alumnus have played in Major League Baseball. Since 1966, four players have been selected in the Major League Baseball draft.

The Polar Bears have advanced to two NCAA tournaments in 2006 and 2012.

The Polar Bears baseball team plays its home games at Pickard Baseball Diamond. Mike Connolly is the current head coach of the Bowdoin Polar Bears baseball.

=== Women's basketball ===
The women's basketball team at Bowdoin College has won nine NESCAC championships, including seven in a row from 2001 to 2007. The Polar Bears have historically been competitive in the NCAA tournament.

=== Field hockey ===
The field hockey team at Bowdoin College has won 11 conference championships (8 since competing in the NESCAC) and 4 national championships.

=== Football ===
Bowdoin College fielded an official varsity football team for the first time in 1899, losing to Tufts 8–4 in its first game. Bowdoin football achieved its first win in the following game in a 42–0 win over the Boston Latin School.

The Polar Bears' most prominent current football rivals are in-state NESCAC foes Bates and Colby. Bowdoin has historically shared rivalries with Maine, too, but those games are no longer played annually and have lessened in intensity. Since 1965, Bowdoin, Bates, and Colby compete annually in the Colby-Bates-Bowdoin Championship to be the best NESCAC school in Maine; Bowdoin has won the CBB championship 20 times, the most of all three schools. Prior to the CBB Championship, the three schools competed with Maine for the State Championship. Bowdoin won the State Championship nine times. The State Championship seasons were: 1935, 1936, 1937, 1940, 1942, 1949, 1952, 1960 and 1963.

The Polar Bears football team plays its home games at Whittier Field, the team's home field since the program began. B. J. Hammer is the current head coach of the Bowdoin Polar Bears football.

== Facilities ==
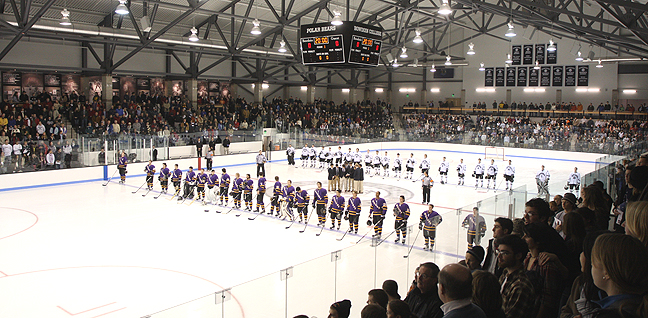
Sidney J. Watson Arena during an ice hockey game in 2011

Venue	Sport	Capacity	Opened
Brunswick Golf Course	Golf	N/A	1888
Sidney J. Watson Arena	Ice hockey	1,900	2009
Howard F. Ryan Field	Field Hockey, Lacrosse (women's)	N/A	2001
Leighton Sailing Center	Sailing	N/A	2014
LeRoy Greason Pool	Swimming and diving	350	N/A
Lubin Family Squash Center	Squash	N/A	N/A
Magee-Samuelson Track	Outdoor track and field	9,000	1970
Morrell Gymnasium	Basketball; Volleyball	1,500	1965
Pickard Baseball Diamond	Baseball	N/A	N/A
Pickard Cross Country Course	Cross country	N/A	N/A
Pickard Men's Soccer Field	Soccer	2,000	N/A
Pickard Rugby Field	Rugby union	N/A	N/A
Pickard Softball Field	Softball	N/A	N/A
Pickard Tennis Courts	Tennis	N/A	N/A
Pineland Nordic Skiing Center	Nordic skiing	N/A	N/A
Smith Boathouse	Rowing	N/A	2002
William Farley Field House	Indoor track & field	1,000	N/A
Whittier Field	Football; Lacrosse (men's)	9,000	1896

== Championships ==
=== NCAA team championships ===
Bowdoin has won 5 NCAA team titles.

- Men's (1)
  - Tennis (1): 2016
- Women's (4)
  - Field Hockey (4): 2007, 2008, 2010, 2013

=== Other national team championships ===
Below are national team titles that were not bestowed by the NCAA:

- Men's (3)
  - Ice Hockey (3): (Note: Bowdoin College has been named the de facto Division II champions 3 times prior to the NCAA sponsoring a Division II tournament) 1971, 1975, 1976
- Women's (4)
  - Rugby (3): 2016, 2019, 2021 (NIRA)
  - Ultimate (1): 2013 (USAU)

=== Conference championships ===
Bowdoin has won 46 conference titles. The men's ice hockey team competed in the ECAC until 1999 when the NESCAC teams formed their own conference tournament.

- Men's (16)
  - Cross Country (3): 1991, 2001, 2002
  - Ice Hockey (8): 1971, (Note: ECAC) 1975, 1976, 1978, 1986, 1993, 2013, 2014
  - Soccer (2): 2014, 2015
  - Tennis (3): 2008, 2017, 2018
- Women's (32)
  - Basketball (11): 2001, 2002, 2003, 2004, 2005, 2006, 2007, 2009, 2020, 2024, 2025
  - Cross Country (2): 1992, 1995
  - Field Hockey (11): 1976, (Note: Maine Association of Intercollegiate Athletics for Women) 1977, 1995, 2000, 2005, 2006, 2007, 2008, 2010, 2011, 2015
  - Ice Hockey (3): 2002, 2004, 2013
  - Track & Field (2): 1992, 1993
  - Volleyball (3): 2011, 2015, 2018, 2021

== Rivalries ==
The college's biggest rival is Colby College. Bates College is another big in-state conference rival. Historically, the University of Maine was a football rival during the Maine State Series era. Currently, Bowdoin, Bates, and Colby have competed for the CBB Championship since the 1960s. The college's rowing club competes in the Colby-Bates-Bowdoin Chase Regatta annually.

=== Bates ===
Bates and Bowdoin have been traditional rivals in football since they first met in 1889. As of 2021, Bowdoin and Bates have competed in 123 football games, making it the 10th longest NCAA Division III rivalry. The Polar Bears lead the Bobcats 67-49-7 all-time.

=== Colby ===
The Bowdoin–Colby football rivalry is the third oldest in Division III.

Additionally, the Bowdoin men's hockey team has a historic rivalry with Colby. The inaugural ice hockey match between the two schools occurred in 1922.

== Notable athletes ==
=== Polar Bears in the Olympic Games ===
Bowdoin College has a long history of athletes who have competed in the Olympic Games and Paralympic Games. Bowdoin has produced three gold medalists.

The list of notable Polar Bear Olympians and Paralympians includes Fred Tootell, Geoffrey Mason, Bernard Lucas, Joan Benoit Samuelson, Jake Adicoff, and Emilie Grand'Pierre.

== See also ==
- List of college athletic programs in Maine
