= Louisiana State University rugby =

US rugby union club, based in Baton Rouge, LA

Louisiana State
- Full name: Louisiana State University Rugby Football Club
- Union: USA Rugby
- Nickname: Tigers
- Founded: 1970; 56 years ago
- Location: UREC Field Complex, Baton Rouge, LA
- Region: Louisiana
- League: Southeastern
Team kit

Official website
- lsurugby.com

The Louisiana State University Rugby Football Club, often referred to as LSU Tigers Rugby, represents Louisiana State University in college rugby and rugby sevens. The team is part of the Southeastern Collegiate Rugby Conference (SCRC) and they play their home matches at the UREC Field Complex on LSU's campus.

== History ==
The LSU Rugby team dates back to 1970, founded by Rob Haswell, Jay McKenna and Hal Rose. LSU won the 1976 college rugby unofficial national tournament.

LSU Rugby became a member of the Texas Rugby Union in 1996. LSU Rugby competed at the 1998 Western Rugby Collegiate Championships, led by Head Coach Steve Triche.

In 2005, Scott McLean was named head coach of the LSU Rugby team. In the 2008-09 season, the team won the SEC rugby title in the fall, and in the spring advanced to the quarterfinals of the Division I national rugby tournament. During the 2009-2010 season, LSU went to its second consecutive Sweet 16 appearance, but lost to Penn State 31–25. LSU players Adam Ducoing, Bobby Johns, and Cody Cadella were named to the Collegiate All-American teams at the conclusion of the 2009-10 season.

LSU Rugby joined the College Premier Division (later named Division 1-A), where they played in the Mid-South conference against teams such as Texas A&M and Oklahoma. LSU competed at the 2011 Collegiate Rugby Championship, a tournament held at PPL Park in Philadelphia and broadcast on NBC. LSU finished in ninth place, winning the consolation bracket with victories over Boston College, North Carolina, and Notre Dame.

LSU Rugby joined the Southeastern Collegiate Rugby Conference in 2011. In 2012, Bob Causey was named head coach of the LSU Rugby team, following the retirement of Scott McLean. In 2012, LSU were the SCRC West Division champions and advanced to the SCRC playoffs, before losing to Florida in the SCRC semifinals. LSU flyhalf Allen Alongi led the SCRC Conference in points scored during the 2012 season.

In 2013, LSU won the West Division of the SCRC Conference, finishing with a 5–1 conference record, before losing to South Carolina in the SCRC playoffs.

LSU had a successful 2014 season, going undefeated in conference play to become the SCRC West Division champions, before losing to South Carolina in the SCRC finals. LSU secured a berth in the 2014 national D1-AA playoffs, where they faced Central Florida in the Round of 16. LSU Rugby was suspended in November 2014 due to a violation of the school's alcohol policy, but the team was reinstated in January 2015.

== Head coaches ==
Tenure	Coach	Years	Record	Pct.	Accomplishments
1970–1973	Rob Haswell	3			
1979–1983	David	5			
1984–2001	John Staub	8			
2002–2006	Steven Triche	5			
2007–2011	Scott McLean	5			Collegiate Rugby Championship, 9th place (2011)
2012–2021	Bob "Red" Causey	10			SCRC West Division champion (2012, 2013, 2014)
2022	Harry Higgins	1			
Present	Chris Riedel				

== Players and Alumni ==
Many current and former players have been selected to Regional and National Select Sides, and several LSU Tigers contributed to the victory of the Louisiana (LA) U-19 All-stars in national competition. In addition, former LSU players have been team members of the USA U-19 Eagles in international competitions and have participated in the Down Under Rugby training program in Australia.

=== U.S. national team ===
The following LSU players have been called up to play for the United States national rugby union team:

- Bob Causey (1977–1987) — 8 caps as lock, including 1 cap against South Africa (1981), 2 against England (1982) and (1987) in the World Cup.
- Boyd Morrison (1979–1980) — 2 caps as center.
- Joey Husband
- Gary Giepert (1985 -1986) Flanker 1985 U S Junior Eagle tour of Europe compiled 5 - 1 record. 1986 Junior Eagle v. Japan (full international side) Dallas, Tx.
- Cameron Falcon — played as hooker for the United States national under-20 rugby union team at the 2012 IRB Junior World Rugby Trophy.

=== All Americans ===
- Gary Giepert (1985)
- Francis Mayer (1989, 1990)
- Brian Q. Davis (1999)
- Adam Ducoing (2008)
- Cameron Falcon (2011, 2012)

=== LSU Rugby Hall of Fame ===
- Rob Haswell (2021)
- Bob Causey (2021)
- Scott McLean (2021)

== Championships ==
Year	Championship
2012	SCRC — West Division
2013	SCRC — West Division
2014	SCRC — West Division
