= Newport Rugby Football Club (Rhode Island) =

The Newport Rugby Football Club are a rugby union club based in Newport, Rhode Island, USA. Founded in 1980, the club competes in the New England Rugby Football Union Men's Club Division II.
