= Middlebury College Rugby Club =

(United States) Middlebury
- Full name: The Middlebury College Rugby Club
- Union: New England RFU
- Nickname: The Blue
- Founded: 1972; 54 years ago
- Ground: Middlebury, Vermont
- President: Cole Siefer
- Coach: Kerry Wiebe
- League: New England Rugby Football Union Small College Conference
1st kit	2nd kit

Official website
- www.themcrc.com

Middlebury College Rugby Club is the Small College rugby union team of Middlebury College, located in Middlebury, Vermont. Also known as The MCRC, the club competes in the New England Rugby Football Union.

== D II National Champions ==
On May 5, 2007, MCRC beat Arkansas State 38–22 to win the Division II National Championship for the first time in club history. MCRC won the National Championship again in 2009, beating University of Wisconsin 27-11 and finishing the season undefeated.

== Players ==
Joaqin Chica Levy Jack Maguire Phi Ngyen (B side captain) Mau Parr (DJ) Jem Wilson (Lib) Leonard Katz Abe (emperor) Grady (feb)

== Titles ==
East Coast Rugby Conference Division 1-AA Champions: 2012, 2013

National Division II Champions: 2007, 2009

NERFU Division II Champions: 2001, 2002, 2003, 2005, 2006, 2007, 2008

Northeast Territorial Division II Champions: 2001, 2002, 2008

== "The Blue" ==
"The Blue" originated in the spring of 2008 under coaches Kevin O'Brien and John Phillips. It is a recognition of players that played a minimum of 5 regular season or playoff games for the MCRC A-side. Members of The Blue are responsible for nominating the team's captains for the following season and receive their jersey upon graduation.
