= Beast of the East (rugby) =

College rugby tournament

The Beast of the East is the largest college rugby tournament in the world. Beast of the East is held in April of each year. In 2022, the tournament added sevens competitions to the schedule in response to the increase of teams playing rugby sevens in the spring season. In 2010, the 27th annual tournament, 84 college rugby teams participated in five divisions. The tournament is hosted by Providence Rugby Football Club on six rugby fields at The Glen in Portsmouth, Rhode Island.

== Past Champions ==
2018

- Women's Division 1: Vassar College def. UConn 15-12
- Women's Division 2: UAlbany def. Marist College 17-5
- Women's Division 3: University of New Haven def UMass Dartmouth 34-0
- Men's Division 1: Bishop's University def. UMass Amherst 13-10
- Men's Division 2: Plymouth State University def. Sacred Heart University 17-7
- Men's Division 3: UMaine Farmington def. UMass Dartmouth 28-5

2017

- Women's Division 1: Vassar College
- Women's Division 2: Roger Williams University
- Women's Division 3: University of Maine Orono def. University of Connecticut 17-12 (OT)
- Men's Division 1: University of Connecticut
- Men's Division 2: Salve Regina
- Men's Division 3: University of Maine Orono def. University of New Haven 24-0

2016

- Women's Division 1: University of Connecticut
- Men's Division 1: University of Massachusetts- Amherst
- Women's Division 2: Vassar College
- Men's Division 2: Roger Williams University
- Women's Division 3: Roger Williams University

2015

- Men's Division 3: University of Maine Orono def. Colby College 21-3
- Women's Division 3: Roger Williams University

2014

- Men's Division 1: University of Massachusetts Amherst def. Providence College 16-3
- Men's Division 2: University of Massachusetts Amherst B side def. Salve Regina University 12-5
- Women's Division 3: Middlebury College def. Plymouth State

2013

- Men's Division 1: University of Massachusetts Amherst def. United States Merchant Marine Academy 11-10

2012

- Men's Division 1: Iona College def.
- Men's Division 2: Sacred Heart University def. Massachusetts Maritime Academy 20-0
- Women's Division 1: Northeastern University def. Boston College

2011

- Men's Division 1: Salve Regina University def. Syracuse University 12-5
- Men's Division 2: Iona College def. Providence College
- Women's Division 1:
- Women's Division 2:
- Women's Division 3: Smith College def. College of the Holy Cross 20-0

2010

- Men's Division 1: Northeastern University def. Brown University 17-0
- Men's Division 2: Southern Connecticut State University def. Salve Regina University 21-0
- Women's Division 1: Dartmouth College def. Princeton University 10-0
- Women's Division 2: Radcliffe College def. Marist
- Women's Division 3: MIT def. College of the Holy Cross

2009

- Men's Division 1: University of Connecticut
- Men's Division 2: Providence College
- Women's Division 1: Vassar College def. Syracuse University 31-0
- Women's Division 2: Bryant University
- Women's Division 3: College of the Holy Cross

2008 - 25th Annual Tournament

- Division 1 Men: Bentley University def. URI 14-5
- Division 2 Men: Salisbury State University def. Bryant University
- Division 2 Women: Providence College def. Rutgers University
- Division 3 Women: Bryant University def. Roger Williams University

2007

- Men's Division 1: United States Merchant Marine Academy King's Point def. Northeastern University 3-0
- Men's Division 2: Vassar College def. University of Maine at Farmington 22-10
- Women's Division 2: Vassar College def. University of New Hampshire 19-0
- Women's Division 3: University of Rhode Island def. College of the Holy Cross
