= Boston College Rugby Football Club =

US rugby union club, based in Chestnut Hill, MA

Boston College Men's Rugby
- Full name: Boston College Rugby Football Club
- Union: Liberty Rugby Conference
- Nickname: Eagles
- Founded: 1967; 59 years ago
- Ground: Chestnut Hill, MA
- Coach(es): (United States) Rob Conway (United States) Pat Rockwell
1st kit	2nd kit

Official website
- www.bcmensrugby.com

The Boston College Rugby Football Club, or BCRFC, is a collegiate rugby union team that represents Boston College. It competes in the East Coast Rugby Conference (ECRC). Like other Boston College athletic teams, BC ruggers are called the Boston College Eagles. With over 90 members, BC Rugby is one of the largest athletic teams at Boston College.

Founded in 1968, and with league play every fall and tournaments during the spring, BCRFC fields three sides – A, B, and Developmental – with over 80 players participating each year. BCRFC nears its 50th anniversary and has produced All Americans as well as players for the USA Eagles national team. The Eagles compete in the East Coach Rugby Conference each fall, against rivals AIC, Northeastern, Dartmouth, Fairfield, and UMass. Since 2013, Robert Conway has been the head coach of the Eagles.

== History ==
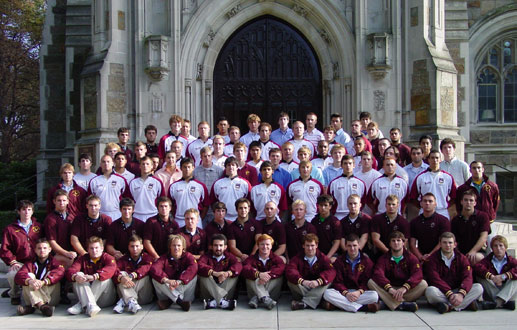
BC Ruggers on the steps of Burns Library, 2006

The Boston College Rugby Football Club celebrated its Centennial Season in 2005, making it one of the oldest rugby teams in the United States. The club was founded in 1968 by Brian King,'71. BCRFC's stated mission is to commit to the highest level of achievement on the pitch, in the classroom, and after graduation. In recent years, an additional emphasis on community service has reinforced the club's commitment to the university's Jesuit ideals. Many BCRFC alumni go on to participate in BC's Old Gold Rugby Football Club.

== Cups and competitions ==
=== CRC 7s ===
Initially making their debut in 2011, the Eagles have been invited to the Collegiate Rugby Championship for the past three years.

=== Jesuit Cup 7s ===
The Eagles became the inaugural Jesuit Cup 7s Champions in 2016, beating fellow Collegiate Rugby Championship team Notre Dame in the Championship Game. In 2017, the Eagles lost in the Cup final to Santa Clara University.

== Records & highlights ==
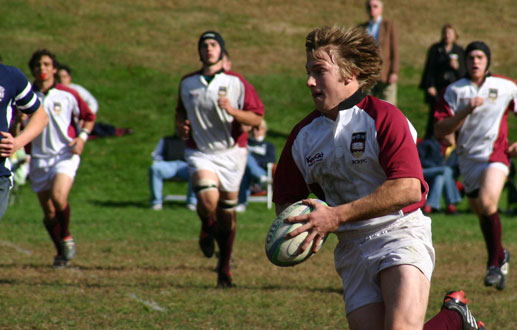
BC Ruggers on St. John's Field, BCRFC's home pitch

BC Rugby has consistently performed well, most recently going undefeated for an unprecedented three seasons in 2004, 2005, and 2006. Highlights of 2006 included capturing a Jesuit Invitational crown in Fairfield, Connecticut, going 2–1 at the 40th annual Cherry Blossom Tournament in Washington, D.C., and advancing to the NRU semifinals in Batavia, New York where they were defeated by Harvard. BCRFC finished 8–2 on the 2006 season, placing 3rd in the New England Rugby Football Union. The Eagles' undefeated play in the NERFU's White League gave them 1st place in the league.

Also in 2006, Joe Hughes, BC ’03, was selected for the United States National Rugby Team, to compete in the Rugby World Cup in 2007.

== Academics & community service ==
Although it competes at the highest intercollegiate level, Boston College Rugby is officially a club sport as determined by the Boston College Athletics Association. Membership is open to any Boston College undergraduate. As such, BCRFC membership reflects the diversity of Boston College and embodies the University's motto, "Ever to Excel". The club's emphasis on academic achievement is evident in an average GPA of 3.4. Members of the Club partake in the university's Honors Program, and many have been inducted into honor societies including Phi Beta Kappa and Alpha Sigma Nu. Several have won Fulbright scholarships and other prestigious post-graduate fellowships and awards. In addition to their many academic accomplishments, the BC ruggers fulfill regular service commitments to the Special Olympics, The American Red Cross and Nativity Prep, a tuition-free Jesuit middle school for inner-city students in Boston.

== Facilities ==
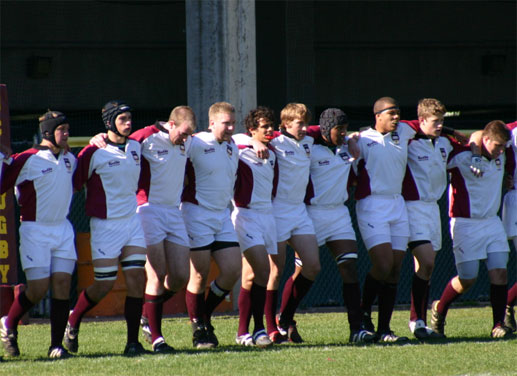
BC Ruggers on Shea Field

BCRFC's historic home pitch is St. John's Field on Boston College's Brighton campus. In the fall of 1994, owing to misunderstanding with the university administration, use of St. John's Field was suspended. During the subsequent 11 years, BC Rugby made use of other facilities including BC's Newton Soccer Complex, Eddie Pellagrini Diamond at John Shea Field, and Alumni Stadium as well as several off-campus locations. These arrangements proved unsatisfactory, and in the fall of 2005, use of St. John's Field was restored. In the early 2010s BCRFC began playing home matches at Alumni Stadium, and since 2018 has made use of the Fish Fieldhouse as a practice facility.
