= Empire Geographical Union =

Empire Rugby Football Union Geographical Union
- Abbreviation: Empire GU
- Formation: 2012
- Headquarters: New York City, New York
- Region served: New York State; Northern New Jersey; Southern Connecticut, United States of America
- President: Renee Ovrut
- Website: http://www.empiregurugby.com

The Empire Rugby Football Union Geographical Union ("Empire GU") is the governing body for over 100 men's and women's rugby union clubs and colleges in New York State, Northern New Jersey and Southern Connecticut.

== History ==
=== Formation ===
The Empire GU was created in July 2012 as a result of the merger of three governing bodies in the Northeastern United States: Northeast Rugby Union, New York State Rugby Conference (NYSRC) and Metropolitan New York Rugby Union (METNYRFU). When formed, Empire GU was one of four pilot Geographical Unions that have been developed by USA Rugby, and the first in the country to have been created by merging multiple former unions. The creation of these new GUs was carried out with the intention of creating a "more streamlined structure, effectively support growth in the game and provide increased member services in local areas". As of 2013, the GU structure ceased to be seen as a pilot program, being fully adopted as the local governance model for Club Rugby moving forward.

=== Structure ===
Empire GU comprises teams from New York State, Northern New Jersey and southern Connecticut. Some college teams are also included in the union. The GU encompasses the former Northeast Rugby Union, a Territorial Union (TU), and two former Local Area Unions (LAUs): New York State Rugby Conference (NYSRC) and Metropolitan New York Rugby Union (METNYRFU).

Upon creation of the Empire GU, NRU, NYSRC and METNYRFU were all dissolved. The last remaining member of the former NRU, New England Rugby Football Union (NERFU), was not absorbed into the new union, instead becoming a separate GU in its own right. Some NERFU teams, however, continue to compete in Empire GU's league system, namely in the Senior Men's D1, and the Senior Women's D1, D2 and D3.

== Clubs ==
=== Senior Men ===
| Division 1 | Division 2 New Jersey | Division 2 NYC | Division 2 Upstate |
|---|---|---|---|
| Boston*; Mystic*; Middlesex*; NYAC; Old Blue; Wolfhounds* | Bayonne; Monmouth; Montclair; Morris; Princeton; New Jersey; Union | NYRC; Village Lions; White Plains; New Haven; Fairfield Yankees; Old Blue | Rochester Aardvarks; Buffalo; South Buffalo; Syracuse |

| Division 3 CT/NY | Division 3 New Jersey | Division 3 NYC | Division 3 NY South | Division 3 Upstate |
|---|---|---|---|---|
| Greenwich; Danbury; CT Yankees; Saratoga; Hudson Valley | Monmouth; North Jersey; Union; Princeton; Montclair | Old Maroon; NYRC; Gotham; Lansdowne; Village Lions D3 | Brooklyn; Long Island; Suffolk; Rockaway Fisheads; Montauk | Ken-Ton Misfits; Buffalo; Southtowns Saxons; South Buffalo; Binghamton; Rochester Aardvarks; Rochester Colonials; Genesee Creamers; Barracks Rangers |

=== Senior Women ===
| Division 1 | Division 2 | Division 3 |
|---|---|---|
| Albany*; Boston*; Monmouth; Morris; Providence*; Village Lions | Beantown*; Brooklyn; Burlington*; Charles River*; Danbury; Hartford; North Shore*; Portland*; Seacoast*; Worcester* | Amonskeag*; Hudson Valley; Middlesex*; Saratoga; Springfield*; Suffolk |

* denotes a team that is a member of NERFU, not Empire GU

== See also ==
- Rugby union in the United States
