= Navy Midshipmen rugby =

College men's rugby team representing the Naval Academy

(United States) Navy Midshipmen Rugby
- Full name: Navy Midshipmen Rugby
- Union: USA Rugby
- Nickname: Midshipmen
- Founded: 1963; 63 years ago
- Location: Annapolis, Maryland
- Ground: Prusmack Rugby Complex
- Coach: Gavin Hickie
- League: Rugby East

Official website
- navysports.com/sports/mens-rugby

The Navy Midshipmen rugby team is the college rugby team of the United States Naval Academy. The Midshipmen have won one championship since the national collegiate championships for rugby began in 1980.

== History ==
Founded in 1963 and a varsity sport since the 2022–23 school year, Navy plays its regular season in the Rugby East Division 1-A Rugby conference. In 2009 Navy had 88 registered players making it the largest college rugby program in the United States.

Navy's rugby program is one of the most successful college rugby programs in the country. Since the inception of the national collegiate championship in 1980, Navy men's rugby reached the national semifinals twice in the 1980s and reached the semifinals 7 times during the 12-year span from 1996 to 2007. In the 2010–11 season Navy reached the national quarterfinals and finished the season ranked 9th in the country. Navy finished the 2012–13 season first in the Atlantic Coast Rugby League, and ranked 11th in the country. To date Navy's most successful season was their undefeated 2023 campaign culminating in a 28–22 victory over Cal in the 2023 Division 1-A Rugby Championship, their first title.

== Sevens ==
Navy has been successful in rugby sevens. Navy competed in the Collegiate Rugby Championship (CRC) from 2010–2019 and in 2023, reaching the quarter-finals on seven occasions and the semi-finals twice in 2013 and 2019. Navy also played in the 2012 USA Rugby Sevens Collegiate National Championships, advancing to the quarterfinals and finishing with a 4–2 record, including a win over rival Air Force.

== Performance ==
=== National championships ===
Division 1-A Rugby - Division I

- 1994: Runner-up
- 2023: National Champion
- 2024: Runner-up
- 2026: Runner-up

The following table is a list of each of the national championships since 1980 in which Navy has reached at least the semifinals.

Ed.	Season	Champion	Runner-Up	Third / Semi-finalists	Fourth	Location	Match Report
1	1980	California	Air Force	Illinois	Navy	Davenport, Iowa	
4	1983	California	Air Force	Navy	Illinois	Athens, Ga.	
15	1994	California	Navy	Air Force	Penn State	Dufour Stadium, Catholic University, D.C.	
17	1996	California	Penn State	Stanford	Navy	Colorado Springs, CO	
19	1998	California	Stanford	Navy	IUP	Balboa Park, San Francisco, CA	
20	1999	California	Penn State	Navy	Army	Balboa Park, San Francisco, CA	
22	2001	California	Penn State	Navy	Army	Virginia Beach, VA	
25	2004	California	Cal Poly-SLO	Air Force / Navy		Steuber Rugby Stadium, Stanford, CA	
26	2005	California	Utah	BYU / Navy		Steuber Rugby Stadium, Stanford, CA	
28	2007	California	BYU	Navy / Penn State		Steuber Rugby Stadium, Stanford, CA	
42	2023	Navy	California	BYU / Lindenwood		Houston, TX	
43	2024	St. Mary's	Navy	BYU / Life		Houston, TX	
45	2026	California	Navy	St. Mary's / Life		Indianapolis, Ind.	

=== Collegiate Rugby Championship (Sevens) ===
Year	Location	Position	Record
2010	Columbus, OH	QF	1–2–1
2011	Philadelphia, PA	Challenger SF	1–4
2012	Philadelphia, PA	QF	2–2
2013	Philadelphia, PA	SF	3–2
2014	Philadelphia, PA	QF	2–2
2015	Philadelphia, PA	QF	3–1
2016	Philadelphia, PA	Bowl QF	0–4
2017	Philadelphia, PA	Bowl SF	1–4
2018	Philadelphia, PA	QF	3–1
2019	Philadelphia, PA	SF	4–1
2023	Boyds, Maryland	Premier Challenge QF	0–3
