= 2012 Collegiate Rugby Championship =

Tournament details
- Tournament format(s): Round-robin and Knockout
- Date: June 2–3, 2012

Tournament statistics
- Teams: 16
- Attendance: 18,149
- Top point scorer(s): Derek Fish (Dartmouth) (60 points)
- Top try scorer(s): Trevor Tanifum (Maryland) (10 tries)

Final
- Venue: PPL Park, Philadelphia
- Champions: Dartmouth (2nd title)
- Runners-up: Arizona

The 2012 USA Sevens Collegiate Rugby Championship was a rugby union sevens tournament. The tournament was held on June 2–3 at PPL Park in Chester, Pennsylvania. It was the third annual Collegiate Rugby Championship, and the second year in a row that the tournament was held at PPL Park. Sixteen teams from colleges in the United States competed. Dartmouth College defeated Arizona in the final to secure their second CRC Championship in a row.

== Pool stage ==
=== Pool A ===
Team	Pld	W	D	L	PF	PA	+/-	Pts
Life	3	3	0	0	88	36	+52	9
Wisconsin	3	1	1	1	43	63	-20	6
Penn State	3	1	0	2	68	45	+23	5
Temple	3	0	1	2	26	81	-55	4

Date	Team 1	Score	Team 2
2012-06-02	Life University	19-17	Penn State
2012-06-02	Wisconsin	12-12	Temple
2012-06-02	Life University	33-7	Temple
2012-06-02	Penn State	15-19	Wisconsin
2012-06-02	Penn State	36-7	Temple
2012-06-02	Life University	36-12	Wisconsin

The teams from Group A collectively were 1-5 on day 2 in the knockout round.

=== Pool B ===
Team	Pld	W	D	L	PF	PA	+/-	Pts
Dartmouth	3	3	0	0	90	12	+78	9
Delaware	3	2	0	1	60	55	+5	7
Florida	3	1	0	2	29	52	-23	5
Maryland	3	0	0	3	28	88	-60	3

Date	Team 1	Score	Team 2
2012-06-02	Dartmouth	31-5	Delaware
2012-06-02	Maryland	7-19	Florida
2012-06-02	Dartmouth	31-7	Maryland
2012-06-02	Delaware	17-10	Florida
2012-06-02	Delaware	38-14	Maryland
2012-06-02	Dartmouth	28-0	Florida

The teams from Group B collectively were 8-2 on day 2 in the knockout round.

=== Pool C ===
Team	Pld	W	D	L	PF	PA	+/-	Pts
Arizona	3	3	0	0	104	19	+85	9
Texas	3	2	0	1	52	66	-14	7
Oklahoma	3	1	0	2	52	71	-19	5
North Carolina State	3	0	0	3	24	69	-45	3

Date	Team 1	Score	Team 2
2012-06-02	Arizona	33-12	Oklahoma
2012-06-02	NC State	14-17	Texas
2012-06-02	Arizona	33-7	Texas
2012-06-02	NC State	10-21	Oklahoma
2012-06-02	Arizona	38-0	NC State
2012-06-02	Texas	28-19	Oklahoma

The teams from Group C collectively were 4-4 on day 2 in the knockout round.

=== Pool D ===
Team	Pld	W	D	L	PF	PA	+/-	Pts
California	3	3	0	0	79	15	+64	9
Navy	3	2	0	1	63	50	+13	7
Army	3	1	0	2	29	68	-39	5
Notre Dame	3	0	0	3	20	58	-38	3

Date	Team 1	Score	Team 2
2012-06-02	Army	10-5	Notre Dame
2012-06-02	California	21-10	Navy
2012-06-02	Army	14-34	Navy
2012-06-02	California	29-0	Notre Dame
2012-06-02	Notre Dame	15-19	Navy
2012-06-02	Army	5-29	California

The teams from Group D collectively were 2-4 on day 2 in the knockout round.

== Knockout stage ==
=== Championship Bracket ===
Quarter-finals
3 June – PPL Park
Life University	12
Delaware	5
3 June – PPL Park
Arizona	26
Navy	5
3 June – PPL Park
Dartmouth	35
Wisconsin	5
3 June – PPL Park
California	54
Texas	5

Semi-finals
3 June – PPL Park
Life University	12
Arizona	19
3 June – PPL Park
Dartmouth	21
California	19

Final
3 June – PPL Park
Arizona	5
Dartmouth	24
Bronze
3 June – PPL Park
Life University	7
California	26

=== Challenger Bracket ===
Quarter-finals
3 June – PPL Park
Penn State	26
Maryland	28
3 June – PPL Park
Oklahoma	21
Notre Dame	19
3 June – PPL Park
Florida	29
Temple	24
3 June – PPL Park
Army	7
NC State	22

Semi-finals
3 June – PPL Park
Maryland	32
Oklahoma	12
3 June – PPL Park
Florida	31
NC State	5

Final
3 June – PPL Park
Maryland	14
Florida	20

== Players ==
The following 12 players were selected by Rugby Mag as members of the All-Tournament team:

1. Peter Tiberio - Arizona
2. Brett Thompson - Arizona
3. Cam Dolan - Life University
4. Madison Hughes - Dartmouth
5. Trevor Tanifum - Maryland
6. Seamus Siefring - Navy
7. Bobby Impson - Oklahoma
8. Eric Luikens - Texas
9. Nate Brakeley - Dartmouth
10. Derek Fish - Dartmouth
11. Brad Harrington - Cal
12. Paul Bosco - Cal

=== Leading Scorers ===
Rank	Tries	Points	Conversions
1	Trevor Tanifum (Maryland) (10)	Derek Fish (Dartmouth) (60)	Derek Fish (Dartmouth) (20)
2	Brett Thompson (Arizona) (9)	Peter Tiberio (Arizona) (54)	Peter Tiberio (Arizona) (17)
3	Madison Hughes (Dartmouth) (6)	Trevor Tanifum (Maryland) (50)	Alex Aronson (Cal) (12)
4	Kevin Clark (Dartmouth) (6)	Brett Thompson (Arizona) (45)	Bobby Impson (Oklahoma) (9)
5	Seamus Siefring (Navy) (5)	Bobby Impson (Oklahoma) (38)	Matias Cima (Maryland) (9)
