= 2022 Collegiate Rugby Championship =

Tournament details
- Countries: United States
- Tournament format(s): Knockout
- Date: May 28 – May 30, 2022

Tournament statistics
- Teams: 32
- Matches played: 94

Final
- Venue: Gold Mine on Airline, New Orleans, Louisiana
- Champions: Kutztown (1st title)
- Runners-up: Dartmouth

The 2022 Collegiate Rugby Championship was a college rugby sevens tournament played from May 28–30, 2022 at Gold Mine on Airline in New Orleans, Louisiana. The tournament is also known as May Madness. It was the 12th annual Collegiate Rugby Championship, and the second consecutive year that the tournament was held in New Orleans. The men's Premier Cup competition consisted of 32 teams, while the women's premier cup competition featured 16 teams. The tournament as a whole featured 110 teams competing across six men’s and women’s divisions, making it the largest ever collegiate rugby tournament. All teams competed in a single elimination bracket. Lindenwood entered the tournament as three-time defending champions. Kutztown won their first CRC title defeating Dartmouth 17–12 in the final. Lindenwood won their fourth women's title defeating Life 19–7 in the final. The CBS Sports Network broadcast five matches per day with the remaining matches available on The Rugby Network. Teams which were knocked out of the Premier Cup Bracket, competed in the Champion Plate, Challenge Bowl, and the Survivor Shield. Notre Dame College won the Champion Plate, Fordham won the Challenge Bowl, and Air Force won the Survivor Shield.

== Premier Cup Bracket ==
First Round; May 28
1	Indiana	27
8	Florida	15
5	Michigan	5
4	American International	40
6	Virginia Tech	14
3	Dartmouth	24
7	Nazareth College (NY)	7
2	Notre Dame College	37

Second Round; May 29
1	Indiana	22
4	American International	10
3	Dartmouth	14
2	Notre Dame College	0

Quarterfinals; May 29
1	Indiana	17
3	Dartmouth	19

First Round; May 28
1	Mount St. Mary's	19
8	West Chester	5
5	Minnesota	12
4	Cal Maritime	24
6	Iowa CCC	26
3	Iona	29
7	Air Force	7
2	Army	34

Second Round; May 29
1	Mount St. Mary's	26
4	Cal Maritime	31
3	Iona	22
2	Army	21

Quarterfinals; May 29
4	Cal Maritime	20
3	Iona	26

First Round; May 28
1	Kutztown	31
8	Maryland	0
5	Louisville	14
4	Iowa State	17
6	Northeastern	29
3	South Carolina	7
7	Fordham	7
2	Penn State	26

Second Round; May 29
1	Kutztown	43
4	Iowa State	0
6	Northeastern	7
2	Penn State	15

Quarterfinals; May 29
1	Kutztown	59
2	Penn State	14

First Round; May 28
1	Lindenwood	31
8	James Madison	5
5	Clemson	19
4	Notre Dame	38
6	Harvard	7
3	Wheeling	35
7	LSU	5
2	St Bonaventure	33

Second Round; May 29
1	Lindenwood	26
4	Notre Dame	12
3	Wheeling	22
2	St Bonaventure	14

Quarterfinals; May 29
1	Lindenwood	29
3	Wheeling	7

== Final Four ==
National Semifinals; May 30
3	Dartmouth	33
3	Iona	10
1	Kutztown	24
1	Lindenwood	19

National Championship Game; May 30
3	Dartmouth	12
1	Kutztown	17
Third place
3	Iona	0
1	Lindenwood	31

== Women's DI Premier final ==
Lindenwood 19 – 7 Life

== DI Club finals ==
Men's final: Sam Houston State 17 – 15 Salisbury
Women's final: Roger Williams 12 – 7 Wisconsin–Eau Claire

== Players ==
=== Most Valuable Player ===
- Mate' Kvirikashvili (Kutztown)

=== Men's All Tournament Team ===
- Kekoa Kauwe (Kutztown)
- Jasper Green (Dartmouth)
- Lorenzo Villani (St. Bonaventure)
- Michael Weir (Dartmouth)
- Evan Williams (Lindenwood)
- Jonah Wolfe (Cal Maritime)
- Mate' Kvirikashvili (Kutztown)
