= Collegiate Championship Invitational =

US rugby union sevens tournament

Tournament details
- Tournament format(s): Round-robin and Knockout
- Date: June 4–6, 2010

Tournament statistics
- Teams: 16
- Matches played: 39
- Top point scorer(s): Rocco Mauer (Bowling Green) (55 points)
- Top try scorer(s): Rocco Mauer (Bowling Green) (11 points)

Final
- Venue: Columbus Crew Stadium, Ohio
- Champions: Utah (1st title)
- Runners-up: California

The USA Sevens Rugby Collegiate Championship Invitational, (also now referred to as the 2010 Collegiate Rugby Championship), was a rugby union sevens tournament. The competition was held from 4–6 June at Columbus Crew Stadium in Columbus, Ohio. The CCI was a groundbreaking event in college rugby for several reasons—it was the first ever rugby sevens championship contested among college rugby programs, and it was the first time college rugby was broadcast live on network TV. This was the only year that the tournament was called the "Collegiate Championship Invitational." The following year, the tournament changed its name to the "Collegiate Rugby Championship."

The men's tournament featured sixteen teams, whereas the women's tournament featured eight teams. The tournament consisted of four round-robin pools of four teams. All sixteen teams progressed to the knockout stage. The top two teams from each group progressed to the quarter-finals in the championship competition. The bottom two teams from each group progressed to the quarter-finals in the challenger competition.

Utah defeated Cal 31-26 in overtime in a thrilling final. Bowling Green's Rocco Mauer led the tournament with 11 tries and was named tournament MVP by Rugby Mag.

Sponsors for the tournament included Subway, Geico, Bud Light and Toyota.

== Pool Standings ==
=== Pool A ===
Team	W	L	D	PF	PA	+/-	Pts
California	3	0	0	88	7	81	9
Dartmouth	2	1	0	57	39	18	7
Notre Dame	1	2	0	12	51	-39	5
Harvard	0	3	0	20	80	-60	3

=== Pool B ===
Team	W	L	D	PF	PA	+/-	Pts
San Diego State	3	0	0	62	21	41	9
Tennessee	2	1	0	70	29	41	7
Indiana	1	2	0	31	67	-36	5
Florida	0	3	0	24	70	-46	3

=== Pool C ===
Team	W	L	D	PF	PA	+/-	Pts
Arizona	2	0	1	39	26	13	8
Navy	1	1	1	33	36	-3	6
Arizona State	1	2	0	32	39	-7	5
Army	0	1	2	24	27	-3	5

=== Pool D ===
Team	W	L	D	PF	PA	+/-	Pts
Utah	3	0	0	57	27	30	9
Ohio State	2	1	0	41	31	10	7
Bowling Green	1	2	0	29	36	-7	5
Penn State	0	3	0	31	65	-34	3

== Knockout stage ==
Quarter-finals
6 June – Columbus Crew Stadium
California	36
Tennessee	0
6 June – Columbus Crew Stadium
Arizona	21
Ohio State	10
6 June – Columbus Crew Stadium
Utah	24
Navy	0
6 June – Columbus Crew Stadium
San Diego State	17
Dartmouth	7

Semi-finals
6 June – Columbus Crew Stadium
California	33
Arizona	0
6 June – Columbus Crew Stadium
Utah	17
San Diego State	10

Final
6 June – Columbus Crew Stadium
California	26
Utah	31
Bronze
6 June – Columbus Crew Stadium

== Notable players ==
After the conclusion of the tournament, Rugby Mag selected the following 12 players on the All-Tournament team. These players were chosen based on the impact they had made during the tournament and also based on their potential to succeed at higher levels of rugby.

1. Blaine Scully - California
2. Colin Hawley - California
3. Seamus Kelly - California
4. Rocco Mauer - Bowling Green
5. Nate Ebner - Ohio State
6. Will Holder - Army
7. Thretton Palamo - Utah
8. Don Pati - Utah
9. Keegan Engelbrecht - Cal
10. Dustin Muhn - Cal
11. Duncan Kelm - San Diego State
12. Benji Goff - Tennessee
