= Collegiate Rugby Championship =

US college rugby sevens tournament

- Current season, competition or edition: 2026 Collegiate Rugby Championship
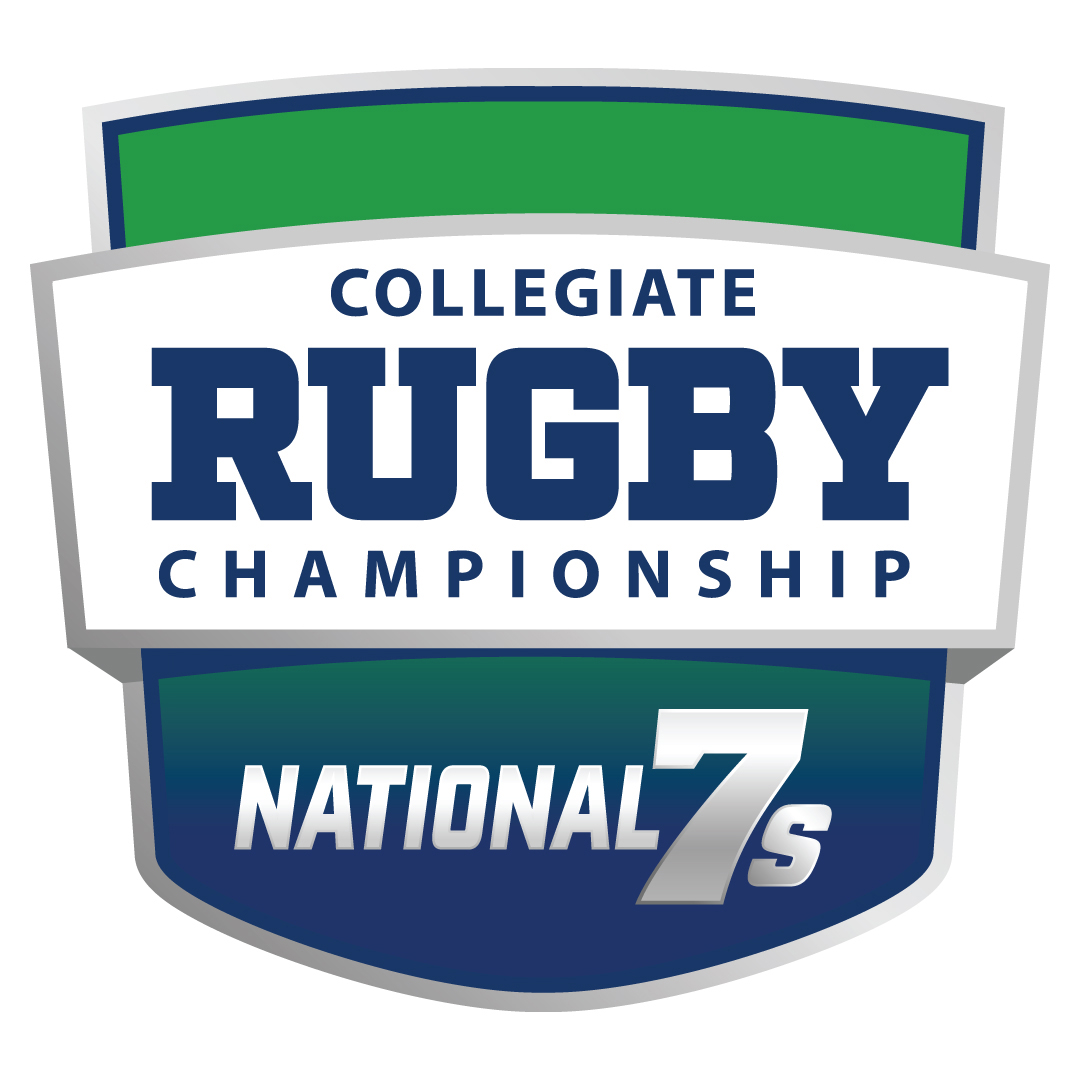
- Sport: Rugby sevens
- Founded: 2010
- First season: 2010
- CEO: Jeremy Treece
- Organizing body: National Collegiate Rugby
- No. of teams: 144
- Country: United States
- Most recent champions: Men's: Wheeling (3rd title); Women's: American International (1st title) (2026)
- Most titles: California (5 titles)
- Broadcaster: The Rugby Network
- Website: collegiaterugbychampionship.com

The Collegiate Rugby Championship (CRC) is an annual college rugby sevens tournament. The CRC capitalized on the surge in popularity of rugby at major universities following the 2009 announcement of the addition of rugby sevens to the Summer Olympics. The CRC (called Collegiate Championship Invitational in its first year, 2010) began as an independent competition run by USA Sevens, LLC, owned by American International Media LLC. It was the highest profile college rugby sevens competition in the United States, with the tournament broadcast live on NBC from 2010 to 2017 and on ESPN News and ESPN3 in 2018 and 2019. The CRC as it existed during this period has been called "the old CRC". Beginning in 2021, the tournament has been organized by National Collegiate Rugby (NCR) for its member schools under license for the name and logo. It was broadcast by Rugby Network in 2021 and 2023 and CBS Sports in 2022. Since the CRC franchise was licensed to NCR, the tournament has primarily featured comparatively smaller universities. USA Rugby, the older rival of NCR, conducts its separate collegiate sevens championship annually, organized by its arm, the College Rugby Association of America.

== Format and qualifying ==
The tournament has expanded since its inaugural competition, which featured sixteen sides, to include thirty-two sides competing in all divisions for both men and women in the 2024 tournament. The competition was played over the course of two days. Instead of the typical pool play seeding that was done in prior years, there were now cup and plate brackets. This format ensured that every game had to be won to secure the championship title. The first round held 16 matches, and the 8 winners from that would advance to the cup brackets and the losers to the bowl and shield brackets. This sorting of teams would continue until two were left in the cup bracket for a championship game.

The majority of the participating teams are invited to the tournament based on winning a qualifying tournament recognized by the National Collegiate Rugby. Teams can also participate by getting an at-large bid from the Collegiate Rugby Championship Committee.

== History ==
The inaugural 2010 Collegiate Rugby Championship, at the time known as the Collegiate Championship Invitational (CCI), was held in Columbus, Ohio, at the Columbus Crew Stadium. Utah defeated Cal 31–26 in overtime in a thrilling final. Bowling Green's Rocco Mauer led the tournament with 11 tries and was named tournament MVP by Rugby Mag.

The 2011 Collegiate Rugby Championship moved to PPL Park in Philadelphia, Pennsylvania. NBC increased their coverage over the previous year, devoting 14 hours of coverage to the tournament. California and Arizona were favored after cruising to victories in the first day of pool play, but both were knocked out in quarterfinal upsets. Ultimately, Dartmouth beat Army 32–10 in the final.

Due to the strong support from Philadelphia fans and its Pennsylvania-based title sponsorship, Penn Mutual Life Insurance Company, the CRC remained in Philadelphia through 2019. Beginning in 2021, after a year's absence, the tournament has been organized by National Collegiate Rugby (NCR) for its member schools under license for the name and logo. It moved to New Orleans in 2021 and was played at the Gold Mine on Airline. That venue again hosted the tournament for the 2022 edition, with television coverage provided by CBS Sports. Having previously been held in late Spring, the 2023 tournament was moved to late April and the venue once again changed to the Maryland SoccerPlex in the Washington, D.C. metro area.

== Past results ==
=== Men's Cup ===
Year	Venue	Final			Bronze*		
Year	Venue	Winner	Score	Runner-up	Winner	Score	Runner-up
2010	Columbus Crew Stadium, Columbus, OH	Utah	31–26	California	Arizona; San Diego State		
2011	PPL Park, Chester, PA	Dartmouth	32–10	Army	Utah	12–10	Central Washington
2012	PPL Park, Chester, PA	Dartmouth	24–5	Arizona	California	26–7	Life University
2013	PPL Park, Chester, PA	California	19–17	Life University	Navy; UCLA		
2014	PPL Park, Chester, PA	California	24–21	Kutztown	Life University; UCLA		
2015	PPL Park, Chester, PA	California	17–12	Kutztown	Life University; Arizona		
2016	Talen Energy Stadium, Chester, PA	California	31–7	UCLA	Kutztown; Arizona		
2017	Talen Energy Stadium, Chester, PA	California	19–0	Life University	Lindenwood; Indiana		
2018	Talen Energy Stadium, Chester, PA	Lindenwood	24–7	UCLA	Life University; Arizona		
2019	Talen Energy Stadium, Chester, PA	Lindenwood	21–12	Life University	Navy; Kutztown		
2020	Cancelled due to COVID-19 pandemic						
2021	Gold Mine, New Orleans, LA	Lindenwood	24–14	Life University	Army	12–10	Davenport
2022 (Premier)	Gold Mine, New Orleans, LA	Kutztown	17–12	Dartmouth	Lindenwood	31–0	Iona
2023 (Premier)	Maryland SoccerPlex, Greater Washington, DC	Mount St. Mary's	19–5	Indiana	Kutztown; Belmont Abbey		
2024 (Premier)	Maryland SoccerPlex, Greater Washington, DC	Wheeling	29–12	Kutztown	Babson	35–14	Iowa Central
2025 (Premier)	Maryland SoccerPlex, Greater Washington, DC	Wheeling	19–5	St. Bonaventure	Queens	17–12	Belmont Abbey
2026 (Premier)	Maryland SoccerPlex, Greater Washington, DC	Wheeling	14–12	Dartmouth	Kutztown	24–12	Notre Dame
*Both semifinalists are listed as "Bronze Winners" in years in which a third place match was not contested.

=== Men's championships ===
CRC Championships by school
– 5 championships – 3 championships – 2 championships – 1 championship

Team	#	Years
California	5	2013, 2014, 2015, 2016, 2017
Lindenwood	3	2018, 2019, 2021
Dartmouth	3	2011, 2012
Wheeling University	2	2024, 2025, 2026
Utah	1	2010
Kutztown	1	2022
Mount St. Mary's	1	2023

=== Appearances ===
- CH Champion
- RU Runner-up
- SF Semifinals
- QF Quarterfinals
- • Participant

	APP	10	11	12	13	14	15	16	17	18	19	21	22(P)	23(P)	24(P)	25(P)	26(P)
School																	
Dartmouth	15	QF	CH	CH	QF	QF	•	QF	•	QF	•		RU	•	•	QF	RU
Notre Dame	15	•	•	•	•	•	•	•	•	•	•		•	•	•	•	SF
Navy	11	QF	•	QF	SF	QF	QF	•	•	QF	SF			•			
Penn State	11	•	QF	•	QF	QF	•	QF	•	QF	QF		QF				
Kutztown	12				QF	RU	RU	SF	QF	•	SF		CH	SF	RU	•	SF
Virginia Tech	12				•	•	•	•	•	•	•		•	•	•	•	•
Arizona	10	SF	QF	RU	QF	•	SF	SF	•	SF	•						
Indiana	12	•					QF	•	SF	•	•		QF	RU	QF	•	QF
California	9	RU	QF	SF	CH	CH	CH	CH	CH		•						
Life	9			SF	RU	SF	SF	QF	RU	SF	RU	RU					
Army	9	•	RU	•				•	•	•	•	SF	•				
Temple	9		•	•	•	•	•	•	•	•	•						
South Carolina	8					•		•	•	•	•		•	•	•		
UCLA	7				SF	SF	•	RU	QF	RU	QF						
St. Joseph's	7				•	•	•	•	•	•	•						
Michigan	8					QF	QF	•					•	•	QF	•	•
Clemson	8						•	•	•		•		•		•	•	•
Wisconsin	7			QF	•			•	•	•	•						•
Air Force	7						•			•		QF	•	•	•		•
Maryland	7			•		•		•		•			•		QF		•
Boston College	6		•				•	•	•	•	•						
Iona	7									QF	QF		SF	•	•	•	•
Texas	5		QF	QF	•	•	•										
Lindenwood	5								SF	CH	CH	CH	SF				
Wheeling University	6											•	QF	QF	CH	CH	CH
Delaware	6			QF	•				•	•						•	•
St. Bonaventure	6										•		•	QF	•	RU	QF
Arkansas State	4						QF	QF	QF	•							
Tennessee	4	QF						•	•					•			
Notre Dame College	4											QF	•	•	•		
Florida	4	•		•	•								•				
Northeastern	4				•	•							•	•			
Harvard	5	•											•		•	•	•
Nazareth College (NY)	4											•	•	•		•	
Fordham	5										•		•		•	•	•
American International	6								•				•		•	•	QF
Marian University	5											•		•	•	•	•
Utah	4	CH	SF					•									•
Mt St. Mary's	3												•	CH	•		
Ohio State	3	QF	•			•											
James Madison	3											QF	•	•			
Iowa CCC	3												•		SF	QF	
Belmont Abbey	4													SF	•	SF	QF
Mary Washington	4													QF	QF	•	•
Brown	4													•	•	QF	•
Rio Grande	4													•	•	•	•
Fairfield	4													•	•	•	•
Siena	4													•	•	QF	•
Aquinas	4													•	•	•	•
Central Washington	2		SF							•							
St. Mary's	2								QF		QF						
Oklahoma	2		•	•													
NC State	2			•	•												
Penn	2				•	•											
Drexel	2					•		•									
LSU	2		•										•				
Iowa State	2											•	•				
Alabama	2						•								•		
Babson	2														SF	•	
Queens	2														QF	SF	
Loyola (MD)	2											•				•	
San Diego State	2	SF															•
Davenport	1											SF					
Western Michigan	1											QF					
Cal Maritime	1												QF				
Arizona State	1	•															
Bowling Green	1	•															
North Carolina	1		•														
Villanova	1				•												
Colorado-Denver	1										•						
Franciscan	1											•					
Salve Regina	1											•					
Wayne State	1											•					
Lander University	1											•					
New Mexico Tech	1											•					
Central College (IA)	1											•					
Louisiana	1											•					
Tulane	1											•					
University of Denver	1											•					
Mckendree University	1											•					
Taylor University	1											•					
Christendom College	1											•					
Scholastica	1											•					
West Chester	1												•				
Louisville	1												•				
USC	1													•			
Howard	1													•			
Thomas More	1													•			
Eastern Carolina	1													•			
Southern Virginia	2														•		•
Principa	1														•		
South Nazarene	1														•		
Texas A&M	1															•	
Walsh	2															•	•
Adrian	1															•	
Purdue	1															•	
Drury	1															•	
Indiana Tech	1																•
Wingate	1																•
Kentucky	1																•

=== Women's Cup ===
CRC Championships by school
– 4 championships – 3 championships – 2 championships – 1 championship

Year	Final		
Year	Winner	Score	Runner-up
2011	Army	14–5	Penn State
2012	Not held		
2013	Penn State	31–5	Ohio State
2014	Penn State	29–12	James Madison University
2015	Penn State	24–7	Lindenwood
2016	Life	19–10	Lindenwood
2017	Life	17–12	Lindenwood
2018	Lindenwood	21–12	Penn State
2019	Lindenwood	34–12	Army
2020	Not held		
2021	Lindenwood	10–7	Life
2022 (Premier)	Lindenwood	19–7	Life
2023 (Premier)	Brown	21–19	Army
2024 (Premier)	Brown	12–5	Army
2025 (Premier)	Brown	19–7	Army
2026 (Premier)	American International	24–7	Brown

=== Women's Championships ===
Team	#	Years
Lindenwood	4	2018, 2019, 2021, 2022
Penn State	3	2013, 2014, 2015
Brown	3	2023, 2024, 2025
Life	2	2016, 2017
American International	1	2026
Army	1	2010

== Popularity ==
The Collegiate Rugby Championship initially succeeded in drawing media attention. NBC recognized that rugby was growing in popularity, participation and interest, and NBC's broadcast of the inaugural 2010 CRC was the second time college rugby had been broadcast live on network TV in the US. (The first broadcast was on CBS's "Sports Spectacular" program in April 1960 when Stanford and Dartmouth played a match at West Point}. The honor of first collegiate try ever scored on broadcast TV belongs to Evan Kaufman of Indiana University. NBC Sports Programming President, Jon Miller, described NBC's support of the Collegiate Rugby Championship, "We're hoping to see continued growth in the ratings and the attendance. We like the sport a lot, and we've given it a great time period and a real plumb (sic) position on our schedule." Tournaments broadcast by NBC posted respectable TV ratings, with the TV audience larger than that of the NCAA lacrosse championships.

Due in part to the exposure from NBC's broadcasts, the tournament attracted several blue chip corporate sponsors, including Geico, Subway, Toyota and Bud Light. The CRC is popular with fans, with over 17,000 fans turning out to watch the 2011 tournament, and over 18,000 fans in attendance at the 2012 tournament. This was followed by a twenty-two percent increase in attendance from 2014 to 2015 totaling 24,813 and an even further increase in 2016 to a total attendance of 27,224. In September 2014, Penn Mutual life insurance company announced a multi-year title sponsorship of the annual championship, which led to the tournament being renamed to the Penn Mutual Collegiate Rugby Championship.

The Collegiate Rugby Championship sparked a mini revolution in college rugby, prompting scores of schools to begin offering a rugby sevens program. One of the schools that benefited from the publicity generated by the CRC tournament has been the University of Texas. Following Texas' participation in the CRC, Texas "raised an additional $10,000 from alumni, landed a new apparel sponsor, and have been contacted by 90 students (including two DBs from the football team) who want to play rugby." The CRC has also given a boost of exposure to lesser known schools with strong rugby programs. For example, when Life University went undefeated in pool play and reached the semifinals of the June 2–3 2012 CRC, Life University's Wikipedia page was viewed by 9,800 people that weekend.

Year	TV Viewership	Ratings	Channel	Stadium Attendance	References
2010	692,000 (Day 2); 818,000 (Day 3)	0.5 (Day 2); 0.6 (Day 3)	NBC		
2011	750,000 (Day 1); 797,000 (Day 2)	0.6 (Day 1); 0.6 (Day 2)	NBC	17,894	
2012		0.6 (Day 1); 0.6 (Day 2)	NBC	18,149	
2013			NBC	19,275	
2014	427,000	0.4 (Day 2); 0.5 (Day 3)	NBC	19,181	
2015	571,000 (Day 1); 647,000 (Day 2)	0.4 (Day 1); 0.4 (Day 2)	NBC	24,592	
2016	506,000 (Day 1); 545,000 (Day 2)	0.3 (Day 1); 0.5 (Day 2)	NBC	27,224	
2017	427,000 (Day 1); 530,000 (Day 2)	0.3 (Day 1); 0.4 (Day 2)	NBC, NBCSN	37,518*	
2018			ESPNews, ESPN+, ESPN2	27,002	
2019			ESPNews, ESPN+, ESPN2	27,587	
2020	Cancelled due to COVID-19 pandemic				
2021	—N/a	—N/a	The Rugby Network		
2022			CBS Sports		
2023	—N/a	—N/a	The Rugby Network		
2024	—N/a	—N/a	The Rugby Network		
*The Saturday crowd set the CRC one-day attendance record with a crowd of 14,973.

== Rivalries ==
Despite the fact that the CRC tournament has only been around since 2010, the tournament has seen some notable rivalries:

- Army v. Navy – these Service Academy rivals met four times from 2010–16 and 2019, with Navy leading 3–2.
- Texas v. Oklahoma – these Big 12 rivals met in 2011 & 2012, with Texas winning both encounters.
- Cal v. Utah – these Pac-12 rivals met in the knockout rounds of the 2010 & 2011 tournaments, with the underdog Utah upsetting the favored Cal both times.

== Notable past players and coaches ==
The Collegiate Rugby Championship has been notable for its ability to showcase the emerging stars of US rugby. In 2012, representatives from all 12 clubs in the English Premiership (the top professional league in England) attended the CRC, where the Premiership coaches scouted talent from the 16 university teams competing.

The following athletes who have starred in the CRC and made the All Tournament team have gone on to play for the United States national rugby sevens team or United States national rugby union team in international competitions:

Player name	CRC All Tournament	College
Rocco Mauer	2010	Bowling Green
Colin Hawley	2010	California
Thretton Palamo	2010	Utah
Nate Ebner	2010, 2011	Ohio State
Will Holder	2010, 2011	Army
Blaine Scully	2010, 2011	California
Don Pati	2010, 2011	Utah
Duncan Kelm	2010	San Diego State
Tim Stanfill	2011	Cent. Washington
Ben Leatigaga	2011	Army
Peter Tiberio	2011, 2012	Arizona
Nate Brakeley	2011, 2012	Dartmouth
Brett Thompson	2012, 2013	Arizona
Cam Dolan	2012, 2013	Life University
Seamus Kelly	2010, 2013, 2014	California
Madison Hughes	2012, 2013, 2014	Dartmouth
Danny Barrett	2013	California
Jake Anderson	2013	California
Niku Kruger	2014, 2015	Kutztown
Cody Melphy	2016, 2017	Life University
Deion Mikesell	2018	Lindenwood
Ben Broselle	2018, 2019	UCLA
Richelle Stephens	2019, 2021	Lindenwood

Alex Magleby, who became head coach of the United States national rugby sevens team in 2012, was previously head coach of Dartmouth, the team he coached to victory at the 2011 Collegiate Rugby Championship and 2012 Collegiate Rugby Championship.

== CRC Hall of Fame ==
The Collegiate Rugby Championship added a new aspect to the tournament in 2024. It is a Hall of Fame where individuals are recognized for their excellence within this tournament. This new addition has the intent of becoming an annual tradition. The inaugural class for the hall of fame had six inductees. This Hall of Fame class includes both players and the founders of the Collegiate Rugby Championship, Jon and Patti Prusmack. The 2025 Hall of Fame class included five inductees, this class houses both players and a coach that have outstanding accomplishments both at the Collegiate Rugby Championship and beyond.

Name	CRC Tournaments	Role	College	Induction Year	Ref.
Rocco Mauer	2010	Player	Bowling Green	2024	
Nate Ebner	2010, 2011	Player	Ohio State	2024	
Meya Bizer	2013, 2014, 2015	Player	Penn State	2024	
KB Slaughter	2016, 2017	Player	Life	2024	
Jon Prusmack	—N/a	Founder	—N/a	2024	
Patti Prusmack	—N/a	Founder	—N/a	2024	
Alex Magleby	2011, 2012	Coach	Dartmouth	2025	
Thretton Palamo	2010	Player	Utah	2025	
Anna Karen Pedraza	2015, 2016, 2017, 2018	Player	Lindenwood	2025	
Nicole Strasko	2015, 2016	Player	Life	2025	
Kevon Williams	2014, 2015, 2016	Player	New Mexico Highlands	2025	
Gregg "Doc" Jones	2013-2019, 2022-2026	Coach	Kutztown	2026	
Darian Lovelace	2016, 2017	Player	Life	2026	
Chris Mattina	2012, 2013	Player	Delaware	2026	
Richelle Stephens	2019, 2021	Player	Lindenwood	2026	

== Leading players ==
Year	Most tries (Men's Premier)		Most tries (Women's Premier)		Most points (Men's Premier)		Most points (Women's Premier)		MVP*	Ref.
2010	Rocco Mauer (Bowling Green)	11			Rocco Mauer (Bowling Green)	55			Rocco Mauer (Bowling Green)	
2011	Peter Tiberio (Arizona); Chris Downer (Dartmouth)	8			Peter Tiberio (Arizona)	54			Chris & Nick Downer (Dartmouth)	
2012	Trevor Tanifum (Maryland)	10			Derek Fish (Dartmouth)	60			Madison Hughes (Dartmouth)	
2013	Joe Cowley (Life)	9			Joe Cowley (Life)	81			Seamus Kelly (California)	
2014										
2015	Alex Faison-Donahoe (Kutztown); Mike Eife (Penn State); Conner Mooneyham (Life)	4			Niku Kruger (Kutztown); Blane McIlroy (Life)	25			Jake Anderson (California)	
2016	Niall Barry (UCLA)	6			Cian Barry (UCLA)	35			Jesse Milne California)	
2017									Sam Cusano (California)	
2018									Ben Broselle (UCLA)	
2019									Wesley White (Lindenwood)	
2021									Evan Williams (Lindenwood)	
2022									Mate' Kvirikashvili (Kutztown)	
2023									Chris Cleland (Mount St. Mary's)	
2024	Shadreck Mandaza (Wheeling)	10			Shadreck Mandaza (Wheeling)	64			Aaron Juma (Wheeling)	
2025	Zak Banton (Notre Dame)	10			Shadreck Mandaza (Wheeling)	61			Shadreck Mandaza (Wheeling)	
2026	Zak Banton (Notre Dame)	8	Sereana Vulaono (New Haven)	12	Tito Edjua (Brown)	56	Sereana Vulaono (New Haven)	60	Zach Herrington (Slippery Rock)	
*Tournament MVP as selected by Rugby Mag/Rugby Today/NCR.

== See also ==
- College rugby
- Division 1-A Rugby
- Intercollegiate sports team champions
- USA Rugby Sevens Collegiate National Championships
