= 2015 Collegiate Rugby Championship =

Tournament details
- Tournament format(s): Round-robin and Knockout
- Date: May 30–31, 2015

Tournament statistics
- Teams: 20
- Attendance: 24,952

Final
- Venue: PPL Park, Philadelphia
- Champions: California (3rd title)
- Runners-up: Kutztown

The 2015 Collegiate Rugby Championship was a college rugby sevens tournament held May 30–31 at PPL Park, a soccer stadium in the Chester suburb of Philadelphia, PA. It was the sixth annual Collegiate Rugby Championship (CRC), and the fifth consecutive year that the tournament was held at PPL Park. The tournament is known for sponsorship reasons as the 2015 Penn Mutual Collegiate Rugby Championship.

== Qualifying ==
Several of the 2015 CRC teams were invited to play, but three teams reached the 2015 CRC via conference qualifying tournaments and one via the national Las Vegas Invitational qualifying tournament:

- Southeastern conference 7s champion: Alabama
- Big Ten conference 7s champion: Indiana
- Atlantic Coast conference 7s champion: Virginia Tech
- Las Vegas Invitational: Arkansas State

University of California, the defending champion from 2013 and 2014, entered the tournament as the favorite, due to the strength and depth of their squad.

== Pool stage ==
Team qualified for the Cup Championship

=== Pool A ===
Team	Pld	W	D	L	PF	PA	+/-	Pts
California	3	3	0	0	84	17	+67	9
Virginia Tech	3	1	1	1	60	48	+12	6
Notre Dame	3	1	0	2	43	90	–47	5
Boston College	3	0	1	2	37	69	–32	4

Winner	Score	Loser
California	33–5	Boston College
Virginia Tech	36–19	Notre Dame
California	39–5	Notre Dame
Virginia Tech	17–17	Boston College
California	12–7	Virginia Tech
Notre Dame	19–15	Boston College

=== Pool B ===
Team	Pld	W	D	L	PF	PA	+/-	Pts
Navy	3	3	0	0	63	26	+37	9
Kutztown	3	2	0	1	85	45	+40	7
Air Force	3	1	0	2	43	63	–20	5
Temple	3	0	0	3	26	83	–57	3

Winner	Score	Loser
Navy	12–7	Temple
Kutztown	24–14	Air Force
Navy	24–14	Kutztown
Air Force	24–12	Temple
Navy	27–12	Air Force
Kutztown	49–7	Temple

=== Pool C ===
Team	Pld	W	D	L	PF	PA	+/-	Pts
Indiana	3	3	0	0	78	36	+42	9
Life	3	2	0	1	81	38	+43	7
Alabama	3	1	0	2	26	75	–49	5
Clemson	3	0	0	3	31	67	–36	3

Winner	Score	Loser
Indiana	26–12	Alabama
Life	26–14	Clemson
Alabama	14–12	Clemson
Indiana	24–19	Life
Life	36–0	Alabama
Indiana	27–5	Clemson

=== Pool D ===
Team	Pld	W	D	L	PF	PA	+/-	Pts
Arkansas State	3	3	0	0	58	15	+43	9
Michigan	3	2	0	1	51	39	+12	7
UCLA	3	1	0	2	62	36	+26	5
Texas	3	0	0	3	20	101	–81	3

Winner	Score	Loser
Arkansas St.	17–5	Michigan
UCLA	50–0	Texas
Arkansas St.	22–10	Texas
Michigan	17–12	UCLA
Michigan	29–10	Texas
Arkansas St.	19–0	UCLA

=== Pool E ===
Team	Pld	W	D	L	PF	PA	+/-	Pts
Arizona	3	2	0	1	62	22	+40	7
Dartmouth	3	2	0	1	46	41	+5	7
Saint Joseph's	3	1	0	2	40	60	–20	5
Penn State	3	1	0	2	44	69	–25	5

Winner	Score	Loser
Arizona	33–10	Penn State
Dartmouth	31–7	St. Joseph's
St. Joseph's	12–5	Arizona
Dartmouth	15–10	Penn State
Penn State	24–21	St. Joseph's
Arizona	24–0	Dartmouth

== Knockout stage ==
=== Shield ===
Semifinals
17	Boston College	38
20	Texas	5
18	Clemson	17
19	Temple	21

Finals
17	Boston College	12
19	Temple	19

=== Bowl ===
Semifinals
13	Saint Joseph's	21
16	Alabama	14
14	Penn State	0
15	Notre Dame	22

Finals
13	Saint Joseph's	17
15	Notre Dame	22

=== Plate ===
Semifinals
9	Dartmouth	20
12	Air Force	5
10	Virginia Tech	10
11	UCLA	27

Finals
9	Dartmouth	5
11	UCLA	33

=== Cup ===
Quarterfinals
1	California	31
8	Michigan	0
4	Navy	5
5	Life	15
3	Indiana	12
6	Kutztown	31
2	Arkansas State	5
7	Arizona	7

Semifinals
1	California	33
5	Life	5
6	Kutztown	19
7	Arizona	14

Finals
1	California	17
6	Kutztown	12

== Players ==
=== Leading scorers ===
Rank	Player	Tries	Player	Points
1	Alex Faison-Donahoe (Kutztown)	4	Niku Kruger (Kutztown)	25
2	Mike Eife (Penn State)	4	Blane Mcllroy (Life)	25
3	Conor Mooneyham (Life)	4	Alex Faison-Donahoe (Kutztown)	20
4	(several players tied)	3	Mike Eife (Penn State)	20
5			Conor Mooneyham (Life)	20
