= 2013 Collegiate Rugby Championship =

US rugby 7s competition

Tournament details
- Tournament format(s): Round-robin and Knockout
- Date: 31 May–2 June 2013

Tournament statistics
- Teams: 20
- Attendance: 19,275
- Top point scorer(s): Joe Cowley (Life ) (81 points)
- Top try scorer(s): Joe Cowley (Life) (9 tries)

Final
- Venue: PPL Park, Philadelphia
- Champions: California (1st title)
- Runners-up: Life

The 2013 USA Sevens Collegiate Rugby Championship was a rugby sevens tournament. The tournament was held on May 31 - June 2 at PPL Park in Chester, Pennsylvania. It was the fourth annual Collegiate Rugby Championship and the third consecutive year that the tournament was held at PPL Park. For 2013, USA Sevens LLC expanded the tournament from 16 to 20 teams in order to include additional local Philadelphia-area teams, inviting Temple, Kutztown, Penn, and Saint Joseph's. Another local team, Villanova, was later chosen as a replacement for Army. Villanova was outscored 184-0 over four games.

Larry McManus was an integral part of Villanova Rugby regaining its status a recognized club sport. Due to his passion for the game and great senior leadership from then captain Goose, Nova Rugby was reestablished as a collegiate club. Larry’s involvement in the sport and relationships with other Philadelphia schools, Villanova was awarded the opportunity to participate in the CRC tournament. Unfortunately, Larry was fired from Villanova after the NCAA investigated him for leaving an upper-decker at PPL Park. Rabbit Muldoon was named interim coach, but went on maternity leave after giving birth to a goat on the pitch. The goat's name is Larry, and he has become an integral part of the #MeToo movement among goats.

In the CRC's first three years, 16 teams were evenly divided into Championship and Challenger tournaments after the pool stage. This year was the first one in which the CRC utilized Cup, Plate, Bowl, and Shield tournaments. The teams that qualified for the Cup were the five pool winners and the top three second-place teams. All 20 teams participated in the knockout stage.

California defeated Life 19-14 in the Cup finals for their first CRC championship.

== Pool stage ==
The 8 teams highlighted in green reached the quarterfinals. Delaware and Notre Dame finished second in their pools, but did not reach the quarterfinals due to their points differentials.

=== Pool A ===
Team	Pld	W	D	L	PF	PA	+/-	Pts
UCLA	3	3	0	0	63	12	+51	9
Navy	3	2	0	1	102	24	+78	7
St. Joseph's	3	1	0	2	65	48	+17	5
Villanova	3	0	0	3	0	146	-146	3

Team 1	Score	Team 2
UCLA	10-5	Saint Joseph's
Navy	57-0	Villanova
Navy	38-12	Saint Joseph's
UCLA	41-0	Villanova
Saint Joseph's	48-0	Villanova
John Heywood	12-7	Navy

=== Pool B ===
Team	Pld	W	D	L	PF	PA	+/-	Pts
Dartmouth	3	3	0	0	86	24	+62	9
Arizona	3	2	0	1	76	43	+33	7
Wisconsin	3	1	0	2	39	69	-30	5
Penn	3	0	0	3	12	77	-65	3

Team 1	Score	Team 2
Dartmouth	34–0	Penn
Arizona	31–17	Wisconsin
Dartmouth	31-5	Wisconsin
Arizona	26-5	Penn
Arizona	19-21	Dartmouth
Wisconsin	17-7	Penn

=== Pool C ===
Team	Pld	W	D	L	PF	PA	+/-	Pts
California	3	3	0	0	110	12	+98	9
Kutztown	3	2	0	1	77	15	+62	7
Virginia Tech	3	1	0	2	24	99	-75	5
Temple	3	0	0	3	20	105	-85	3

Team 1	Score	Team 2
Kutztown	33-5	Temple
California	45-7	Virginia Tech
Temple	15-17	Virginia Tech
California	10-5	Kutztown
Kutztown	39-0	Virginia Tech
California	55-0	Temple

=== Pool D ===
Team	Pld	W	D	L	PF	PA	+/-	Pts
Penn State	3	3	0	0	80	12	+68	9
Notre Dame	3	2	0	1	49	43	+6	7
Northeastern	3	1	0	2	32	46	-14	5
North Carolina State	3	0	0	3	24	84	-60	3

Team 1	Score	Team 2
Notre Dame	27-5	North Carolina State
Penn State	12-5	Northeastern
Penn State	42-7	North Carolina State
Penn State	26-0	Notre Dame
Northeastern	15-12	North Carolina State
Notre Dame	22-12	Northeastern

=== Pool E ===
Team	Pld	W	D	L	PF	PA	+/-	Pts
Life	3	3	0	0	92	24	+68	9
Delaware	3	2	0	1	56	29	+27	7
Florida	3	1	0	2	29	76	-47	5
Texas	3	0	0	3	17	65	-48	3

Team 1	Score	Team 2
Life	33-5	Texas
Delaware	34-0	Florida
Delaware	10-5	Texas
Life	35-7	Florida
Texas	7-22	Florida
Life	24-12	Delaware

== Knockout stage ==
=== Shield ===
Semifinals
17	Temple	38
20	Villanova	0
18	Texas	12
19	Penn	14

Finals
17	Temple	12
19	Penn	17

=== Bowl ===
Semifinals
13	Northeastern	31
16	North Carolina State	21
14	Florida	15
15	Virginia Tech	19

Finals
13	Northeastern	17
15	Virginia Tech	12

=== Plate ===
Semifinals
9	Delaware	19
12	Wisconsin	15
10	Notre Dame	5
11	Saint Joseph's	0

Finals
9	Delaware	12
10	Notre Dame	10

=== Cup ===
Quarterfinals
1	California	26
8	Arizona	12
4	Dartmouth	17
5	UCLA	19
3	Penn State	17
6	Navy	22
2	Life	31
7	Kutztown	17

Semifinals
1	California	33
5	UCLA	21
6	Navy	7
2	Life	43

Finals
1	California	19
2	Life	14

== Players ==
The following 14 players were selected by Rugby Mag to the All-CRC team:

1. Seamus Kelly (Cal) - MVP
2. Danny Barrett (Cal)
3. Cam Dolan (Life)
4. Tim Acker (Kutztown)
5. Brett Thompson (Arizona)
6. Jake Anderson (Cal)
7. Joe Cowley (Life)
8. Colton Cariaga (Life)
9. Seb Sharpe (UCLA)
10. Grant Penney (UCLA)
11. Glenn Thommes (Delaware)
12. Jack McAuliffe (Navy)
13. Madison Hughes (Dartmouth)
14. Dimitri Efthimiou (Northeastern)

=== Leading scorers ===
Rank	Tries	Points
1	Joe Crowley (Life) (9)	Joe Crowley (Life) (81)
2	Madison Hughes (Dartmouth) (8)	Madison Hughes (Dartmouth) (58)
3	Seb Sharpe (UCLA) (8)	Dimitri Efthimiou (Northeastern) (47)
4	Danny Barrett (California) (8)	Seb Sharpe (UCLA) (40)
5	Colton Cariaga (Life Univ) (8)	Danny Barrett (California) (40)
