= Peter Steinberg =

English rugby union player & coach

Pete Steinberg
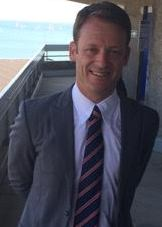
- Born: 16 May 1971 (age 55) Cambridge, United Kingdom
- School: Sawston Village College

Rugby union career
- Position: Fly-half / Scrum-Half
Coaching career
- Years: Team
- 1995–2014: Penn State Rugby
- 2006: USA Hawks
- 2003–2007: MARFU
- 2011–2017: United States

Pete Steinberg (born 16 May 1971) is an American rugby union coach and former player. He is the current head coach of the United States. He has previously coached the Penn State Rugby. He was born in Cambridge, United Kingdom.

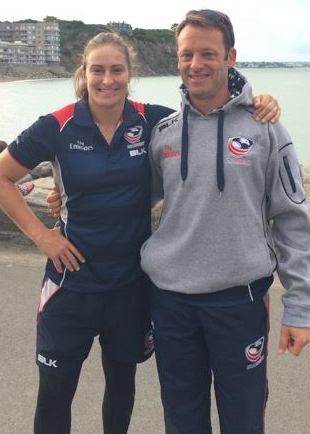
The 2014 National Team Captain and Coach Pete Steinberg.

== Coaching career ==
In 1995, Steinberg moved from Assistant Coach to Head Coach for the Penn State women's rugby team, replacing Coach Charlie Smith. Steinberg built upon what Smith started, and created a college rugby dynasty at Penn State Rugby winning national championships in 1997, 2000, 2004, 2007, 2009, 2010, 2011, 2012, 2013, and 2014.

Steinberg coached the United States women's national rugby team during the 2014 Women's Rugby World Cup in Paris and in 2017 Women's Rugby World Cup in Ireland. He stepped down as Head Coach after the 2017 World Cup.

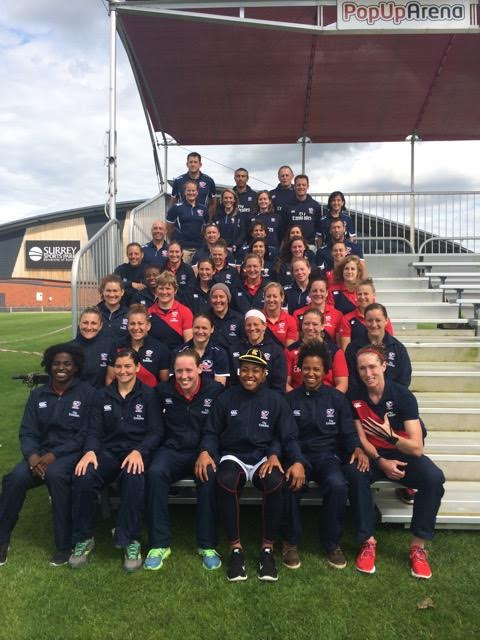
The 2014 National Team With Pete Steinberg.

== Honors ==
- D1 College Rugby National Championship
  - Winner: 2007, 2009
- D2 College Rugby National Championship
  - Winner: 2004
- NASC MARFU National Championship
  - Winner: 2005
- Sports Illustrated Face in the Crowd
  - Winner: 2004

Sporting positions
Preceded by (United States) Kathy Flores	United States National Rugby Union Team Coach; 2011–2017	Succeeded by Rob Cain
