= 2026 Division 1-A Rugby Championship =

Rugby union competition

Division 1-A Rugby Championship

Tournament details
- Countries: United States
- Tournament format(s): knockout
- Date: April 11, 2026 – May 2, 2026

Tournament statistics
- Teams: 16
- Matches played: 15

Final
- Venue: Kuntz Memorial Soccer Stadium
- Champions: California (28th title)
- Runners-up: Navy

The 2026 Division 1-A Rugby Championship was the fourteenth season of the Division 1-A Rugby championship, the annual university rugby union competition run by USA Rugby involving the top sixteen college teams in the United States. Cal entered as defending champions having beaten Life in the 2025 final 55–38. Cal beat Navy 36–22 for their second striaght final victory.

== Teams ==
Sixteen clubs from the five major conferences compete in the 2026 National Championship playoffs.

The distribution of teams is:

- California: three teams
- Rugby East: six teams
- Independent: thee teams
- Mid-West Conference: three teams
- Rocky Mountain: two teams

The following teams qualified for the tournament.

California	East	Independent	Mid-West	Rocky Mountain
Cal Poly; Saint Mary's; San Diego	Army; Life; Mary Washington; Mount St. Mary's; Navy; Penn State	Arizona; California; Grand Canyon	Arkansas State; Lindenwood	BYU; Colorado State

== Team locations ==
Locations
– East, – West

== Standings ==
Rugby East
Pos.	Team	Record	PD	BP	Pts
1	(Maryland) Navy	5–0	+144	4	24
2	(Georgia (U.S. state)) Life	4–1	+173	4	20
3	(New York (state)) Army	3–2	+42	3	15
4	(Maryland) Mount St. Mary's	2–3	–87	2	10
5	(Virginia) University of Mary Washington	1–4	–152	0	4
6	(Pennsylvania) Penn State	0–5	–120	3	3

Big Ten
Big Ten East
Pos.	Team	Record	PD	Points
1	(Indiana) Notre Dame	3–0	+61	12
2	Michigan	2–1	+40	8
3	Ohio State	1–2	+32	4
4	Michigan State	0–3	–133	0
Big Ten West
Pos.	Team	Record	PD	Points
1	Indiana	3–0	+94	12
2	Wisconsin	2–1	+34	8
3	Illinois	1–2	–40	4
4	(Indiana) Purdue	0–3	–88	0

Mid-West
Pos.	Team	Record	PD	BP	Pts
1	(Missouri) Lindenwood	5–0	+251	4	24
2	Arkansas State	4–1	+118	4	20
3	(Michigan) Davenport	2–4	–54	2	10
4	(Illinois) McKendree	0–6	–315	2	2

California
Southern California
Pos.	Team	Record	PD	BP	Pts
1	(California) Long Beach State	6–4	+81	7	31
2	(California) Cal Poly	6–2	+362	6	30
3	(California) San Diego	5–1–0	+251	6	28
4	(California) San Diego State	5–4	–39	7	27
5	(California) UCLA	5–2	+123	1	21
6	(California) UC Santa Barbara	2–1–7	–338	5	15
Northern California
Pos.	Team	Record	PD	BP	Pts
1	(California) Saint Mary's	8–0	+726	8	40
2	(California) Santa Clara	4–4	–130	5	21
3	(California) UC Santa Cruz	3–6	–278	4	16
4	(California) UC Davis	1–7	–329	6	10
6	(California) Sacramento State	0–9	–429	6	6

Independent
Team	Record	PD
Arizona	10–4	
California	13–0	
(Arizona) Grand Canyon	7–4	
(Florida) St. Thomas		
(British Columbia) UBC		

Rocky Mountain
Pos.	Team	Record	PD	BP	Pts
1	(Utah) BYU	5–0	+303	4	24
2	Colorado State	4–1	+75	3	19
3	Utah	4–1	+3	3	19
4	Colorado	2–3	–23	2	10
5	Wyoming	2–3	–87	1	9
6	Utah State	1–4	–67	3	7
7	(Colorado) Air Force	1–4	–92	2	6
8	Utah Valley	1–4	–112	0	4

== Bracket ==
Playoffs

Sweet 16 (April 11)	Elite Eight (April 18)
1	California	83
8	San Diego	5
1	California	96
4	BYU	12
4	BYU	33
5	Cal Poly	19
WEST
3	Arizona	41
6	Grand Canyon	35
3	Arizona	19
2	Saint Mary's	48
2	Saint Mary's	69
7	Colorado State	10
1	Navy	40
8	Mary Washington	11
1	Navy	38
4	Army	10
4	Army	42
5	Arkansas State	17
EAST
3	Life	61
6	Mount St. Mary's	5
3	Life	31
2	Lindenwood	24
2	Lindenwood	31
7	Penn State	10

Final Four (April 25)
1	California	59
2	Saint Mary's	19
1	Navy	35
3	Life	21

National Championship Game (May 2)
1	California	36
1	Navy	22

=== Round 1 ===
11 April 2026

California	88–5	(California) San Diego
Try: T Archer 5' m N Cominskey (3) 15' m, 34' c, 61' m M Threlkeld 21' c S Deely 25' c T Tuimaunei 29' c E Cook (3) 31' c, 41' m, 57' m C Saint 54' c M de Beer 65' c E Lewis 69' c P Symington 77' c Con: C Saint (9/15) 21', 25', 29', 31', 34', 54', 65', 69', 77'	Report	Try: 72' m Con: (0/1)

Witter Rugby Field, Berkeley, California

11 April 2026
13:00

BYU (Utah)	33–19	(California) Cal Poly
Try: W. Pugmire 16' c S Fountaine 23' m C Connors 32' m J Tenney 57' c R Larsen 64' m C Erikson 71' c Con: V Mataele (3/6) 16', 57', 71'	Report	Try: 49' c 60' m 66' c Con: (2/3) 49', 66'

South Field, Provo, Utah

11 April 2026

Arizona	41–35	(Arizona) Grand Canyon
Try: Morgan; D Slaughter; J Schumacher; E Heim; A Andersson; I Morrill; M Berenger; Con: M Berenger (1/4); S Gerstl (2/3)	Report	Try: L Jackson 28' c D Mercer 41' c V McKeefery c D Sanchez c S Siaki C Con: V Allue (5/5) 28', 41'

Sitton Field, Tucson, Arizona

11 April 2026
13:00

Saint Mary's (California)	69–10	Colorado State
Try: S Ix-Siu (2) c, c I Toia’ivao 10' c A Tukuafu 16' c B Hatch 20' c E Younger 24' m K Tingin m Toia'ivao (2) m, c m N Corcoran-Clark c Con: T Pappas (5/9); R Pool (2/2)	Report	Try: L Cullingworth c Con: A Agasse (1/1); Pen: A Agasse (1/1)

Saint Mary's Stadium, Moraga, California

== Rudy Scholz Award ==
=== Winner ===
- Solomon Williams – California

=== Finalists ===
- Roanin Krieger – Navy
- Dom Besag – Saint Mary's
- Solomon Williams – Cal
- Logan Ballinger – Life

=== Nominations ===
- George Engels – Army West Point
- Logan Ballinger – Life University
- Aaron Van Dyk – Arkansas State
- Roanin Krieger – US Naval Academy
- Manu Taula – St. Bonaventure
- Solomon Williams – Univ. of Cal - Berkeley
- Jack McAllister – Lindenwood
- Kieran Downs – San Diego
- Sosaia Pongi – Saint Mary's
- Coby Baker – Cal Poly
- Dom Besag – Saint Mary's
- Drew Baublitz – US Naval Academy
- Rand Santos – Univ. of Cal - Berkeley
- Marco Lapierre – Brown
- Matteo Berenger – Arizona

== 2025–2026 First Team All Americans ==
- Oliver Kirk – University of California – Berkeley
- Adam Chadwick – Life University
- Luke Shaefer – Lindenwood University
- Byron Finley – Lindenwood University
- Liam Walsh – Army
- George Engels – Army
- Maximus Goethals – Davenport University
- Edmund Soeder – United States Naval Academy
- Solomon Williams – University of California – Berkeley
- Rand Santos – University of California – Berkeley
- Avion Ganse – United States Naval Academy
- Dominic Besag – Saint Mary's College
- Andrew Baublitz – United States Naval Academy
- Masi Koi – University of California – Berkeley
- Ronan Krieger – United States Naval Academy
- Ian Bullock – United States Naval Academy
- Cade Crist – University of California – Berkeley
- Dalton Slaughter – University of Arizona
- Logan Ballinger – Life University
- Austin Taylor – United States Naval Academy
- Siale Ofa – Saint Mary’s College
- James Rose – Life University
- Taoniashe Mapani – St Thomas University
