= 2023 Collegiate Rugby Championship =

College rugby sevens tournament

Tournament details
- Countries: United States
- Tournament format(s): Knockout
- Date: April 28 – April 30, 2023

Tournament statistics
- Teams: 32
- Matches played: 94

Final
- Venue: Maryland SoccerPlex, Boyds, Maryland
- Champions: Mount St. Mary's (1st title)
- Runners-up: Indiana

The 2023 Collegiate Rugby Championship was a college rugby sevens tournament played from April 28–30, 2023 at Maryland SoccerPlex in Boyds, Maryland. The tournament is also known as May Madness. It was the 13th annual Collegiate Rugby Championship, and the first year that the tournament was held in Maryland. The men's Premier Cup competition consisted of 32 teams, while the women's premier cup competition featured 16 teams. The men's tournament as a whole featured 74 teams competing across four divisions. All teams in the Premier bracket competed in a single elimination bracket. Kutztown entered the tournament as defending champions. Lindenwood entered the tournament as four-time defending champions of the women's tournament. The matches were shown on The Rugby Network and National Collegiate Rugby's YouTube channel. Mount Saint Mary's won the men's Premier Cup defeating Indiana 19–5 in the final.

== Premier Cup Bracket ==
First Round; April 28
1	Indiana	22
8	Tennessee	0
5	Marian	5
4	Dartmouth	7
6	Air Force	19
3	Queens	26
7	Navy	0
2	Brown	26

Second Round; April 29
1	Indiana	31
4	Dartmouth	5
3	Queens	14
2	Brown	12

Quarterfinals; April 29
1	Indiana	32
3	Queens	5

First Round; April 28
1	Kutztown	31
8	Nazareth College (NY)	0
5	Northeastern	17
4	South Carolina	12
6	USC	5
3	Notre Dame	17
7	Rio Grand	7
2	St Bonaventure	24

Second Round; April 29
1	Kutztown	19
5	Northeastern	12
3	Notre Dame	7
2	St Bonaventure	12

Quarterfinals; April 29
1	Kutztown	21
2	St Bonaventure	12

First Round; April 28
1	Wheeling	26
8	Howard	0
5	Thomas More	10
4	Fairfield	5
6	Michigan	0
3	Mount St. Mary's	41
7	Virginia Tech	12
2	Adrian	17

Second Round; April 29
1	Wheeling	22
5	Thomas More	0
3	Mount St. Mary's	21
2	Adrian	7

Quarterfinals; April 29
1	Wheeling	5
3	Mount St. Mary's	7

First Round; April 28
1	Notre Dame College	41
8	East Carolina	0
5	Belmont Abbey	19
4	Siena	17
6	Iona	5
3	Aquinas	17
7	James Madison	0
2	Mary Washington	27

Second Round; April 29
1	Notre Dame College	7
5	Belmont Abbey	12
3	Aquinas	14
2	Mary Washington	19

Quarterfinals; April 29
5	Belmont Abbey	14
2	Mary Washington	7

== Final Four ==
National Semifinals; April 30
1	Indiana	26
1	Kutztown	5
3	Mount St. Mary's	22
5	Belmont Abbey	5

National Championship Game; April 30
1	Indiana	5
3	Mount St. Mary's	19

== Women's D1 Premier final ==
Brown 21 – 19 Army

== D1 Club finals ==
Men's final: University of San Diego 15 – 7 Clemson
Women's final: Clemson 29 – 17 Massachusetts

== Players ==
=== Most Valuable Player ===
- Chris Cleland (Mount St. Mary's)
