= 2018 Collegiate Rugby Championship =

Tournament details
- Countries: United States
- Tournament format(s): Round-robin and Knockout
- Date: June 1–3, 2018

Tournament statistics
- Teams: 24
- Attendance: 27,002

Final
- Venue: Talen Energy Stadium, Chester, Pennsylvania
- Champions: Lindenwood (1st title)
- Runners-up: UCLA

The 2018 Collegiate Rugby Championship was a college rugby sevens tournament played June 1–3 at Talen Energy Stadium in Chester, Pennsylvania, a suburb of Philadelphia. It was the ninth annual Collegiate Rugby Championship, and the eight consecutive year that the tournament was at Talen Energy Stadium (formerly known as PPL Park). The event was broadcast on ESPN+, ESPN2 and ESPNews. The men's tournament consisted of 24 teams split into six pools. Lindenwood won both the men's and women's championships. To claim their first title in only their second appearance in the tournament, Lindenwood defeated UCLA in the men's final. Total attendance for the three day tournament was 27,002 including a record setting 15,109 for Saturday pool play.

== Pool stage ==
Team qualified for the Cup Championship

=== Pool A ===
Team
Lindenwood
Saint Joseph's University
Wisconsin
Mount St. Mary's

=== Pool B ===
Team
Arizona
Indiana
South Carolina
Boston College

=== Pool C ===
Team
Dartmouth
Iona College
Kutztown
Temple

=== Pool D ===
Team
Life
Penn State
Air Force
Notre Dame

=== Pool E ===
Team
UCLA
Arkansas State
Virginia Tech
Delaware

=== Pool F ===
Team
Navy
Central Wash
Army
Maryland

== Knockout stage ==
=== Bowl ===
Finals
Kutztown	18
Air Force	12

=== Plate ===
Finals
Army	12
Virginia Tech	17

=== Cup ===
Quarterfinals
1	Life	12
8	Penn State	5
5	Lindenwood	22
4	Navy	0
6	Dartmouth	28
3	UCLA	33
2	Arizona	17
7	Iona	0

Semifinals
1	Life	7
4	Lindenwood	17
3	UCLA	26
2	Arizona	10

Finals
4	Lindenwood	24
3	UCLA	7

== Women's D1 final ==
Lindenwood 21 – 12 Penn State

== Players ==
=== Mark Dombroski Most Valuable Player ===
- Ben Broselle

== Freedom Cup ==
With their 2018 Freedom Cup victory, Fordham qualified for the CRC Championship top division in 2019.

Finals
Fordham	24
West Chester	0
