= Nate Brakeley =

American rugby union player (born 1989)

- Born: August 31, 1989 (age 37) Marblehead, Massachusetts
- Height: 6 ft 5 in (1.96 m)
- Weight: 260 lb (120 kg)
- School: St. John's Prep
- University: Dartmouth College

Rugby union career
- Position(s): Lock; Flanker
Amateur team(s)
Years	Team	Apps	(Points)
2008–2012	Dartmouth College		
2012	Cambridge University		
2013–2018	New York Athletic Club		
- Correct as of April 9, 2018
Senior career
Years	Team	Apps	(Points)
2018–2023	Rugby New York	42	(10)
- Correct as of 6 March 2023
International career
Years	Team	Apps	(Points)
2018	USA Selects	3	(0)
2016–2023	United States	34	(5)
- Correct as of 19 November 2023

Nate Brakeley (born August 31, 1989) is an American former professional rugby union player who played lock and flanker for Rugby New York (Ironworkers) of Major League Rugby (MLR) and for the United States men's national team. Brakeley also played for the New York Athletic Club.

== Early life and education ==
Brakeley began playing rugby in high school, playing four years at St. John's Preparatory School.

Brakeley went on to attend Dartmouth College, where he majored in engineering. While there, Brakeley was a member of the Dartmouth Rugby team that won Collegiate Rugby Championships in 2011 and 2012.

Brakeley also attended Cambridge University, where he earned an MPhil in energy technology. While at Cambridge, Brakeley played for the Cambridge University rugby team and participated in the 2012 Varsity Match at Twickenham Stadium—a 26–19 defeat to Oxford. After returning to the United States, Brakeley played for Cambridge's touring team for one match against the Men's Collegiate All-Americans.

== Club career ==
=== New York Athletic Club ===
After completing his studies at Cambridge and returning to the United States, Brakeley began playing club rugby for the New York Athletic Club in 2013. He was a starter for the NYAC team that defeated the Austin Blacks 44-39 in the 2015 USA Rugby Men's Division I Club National Championship at Infinity Park in Glendale, Colorado.

=== Rugby New York ===
Brakeley joined Rugby United New York (RUNY) for their inaugural season as an associate member of Major League Rugby in 2018. Brakeley started at lock in each of RUNY's three exhibitions against the Ontario Arrows and Boston Mystics in March 2018. Brakeley maintained a full-time job as a data analyst while playing professionally in Major League Rugby.

On June 19, 2022, Brakeley became the twenty-fifth MLR player to appear in 50 matches. Brakeley captained New York to the franchise's first MLR championship in the 2022 final, a 30-15 victory against the Seattle Seawolves at Red Bull Arena in Harrison, New Jersey on June 25, 2022.

== International career ==
=== USA Selects ===
In September 2018, it was announced that Brakeley had been selected for the USA Selects roster for the 2018 Americas Pacific Challenge.

=== USA Eagles ===
Brakeley made his debut with the USA Eagles on February 13, 2016, starting at flanker in the Eagles' 30–22 victory over Canada in the 2016 Americas Rugby Championship. Brakeley scored his first try for the Eagles in the Eagles' 52–16 victory over Canada on July 1, 2017, in a qualification match for the 2019 Rugby World Cup.

During the 2019 Rugby World Cup in Japan, Brakeley juggled Test matches and training sessions with the Eagles with a full-time remote job for a real estate technology company in New York.

In his final test match, Brakeley captained the Eagles to victory in a 42-12 win over Spain in the final of La Vila International Rugby Cup.
