= 2021 Collegiate Rugby Championship =

Tournament details
- Countries: United States
- Tournament format(s): Knockout
- Date: May 29 – May 31, 2021

Tournament statistics
- Teams: 28
- Matches played: 52

Final
- Venue: Gold Mine on Airline, New Orleans, Louisiana
- Champions: Lindenwood (3rd title)
- Runners-up: Life

The 2021 Collegiate Rugby Championship was a college rugby sevens tournament played from May 29–31, 2021 at Gold Mine on Airline in New Orleans, Louisiana. The tournament is also known as May Madness. It was the eleventh annual Collegiate Rugby Championship, and the first year that the tournament was held in New Orleans. The men's competition consisted of 28 teams while the women's competition contained 12 teams. All teams compete in a single elimination bracket. Lindenwood are the two-time defending champions. All matches played in the stadium were broadcast on The Rugby Network and on the National Collegiate Rugby YouTube channel. Lindenwood won the women's competition, beating Life in the final, 10–7. Likewise, Lindenwood beat Life, 24–14 in the men's final to claim their third consecutive title. Teams which were knocked out of the Premier Cup Bracket, competed in the Champion Plate, Challenge Bowl, and the Survivor Shield. Wheeling won the Champion Plate, Central College won the Challenge Bowl, and Mckendree won the Survivor Shield.

== Premier Cup Bracket ==
First Round; May 29
1	Life
8	Bye #1
5	Loyola (MD)	14
4	Salve Regina University	12
6	Franciscan	0
3	Iowa State	34
7	Wayne State	7
2	Western Michigan	34

Second Round; May 30
1	Life University	50
5	Loyola (MD)	0
3	Iowa State	17
2	Western Michigan	22

Quarterfinals; May 30
1	Life University	59
2	Western Michigan	0

First Round; May 29
1	Army
8	Bye #3
5	Lafayette	0
4	Lander University	45
6	New Mexico Tech	12
3	Wheeling University	38
7	Central College (IA)	0
2	Air Force	27

Second Round; May 30
1	Army	31
4	Lander University	5
3	Wheeling University	17
2	Air Force	19

Quarterfinals; May 30
1	Army	31
2	Air Force	5

First Round; May 29
1	Lindenwood
8	Bye #2
5	Louisiana	36
4	Tulane	5
6	University of Denver	14
3	McKendree University	10
7	Taylor University	5
2	Notre Dame College	17

Second Round; May 30
1	Lindenwood	29
5	Louisiana	10
6	University of Denver	5
2	Notre Dame College	12

Quarterfinals; May 30
1	Lindenwood	45
2	Notre Dame College	0

First Round; May 29
1	Davenport
8	Bye #4
5	Marian	0
4	Christendom College	24
6	Nazareth College (NY)	5
3	James Madison	24
7	Scholastica	0
2	Mount St. Mary's	46

Second Round; May 30
1	Davenport	22
4	Christendom College	5
3	James Madison	22
2	Mount St. Mary's	5

Quarterfinals; May 30
1	Davenport	15
3	James Madison	10

== Final Four ==
National Semifinals; May 31
1	Life	36
1	Army	19
1	Lindenwood	24
1	Davenport	7

National Championship Game; May 31
1	Life	14
1	Lindenwood	24
Third place
1	Army	12
1	Davenport	10

== Women's D1 final ==
Lindenwood 10 – 7 Life

== Players ==
=== Most Valuable Player ===
Evan Williams

=== Men's All Tournament Team ===
- Lucas Pattison (Army West Point)
- Marnus Spangenberg (Lindenwood University)
- Joey Backe (Western Michigan University)
- Chase Schor-Haskin (Life University)
- Owen Kennedy (Christendom College)
- Ishma-Eel Safodien (Life University)
- George Phelan (Life University)
- Evan Williams (Lindenwood University)
- Ryan Johnstone (Air Force Academy)
- Nolan Green (Army West Point)
- Donovan Law (Life University)
- Andre Greenup (McKendree University)
