= Rocco Mauer =

- Born: January 1, 1988 (age 38) Cleveland, Ohio, United States
- Height: 6 ft 1 in (1.85 m)
- Weight: 197 lb (89 kg)
- University: Bowling Green

Rugby union career
Senior career
Years	Team	Apps	(Points)
–	Chicago Lions		
2014	Old Puget Sound Beach		
National sevens team
Years	Team		Comps
2011–2013	United States		6
- Correct as of 17 February 2021

Rocco Mauer is former professional rugby player played for the USA Sevens rugby team on the World Rugby Sevens Series.

He was also a member of the USA Sevens team, which won bronze in the 2011 Pan American Games. He signed a full-time training contract with USA Rugby in January 2012. Mauer's ultimate goal is to play for the US national rugby sevens team at the 2016 Olympics.

Mauer had a brief stint with the Chicago Lions club before become a full-time USA player.

== College and youth career ==
Mauer is a former standout rugby player for Bowling Green and 2010 Midwest All-Star Sevens team selection. Mauer was named to Collegiate All-Americans and Collegiate All-American Sevens team in 2011. Mauer was also the tournament MVP of the inaugural 2010 Collegiate Rugby Championship, leading the tournament with 11 tries scored. Mauer graduated from Bowling Green in December 2011 with a degree in psychology and political science.

Mauer did not play rugby before college, instead he played four years of high school football and one year of college football.

== See also ==
- United States national rugby sevens team
- IRB Sevens World Series
- Collegiate Rugby Championship
