= 2014 Collegiate Rugby Championship =

Tournament details
- Tournament format(s): Round-robin and Knockout
- Date: 30 May–1 June 2014

Tournament statistics
- Teams: 20
- Matches played: 46

Final
- Venue: PPL Park, Philadelphia
- Champions: California (2nd title)
- Runners-up: Kutztown

The 2014 USA Sevens Collegiate Rugby Championship was a rugby sevens tournament. The tournament was held on May 30 — June 1 at PPL Park in Chester, Pennsylvania. It was the fifth annual Collegiate Rugby Championship, and the fourth consecutive year that the tournament is held at PPL Park. California defeated Kutztown 24-21 in the final to secure the CRC Championship for the second year in a row. Penn State defeated Ohio state in the women's final for their second consecutive win as well.

== Pool stage ==
Team qualified for the Cup Championship

=== Pool A ===
Team	Pld	W	D	L	PF	PA	+/-	Pts
California	3	3	0	0	112	19	+93	9
Maryland	3	2	0	1	50	45	+5	7
Drexel	3	1	0	2	12	69	-57	5
Temple	3	0	0	3	26	67	-41	3

=== Pool B ===
Team	Pld	W	D	L	PF	PA	+/-	Pts
Kutztown	3	2	1	0	87	31	+56	8
Dartmouth	3	2	1	0	54	36	+18	8
Saint Joseph's	3	1	0	2	39	89	-50	5
Notre Dame	3	0	0	3	50	74	-24	3

=== Pool C ===
Team	Pld	W	D	L	PF	PA	+/-	Pts
Michigan	3	3	0	0	67	34	+33	9
Navy	3	2	0	1	72	34	+38	7
Ohio State	3	1	0	2	36	59	-23	5
Texas	3	0	0	3	22	70	-48	3

=== Pool D ===
Team	Pld	W	D	L	PF	PA	+/-	Pts
UCLA	3	3	0	0	73	12	+61	9
Penn State	3	2	0	1	49	12	+37	7
Northeastern	3	1	0	2	44	72	-28	5
South Carolina	3	0	0	3	19	89	-70	3

=== Pool E ===
Team	Pld	W	D	L	PF	PA	+/-	Pts
Life	3	3	0	0	85	0	+85	9
Virginia Tech	3	2	0	1	63	31	+32	7
Arizona	3	1	0	2	19	61	-42	5
Penn	3	0	0	3	12	87	-75	3

== Knockout stage ==
=== Shield ===
Semifinals
17	Temple	21
20	Penn	12
18	Texas	15
19	South Carolina	10

Finals
17	Temple	17
18	Texas	12

=== Bowl ===
Semifinals
13	Arizona	10
16	Notre Dame	14
14	Saint Joseph's	17
15	Drexel	5

Finals
16	Notre Dame	15
14	Saint Joseph's	17

=== Plate ===
Semifinals
9	Virginia Tech	10
12	Northeastern	20
10	Maryland	22
11	Ohio State	5

Finals
12	Northeastern	0
10	Maryland	31

=== Cup ===
Quarterfinals
1	California	34
8	Penn State	5
3	UCLA	21
6	Dartmouth	12
4	Michigan	0
5	Kutztown	14
2	Life	29
7	Navy	26

Semifinals
1	California	20
3	UCLA	17
5	Kutztown	19
2	Life	17

Finals
1	California	24
5	Kutztown	21
