= 2016 Collegiate Rugby Championship =

Tournament details
- Countries: United States
- Tournament format(s): Round-robin and Knockout
- Date: June 4–5, 2016

Tournament statistics
- Teams: 24
- Attendance: 27,224

Final
- Venue: Talen Energy Stadium, Chester, Pennsylvania
- Champions: California (4th title)
- Runners-up: UCLA

The 2016 Collegiate Rugby Championship is a college rugby sevens tournament played June 4–5 at Talen Energy Stadium in Chester, Pennsylvania, a suburb of Philadelphia. It is the seventh annual Collegiate Rugby Championship, and the sixth consecutive year that the tournament will be at Talen Energy Stadium (formerly known as PPL Park). The event was broadcast on NBC and NBCSN. Commentators were Todd Harris and Brian Hightower. California won the championship, defeating UCLA 31–7 in an all-Pac-12 final. Attendance for the two-day event was 27,224.

== Pool stage ==
Team qualified for the Cup Championship

=== Pool A ===
Team	Pld	W	D	L	PF	PA	+/-	Pts
California	3	3	0	0	96	12	+84	9
Arkansas State	3	2	0	1	76	24	+57	7
Maryland	3	1	0	2	22	69	–52	5
Tennessee	3	0	0	3	14	103	–89	3

Winner	Score	Loser
Arkansas State	24–0	Maryland
California	41–0	Tennessee
Arkansas State	40–0	Tennessee
California	29–0	Maryland
Maryland	22–14	Tennessee
California	24–12	Arkansas State

=== Pool B ===
Team	Pld	W	D	L	PF	PA	+/-	Pts
Kutztown	3	3	0	0	58	34	+24	9
Indiana	3	1	0	2	46	45	+1	5
Notre Dame	3	1	0	2	43	55	–12	5
Boston College	3	1	0	2	45	58	–13	5

Winner	Score	Loser
Boston College	21–12	Indiana
Kutztown	19–12	Notre Dame
Indiana	22–7	Notre Dame
Kutztown	22–10	Boston College
Notre Dame	24-12	Boston College
Kutztown	17–12	Indiana

=== Pool C ===
Team	Pld	W	D	L	PF	PA	+/-	Pts
Arizona	3	3	0	0	51	5	+46	9
Saint Joseph's	3	2	0	1	52	31	+21	7
Army	3	1	0	2	26	55	–29	5
Navy	3	0	0	3	22	60	–38	3

Winner	Score	Loser
Arizona	20–0	Army
St. Joseph's	22–12	Navy
Arizona	17–0	Navy
St. Joseph's	25–5	Army
Arizona	14–5	St. Joseph's
Army	21-10	Navy

=== Pool D ===
Team	Pld	W	D	L	PF	PA	+/-	Pts
Life	3	2	0	1	68	14	+54	7
Penn State	3	2	0	1	63	41	+22	7
Virginia Tech	3	2	0	1	43	41	+2	7
Drexel	3	0	0	3	19	97	–77	3

Winner	Score	Loser
Life	46–0	Drexel
Penn State	29–12	Virginia Tech
Virginia Tech	7–5	Life
Penn State	27–12	Drexel
Virginia Tech	24–7	Drexel
Life	17–7	Penn State

=== Pool E ===
Team	Pld	W	D	L	PF	PA	+/-	Pts
UCLA	3	3	0	0	95	7	+88	9
Wisconsin	3	2	0	1	55	43	+12	7
South Carolina	3	1	0	2	24	53	–29	5
Michigan	3	0	0	3	5	76	–71	3

Winner	Score	Loser
South Carolina	12–5	Michigan
UCLA	38–0	Wisconsin
Wisconsin	29–5	South Carolina
UCLA	38–0	Michigan
Wisconsin	26–0	Michigan
UCLA	19–7	South Carolina

=== Pool F ===
Team	Pld	W	D	L	PF	PA	+/-	Pts
Dartmouth	3	3	0	0	57	34	+23	9
Utah	3	2	0	1	48	40	+8	7
Temple	3	1	0	2	38	50	–12	5
Clemson	3	0	0	3	33	52	–19	3

Winner	Score	Loser
Dartmouth	17–5	Temple
Utah	12–7	Clemson
Dartmouth	21–14	Clemson
Utah	21–14	Temple
Temple	19–12	Clemson
Dartmouth	19–15	Utah

== Knockout stage ==
=== Bowl ===
Quarterfinals
17	Army	36
24	Tennessee	0
20	Clemson	10
21	Navy	5
19	Boston College	21
22	Michigan	0
18	Maryland	24
23	Drexel	0

Semifinals
17	Army	28
20	Clemson	7
19	Boston College	12
18	Maryland	15

Finals
17	Army	10
18	Maryland	0

=== Plate ===
Quarterfinals
9	Saint Joseph's	12
16	South Carolina	19
12	Virginia Tech	7
13	Indiana	31
11	Utah	5
14	Notre Dame	0
10	Wisconsin	33
15	Temple	0

Semifinals
16	South Carolina	7
13	Indiana	25
11	Utah	12
10	Wisconsin	17

Finals
13	Indiana	7
10	Wisconsin	10

=== Cup ===
Quarterfinals
1	UCLA	19
8	Penn State	12
4	Kutztown	19
5	Dartmouth	12
3	Arizona	17
6	Life	12
2	California	24
7	Arkansas State	14

Semifinals
1	UCLA	14
4	Kutztown	12
3	Arizona	5
2	California	38

Finals
1	UCLA	7
2	California	31

== Players ==
Most tries
Rank	Player (school)	Tries
1	Niall Barry (UCLA)	6
2	Jesse Milne (California)	5
2	Seb Sharpe (UCLA)	5
2	Zinzan Elan-Puttick (Ark. St.)	5
2	Tyler Sousley (Arizona)	5
2	Jake Syndergaard (Wisconsin)	5

=== Dream Team ===
1. Jesse Milne (California) — Tournament MVP
2. Russell Webb (California)
3. Niall Barry (UCLA)
4. Seb Sharpe (UCLA)
5. Tyler Sousley (Arizona)
6. Wes Hartmann (Kutztown)
7. Zinzan Elan-Puttick (Arkansas State)
8. Cody Melphy (Life)
9. Jack Braun (Dartmouth)
10. Jake Syndergaard (Wisconsin)
11. Chad Gough (Utah)
12. Evan Towle (Virginia Tech)
