= 2019 Collegiate Rugby Championship =

Tournament details
- Countries: United States
- Tournament format(s): Round-robin and Knockout
- Date: May 31 – June 2, 2019

Tournament statistics
- Teams: 24
- Attendance: 27,587

Final
- Venue: Talen Energy Stadium, Chester, Pennsylvania
- Champions: Lindenwood (2nd title)
- Runners-up: Life Running Eagles

The 2019 Collegiate Rugby Championship was a college rugby sevens tournament played May 31 to June 2 at Talen Energy Stadium in Chester, Pennsylvania, a suburb of Philadelphia. It was the tenth annual Collegiate Rugby Championship, and the ninth consecutive year that the tournament was at Talen Energy Stadium (formerly known as PPL Park). The event was broadcast on ESPN+, ESPN2 and ESPNews. The men's competition consisted of 24 teams split into six pools. Lindenwood claimed their second consecutive title in only their third appearance in the tournament, defeating Life University in the men's final, 21–12.

== Pool stage ==
Team qualified for the Cup Championship

=== Pool A ===
Team
Lindenwood
Clemson
Virginia Tech
Temple

=== Pool B ===
Team
UCLA
Penn State
St. Bonaventure
Notre Dame

=== Pool C ===
Team
Life Running Eagles
California Golden Bears
University of Indiana
University of Colorado Denver

=== Pool D ===
Team
Iona College
Kutztown
Wisconsin
Boston College

=== Pool E ===
Team
Saint Mary's
University of Arizona
St. Joseph's
Fordham

=== Pool F ===
Team
Navy
Dartmouth College
Army
University South Carolina

== Knockout stage ==
=== Bowl ===
Finals
St. Bonaventure	15
Notre Dame	12

=== Plate ===
Finals
California	50
Clemson	0

=== Cup ===
Quarterfinals
1	St. Mary's	19
8	Kutztown	24
5	Iona College	7
4	Lindenwood	19
6	UCLA	7
3	Life	33
2	Navy	21
7	Penn State	12

Semifinals
8	Kutztown	12
4	Lindenwood	30
3	Life	19
2	Navy	5

Finals
4	Lindenwood	21
3	Life	12

== Women's D1 final ==
Lindenwood 34 – 12 Army

== Players ==
=== Most Valuable Player ===
Wesley White

== Freedom Cup ==
With their 2019 Freedom Cup victory, Harvard qualified for the CRC Championship top division in 2020.

Finals
Harvard	26
Rowan	12
