= 2017 Collegiate Rugby Championship =

Tournament details
- Countries: United States
- Tournament format(s): Round-robin and Knockout
- Date: June 3–4, 2017

Tournament statistics
- Teams: 24
- Attendance: 37,518

Final
- Venue: Talen Energy Stadium, Chester, Pennsylvania
- Champions: California (5th title)
- Runners-up: Life Running Eagles

The 2017 Collegiate Rugby Championship was a college rugby sevens tournament played June 3–4 at Talen Energy Stadium in Chester, Pennsylvania, a suburb of Philadelphia. It was the eighth annual Collegiate Rugby Championship, and the seventh consecutive year that the tournament was at Talen Energy Stadium (formerly known as PPL Park). The 2017 championship broke the event's two-day attendance record with 37,518 on hand. It also set the tournament record for a one-day attendance with 14,973 on Saturday. The event was broadcast on NBC and NBCSN. California won the championship.

== Pool stage ==
Team qualified for the Cup Championship

=== Pool A ===
Team	Pld	W	D	L	PF	PA	+/-	Pts
Saint Mary's	3	3	0	0	86	19	+67	9
Dartmouth	3	2	0	1	62	45	+17	7
Boston College	3	1	0	2	55	45	+10	5
Temple	3	0	0	3	0	94	-94	3

Winner	Score	Loser
Saint Mary's	26–7	Dartmouth
Boston College	24–0	Temple
Dartmouth	26–19	Boston College
Saint Mary's	41–0	Temple
Dartmouth	29–0	Temple
Saint Mary's	19–12	Boston College

=== Pool B ===
Team	Pld	W	D	L	PF	PA	+/-	Pts
Arkansas State	3	2	1	0	62	38	+24	8
Life	3	2	1	0	67	48	+19	8
Wisconsin	3	1	0	2	64	50	+14	5
Notre Dame	3	0	0	3	19	76	–57	3

Winner	Score	Loser
Wisconsin	35–0	Notre Dame
Arkansas State	19–19*	Life (Tie)*
Life	29–17	Wisconsin
Arkansas State	27–7	Notre Dame
Life	19-12	Notre Dame
Arkansas State	21–12	Wisconsin

=== Pool C ===
Team	Pld	W	D	L	PF	PA	+/-	Pts
Lindenwood	3	3	0	0	86	26	+60	9
Army	3	2	0	1	48	57	-9	7
Saint Joseph's	3	1	0	2	39	63	–24	5
Navy	3	0	0	3	31	58	–27	3

Winner	Score	Loser
Army	17–14	Navy
Lindenwood	24–7	Navy
St. Joseph's	17–10	Navy
Army	24–10	St. Joseph's
Lindenwood	29–12	St. Joseph's
Lindenwood	33-7	Army

=== Pool D ===
Team	Pld	W	D	L	PF	PA	+/-	Pts
UCLA	3	2	1	0	62	31	+31	8
AIC	3	1	2	0	43	38	+5	7
Arizona	3	1	0	2	50	34	+16	5
Virginia Tech	3	0	1	2	17	69	–52	4

Winner	Score	Loser
UCLA	17–12	Arizona
AIC	12–12*	Virginia Tech (Tie)*
Arizona	31–5	Virginia Tech
UCLA	19–19*	AIC (Tie)*
AIC	12–7	Arizona
UCLA	26–0	Virginia Tech

=== Pool E ===
Team	Pld	W	D	L	PF	PA	+/-	Pts
California	3	3	0	0	115	31	+84	9
Penn State	3	2	0	1	81	35	+46	7
Clemson	3	1	0	2	39	76	–37	5
Delaware	3	0	0	3	12	105	–93	3

Winner	Score	Loser
California	54–0	Delaware
Penn State	31–7	Clemson
California	28–19	Penn State
Clemson	20–12	Delaware
California	33–12	Clemson
Penn State	31–0	Daleware

=== Pool F ===
Team	Pld	W	D	L	PF	PA	+/-	Pts
Indiana	3	3	0	0	78	26	+52	9
Kutztown	3	2	0	1	104	29	+75	7
South Carolina	3	1	0	2	21	61	–40	5
Tennessee	3	0	0	3	10	97	–87	3

Winner	Score	Loser
Indiana	29–19	Kutztown
South Carolina	14–10	Tennessee
Kutztown	49–0	Tennessee
Indiana	34–0	Tennessee
Kutztown	36–0	South Carolina
Indiana	15–7	South Carolina

== Knockout stage ==
=== Bowl ===
Quarterfinals
17	Clemson	14
24	Temple	12
20	Navy	26
21	Notre Dame	0
19	South Carolina	19
22	Delaware	7
18	Virginia Tech	20
23	Tennessee	5

Semifinals
17	Clemson	17
20	Navy	12
19	South Carolina	12
18	Virginia Tech	0

Finals
17	Clemson	17
18	South Carolina	24

=== Plate ===
Quarterfinals
9	Penn State	14
16	Saint Joseph's	21
12	Army	14
13	Wisconsin	19
11	Dartmouth	10
14	Boston College	5
10	AIC	17
15	Arizona	14

Semifinals
16	Saint Joseph's	5
13	Wisconsin	15
11	Dartmouth	26
10	AIC	21

Finals
13	Wisconsin	12
11	Dartmouth	10

=== Cup ===
Quarterfinals
1	California	19
8	Kutztown	10
4	Indiana	24
5	UCLA	12
6	Saint Mary's	5
3	Life	7
2	Lindenwood	12
7	Arkansas State	0

Semifinals
1	California	29
4	Indiana	14
3	Life	24
2	Lindenwood	14

Finals
1	California	19
3	Life	0

== Players ==
=== Most Valuable Player ===
- Sam Cusano (California)

=== Dream Team ===
1. Cian Barry (UCLA)
2. Dylan Boast (Arkansas State)
3. Harley Davidson (Life)
4. Alex Dorrier (Indiana)
5. Cody Melphy (Life)
6. Dmontae Noble (Kutztown)
7. Cristian Rodriguez (Lindenwood)
8. Anthony Salaber (California)
9. Lorenzo Thomas (Lindenwood)
10. Duncan van Schalkwyk (Life)
11. Russell Webb (California)
12. Dawit Workie (Dartmouth)
