= Peter Tiberio =

US international rugby union player

- Born: April 26, 1989 (age 37) New York, United States
- Height: 5 ft 11 in (1.80 m)
- Weight: 181 lb (82 kg)
- University: University of Arizona

Rugby union career
- Position: Wing
- Current team: Seattle Seawolves
Senior career
Years	Team	Apps	(Points)
2018–	Seattle Seawolves	19	(20)
International career
Years	Team	Apps	(Points)
2009	United States U20	4	(0)
2017	United States	1	(5)
- Correct as of 15 February 2017
National sevens team
Years	Team		Comps
2011–2016	United States		13

Peter Tiberio (born April 26, 1989) is an American rugby union player who plays for the Seattle Seawolves in Major League Rugby (MLR).

At 5'11", 180 lbs, he plays wing for the United States national rugby sevens team and has represented the United States in the IRB Sevens World Series. Tiberio first represented the U.S. in the IRB Sevens circuit at the Hong Kong Sevens in March 2011. Tiberio also represented the United States at the 2011 Pan American Games, where Tiberio and his teammates earned a bronze medal.

== College & youth career ==
Tiberio first rose to national prominence in his college playing days with the University of Arizona Wildcats, even though he did not take up the sport of rugby until he was a freshman in college. Tiberio was named to the All-American team three years in a row. Rugby Mag named Tiberio as its 2011 College 7s Player of the Year. Tiberio starred for Arizona during the 2011 Collegiate Rugby Championship, which was broadcast live on NBC. Tiberio led all players with eight tries scored in that tournament, and was named to the All Tournament Team.

Tiberio played center for the United States at the 2009 IRB Junior World Rugby Trophy competition in Nairobi, Kenya.

== See also ==
- United States national rugby sevens team
- IRB Sevens World Series
- Collegiate Rugby Championship
- United States national under-20 rugby union team
