= Seamus Kelly (rugby union, born 1991) =

US international rugby union player

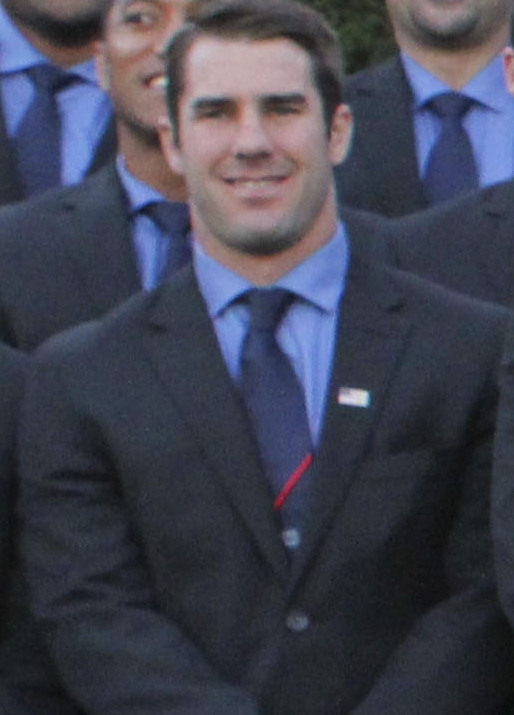
- Kelly with the USA Eagles in October 2015
- Born: 30 May 1991 (age 35) New York City, United States
- Height: 1.81 m (5 ft 11 in)
- Weight: 92 kg (14 st 7 lb)

Rugby union career
- Position: Centre
- Current team: Rugby United New York
Amateur team(s)
Years	Team	Apps	(Points)
2005–2009	Xavier High School		
2009–2014	California Golden Bears		
2015	SFGG		
Senior career
Years	Team	Apps	(Points)
2014	Gloucester	0	(0)
2019	Rugby United New York		
International career
Years	Team	Apps	(Points)
2011	USA U-20s		
2013–2015	United States	23	(5)
- Correct as of 11 October 2015

Seamus Kelly (born 30 May 1991) is a former American rugby union player who played outside centre for the United States national team.

Kelly previously played for San Francisco Golden Gate RFC. He debuted for the U.S. national team at the age of 21 on May 25, 2013, coming on as a substitute against Canada during the 2013 Pacific Nations Cup. He made his first start for the U.S. on 8 June 2013 against Ireland. During the 2013 Pacific Nations Cup, Kelly played in four matches, two as a starter and two as a sub.

== Early career ==
Kelly is from Queens, New York, where he attended Xavier High School. At Xavier he was also a standout running back in American football, earning the nickname "Famous Seamus". A number of universities were interested in recruiting Kelly to play American football. Kelly graduated from Xavier High School in 2009.

Kelly played college rugby with the University of California under coach Jack Clark. Kelly won two national championships during his years at Cal. Kelly played with Cal in the Collegiate Rugby Championship, and was named to the CRC All-Tournament team in 2010 and 2013. In 2013, Kelly captained Cal to a CRC championship win, earning tournament MVP honors. Kelly was named a Collegiate All-American four times.

== Professional career ==
Kelly has stated that his goal after college is to play rugby professionally overseas. In September 2014 Kelly earned a one-month trial with Gloucester with the view to gaining a full-time contract. After failing to gain a contract with Gloucester, Kelly joined SFGG for the 2015 Pacific Rugby Premiership season.

== See also ==
- California Golden Bears rugby
- United States national rugby union team
