= Lady Ruggers =

USA
- Union: Mid-Atlantic Rugby Football Union
- Nickname(s): Penn State Nittany Lions or Lady Ruggers
- Emblem(s): Nittany Lion
- Region: State College, Pennsylvania
- Ground(s): West Campus Rugby Pitch (Capacity: 50 Seats 200 Standing)
- Coach(es): Kate Daley
- League(s): EPRU
- Division 1

Official website
- gopsusports.com/sports/womens-rugby

The Lady Ruggers are Penn State University's (PSU) Women's Rugby Football Club sports team, established in 1991. They are a Division 1 Elite rugby team who play under USA Rugby, American rugby's governing body. Although they are an official PSU team the women's rugby program at PSU is not funded as a varsity sport and therefore cannot be officially called the "Nittany Lions". The team is part of the Penn State athletic department's "team sports" program and plays other school's varsity teams.

The Rugby Alumni Association, which supports the team, also works with the Penn State's men's rugby team.

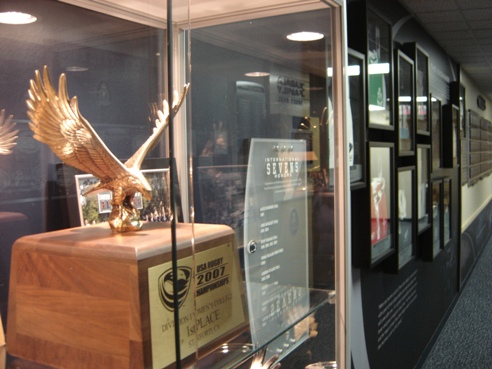
Kabala Rugby Hall 1 of 4 walls including the 2007 National Championship Trophy, Traded International Jerseys and All-America Plaques

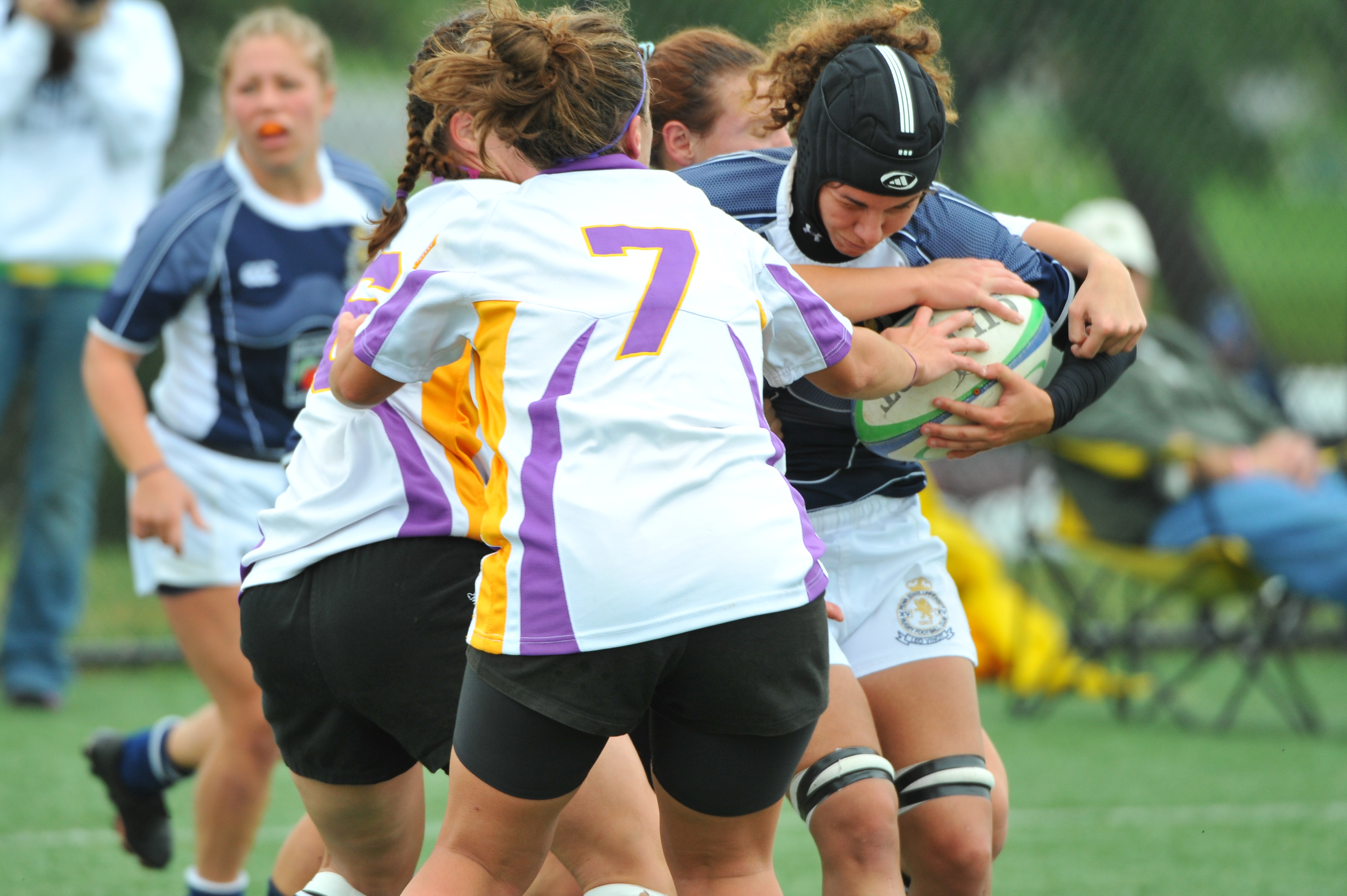
Penn State Lock Nichole F. Lopes '07 & '09 Vs West Chester Oct. 2008 at Penn State West Pitch

== Division I National Final Four Appearances (15s) ==
- 1993 – 3rd Place
- 1994 – 3rd Place
- 1995 – 2nd Place (Princeton def. Penn State)
- 1996 – 2nd Place (Princeton def. Penn State)
- 1997 – National Champions (Runner-up Radcliffe)
- 1998 – 2nd Place (Radcliffe def. Penn State)
- 2000 – National Champions (Runner-up Princeton)
- 2001 – 2nd Place (Chico State def. Penn State)
- 2002 – 2nd Place (Air Force def. Penn State)
- 2003 – 3rd Place
- 2004 – National Champions (Runner-up Princeton)
- 2005 – 2nd Place (Stanford 53 Penn State 6)
- 2006 – 2nd Place (Stanford 15 Penn State 12)
- 2007 – National Champions (Penn State 22 Stanford 21)
- 2008 – 2nd Place (Stanford 15 Penn State 10)
- 2009 – National Champions (Penn State 46 Stanford 7)
- 2010 – National Champions (Penn State 24 Stanford 7)
- 2011 – 2nd Place (Army 33 Penn State 29)
- 2012 – National Champions (Penn State 46 Stanford 15)
- 2013 – National Champions (Penn State 65 Norwich 10)
- 2014 – National Champions (Penn State 38 Stanford 0)
- 2015 – National Champions (Penn State 61 Central Washington 7)
- 2016 – National Champions (Penn State 15 Brigham Young 5)
- 2017 – National Champions (Penn State 28 Lindenwood 25)
- 2018 – lost semifinal game
- 2019 – lost semifinal game
- 2020 – cancelled (pandemic)
- 2021 – did not compete (pandemic)
- 2022 (spring) – lost semifinal game
- 2022 (fall) – withdrew after qualifying for semifinal game

National championship winners

Division I
Year and Champion	Year and Champion	Year and Champion	Year and Champion
1991 Air Force	1998 Harvard-Radcliffe	2005 Stanford	2012 Penn State
1992 Boston College	1999 Stanford	2006 Stanford	2013 Penn State
1993 Connecticut	2000 Penn State	2007 Penn State	2014 Penn State
1994 Air Force	2001 Chico State (CA)	2008 Stanford	2015 Penn State
1995 Princeton	2002 Air Force	2009 Penn State	Div I Elite established
1996 Princeton	2003 Air Force	2010 Penn State	Div I Elite established
1997 Penn State	2004 Penn State	2011 Army	Div I Elite established

Year	Division I Elite Result
2016	Penn State 15, Brigham Young 5
2017	Penn State 28, Lindenwood 25

== Rugby Sevens Collegiate Championships ==
Collegiate Rugby Championship

2011- 2nd Place (Penn State 5 Army 14)

Year	Champion
2011	Army
2012	not held
2013	Penn State
2014	Penn State
2015	Penn State
2016	Life University
2017	Life University
2018	Lindenwood 21–12 Penn State

USA Rugby Sevens Collegiate National Championships

In the first three years, the tournament was held in December, and the location necessitated considerable travel costs. Because of the impact on their programs, strong teams that won bids declined to participate.

Year	Champion
2011	did not participate
2012	did not participate
2013	lost Semi-Final to Norwich 17-5 Penn State
2014	shifted from fall to spring
2015	Penn State
2016	Life University
2017	Lindenwood
2018	Lindenwood 20–0 Penn State

== Captains ==
Captains are selected by team members. To qualify to vote, a player must have played with the team for at least one semester at the time of the vote. Coaching staff have no vote. A captain's term lasts one semester, but she can be reelected multiple times.

- Fall 2001 - Claudia Braymer '02, Scrumhalf
- Spring 2002 - Claudia Braymer '02, Scrumhalf
- Spring 2004 - Kim Magrini '04, Scrumhalf
- Fall 2004 - Maggie Reed '05, 2nd Row, 8, & Flanker
- Spring 2005 - Maggie Reed '05, 2nd Row, 8, & Flanker
- Fall 2005 - Amber Benlian '06, Center
- Spring 2006 - Amber Benlian '06, Center
- Fall 2006 - Diana Klein '07, Fullback
- Spring 2007 - Alison Searle '07, Lock
- Fall 2007 - Lauren Rosso '09, Outside Center
- Spring 2008 - Kristen Snyder '09, Hooker
- Fall 2008 - Annie Zeigler '10, Scrumhalf
- Spring 2009 - Kristen Snyder '09, Hooker
- Fall 2009 - Ann Blair '09, Wing
- Spring 2010 - R. Smyers '10, Lock
- Fall 2010 - Sadie Anderson '12, Flyhalf
- Spring 2011 - Kyle Armstrong '12, Lock
- Fall 2011 - Sadie Anderson '12, Flyhalf
- ?
- Spring 2021 - Ellie Fromstein and Mia Lancellotti
