= Notre Dame Rugby Football Club =

Notre Dame
- Full name: Notre Dame Rugby Football Club
- Union: Midwest Rugby Football Union/ NCR D1
- Founded: 1961; 65 years ago
- Ground: Stinson Rugby Field
- President: Daniel Palmer
- Coach: Justin Hickey
1st kit	2nd kit

Official website
- rugby.nd.edu

The Notre Dame Rugby Football Club is the official rugby football club at the University of Notre Dame. It is the oldest collegiate rugby club in the Midwest and currently plays in the National Collegiate Rugby (NCR) D1, one of the highest levels of college rugby in the U.S.

== History ==
=== Founding and early years ===
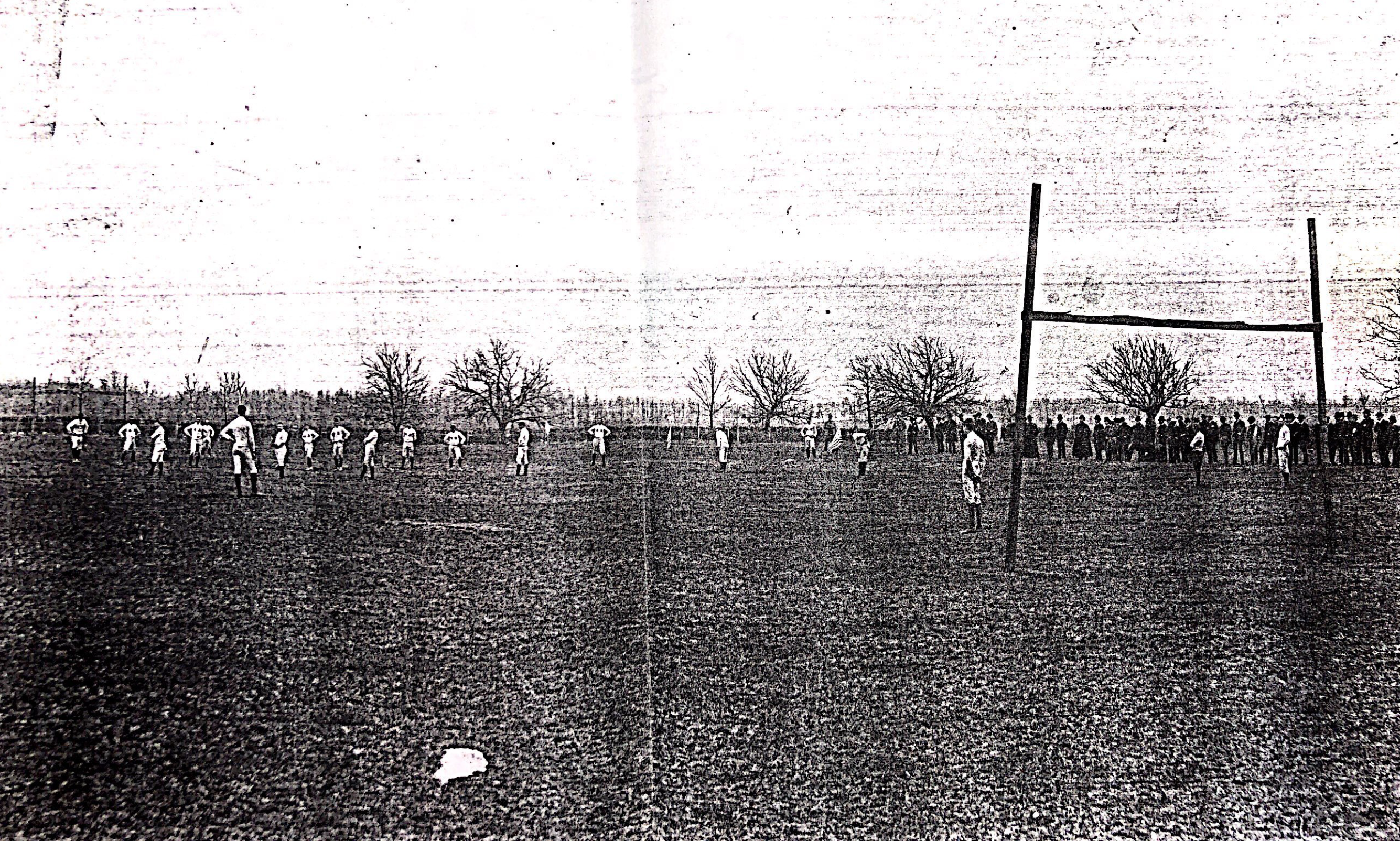
Early rugby match at Notre Dame circa 1890s. Location is likely Carter field. Uniforms look like the ones worn by the first football team

Evidence of rugby matches being played at Notre Dame's Carter Field date back to the 1890s marking the sports origin at the university contemporaneous to that of the university's football team. The modern Notre Dame Rugby Football Club was founded in 1961 as one of the first collegiate rugby clubs in the Midwest. In the spring of 1962, Notre Dame narrowly defeated Wisconsin in the first club rugby match played in the Midwest.

In 1963, the Notre Dame Rugby Football Club was officially founded as a club sport. The team was founded by Bob Mier, a student who participated in the Wisconsin game the previous spring. With supervising faculty member and acting head coach Kenneth Featherstone, the team formed and competed in the Midwest Conference.

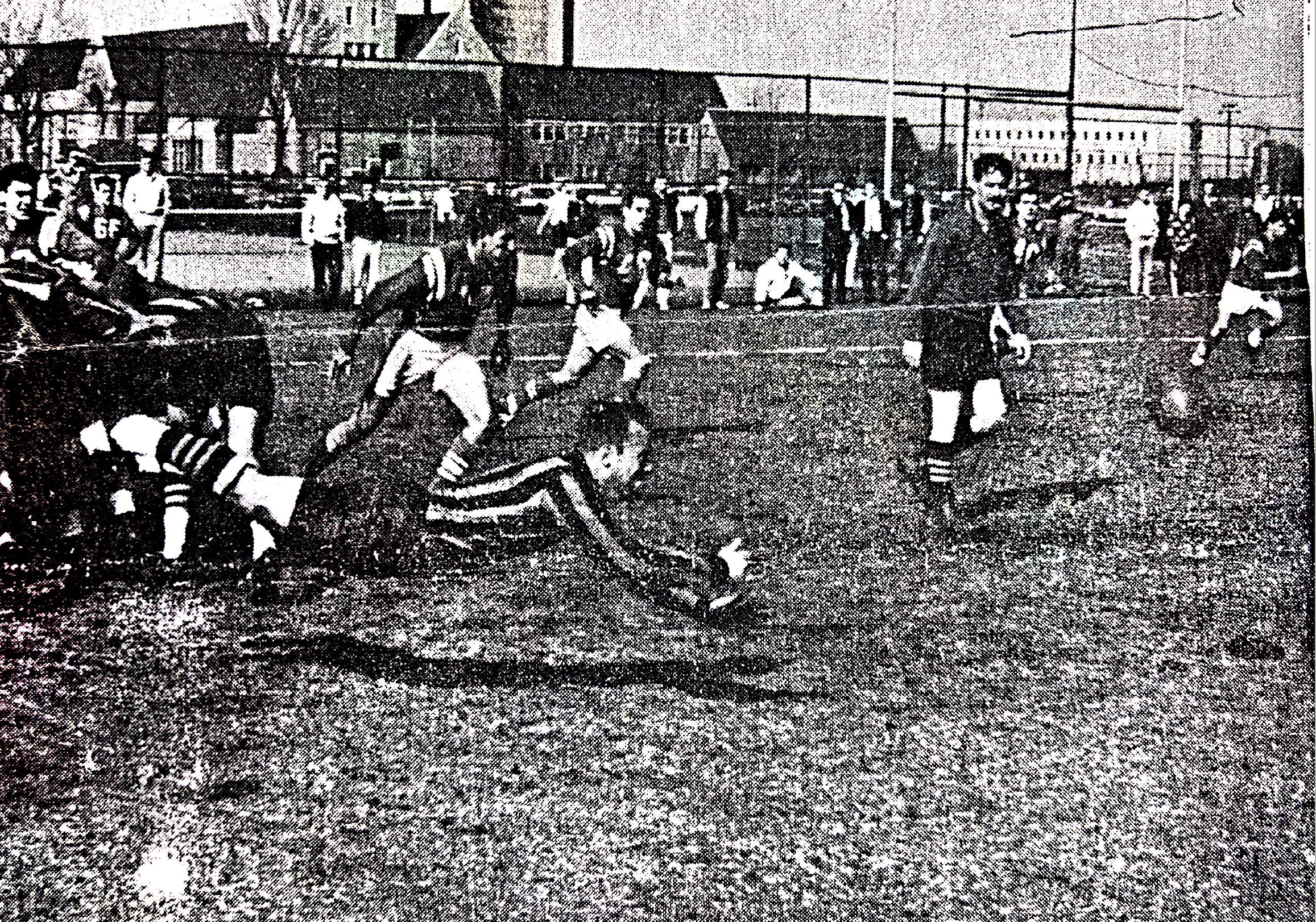
Captain Bob Mier passing the ball to fly-half Buzz Breen (not pictured) to start an offensive charge for the Irish

In April 1968, the Fighting Irish, chaperoned by Professor Peter Brady, traveled to Ireland for several exhibition matches. They went 2–3 against Irish teams, including losses to the Dublin League Champions, Navan, and runner-up, Delvin. Notre Dame was also defeated by University College Cork but gained victories over the Limerick Rovers and Thurles. The Fighting Irish traveled to Ireland again in March 1974. On this trip, Notre Dame went 2-2, losing to Tralee and again to University College Cork while defeating another Limerick team, the Bohemians, and University College Dublin.

=== National prominence ===
After suffering a losing record their first season, the A-side went on to have 3 winning seasons obtaining a 53–12 record. Likewise, the B-side also dominated its opposition obtaining a 40–1 record that included a 33-game winning streak which was finally ended by former SuperLeague side, the Chicago Lions.

During the 1965-1966 year, the Fighting Irish won the Commonwealth Cup, Nassau Invitational, Midwest Tournament, Irish Challenge Cup, and the All-College Tournament. These wins resulted in the Fighting Irish being named Collegiate Rugby National Champions by Sports Illustrated. After this season, Notre Dame offered the rugby team the chance to become a varsity sport, but this was turned down via players' vote. Notre Dame was even named a "national rugby power" by the Washington Post.

In the fall season of 1972, the Fighting Irish defeated longtime rival, the Chicago Lions 15–12, upsetting the 1972 Midwest Champs. The game has been considered one of the most brutal matches in recent years. One player was knocked unconscious in the first minute of play with two others being removed at half-time, one with a broken jaw and the other with a broken leg. An English official said afterwards, "I've seen teams play in Holland, England, and on the continent (Europe), but I've never seen a team hit like Notre Dame did that day." The next week, Notre Dame won a hard-fought victory over rival and defending National Champions Palmer College of Chiropractic 16–15. The Irish finished the fall season at 11–2. During the spring season of 1973, Notre Dame beat rival Ohio State and reclaimed the Silver Cup, a trophy passed to the victor of that game. The Fighting Irish finished the spring at 12–1, winning the Midwest Championship over the Chicago Lions, but losing the National Championship to repeat champions, Palmer. The 1975 B-Team went undefeated included a 3–0 victory over the Lions in their final game on Mark Keown's 30 yard penalty kick from the right sideline.

The team was suspended by the university for violations of the code of conduct and not reinstated until the early 1980s.

From 1985 to 1992 the Irish returned to regional prowess, under the coaching of Art Maerlender winning or placing in the IPRU tournament in 1985, 86, 87, 88 and 89. The 1987–88 team had a combined fall and spring record of 16–2. The team joined the Chicago Area Rugby Football Union in 1990 and made it to the Midwest final round in each year from 1990 through 1994. The late Col. John Stephens was the long-serving faculty advisor who died in 1996. Incidents the next year invoked the "double-secret probation," that resulted in the club's banishment from campus.

=== Behavioral incidents ===
The university placed the rugby club on probation twice in the 1980s as a result of bad behavior. The combined weight of these events and inexcusable misconduct during the 1995 spring season ultimately led to the club's disbandment on August 3, 1995.

=== South Bend Old Boys RFC ===
Tom McGinty, Dave Bishop, and John Friskel started a club team in the fall of 2000, eventually dubbed the South Bend Old Boys RFC, after playing for the South Bend blues the previous year and longing for a university-affiliated team. This club was successful over the next three years at scheduling matches with high-profile teams like Michigan, Michigan State, and Tennessee.

They were also a frequent supporting club carpooling to away games.

=== Out Side Irish ===
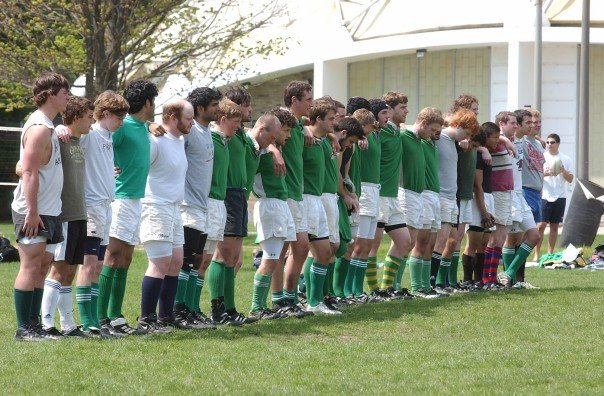
The Out Side Irish during the 2007 Spring season

The OIRFC was a rugby club that was unaffiliated with the University of Notre Dame but was composed of Notre Dame and Indiana University of South Bend students. The club was founded in the fall of 2004 by junior, Mike Schmitt and sophomore, Don Greiwe as an attempt to take the team in a more serious direction. In their first season the Out Side Irish only managed to schedule a few games due to low numbers and accessibility. They practiced only once per week and barely could scrap together fifteen live bodies to play matches, however they were able to recruit a strong freshman class and the next spring managed a record of 3–4.

=== Reinstatement (2007) ===
At the end of the 2006 season John Gallagher, Christopher Liedl, and Chris Harrington put together a formal application for club status with the university. After drafting a club constitution, and with the support of president Don Greiwe and vice president Brian Fallon, the club filed for official recognition. Practicing three times a week and posting a record of 9–1–1 the rugby club made a strong case for itself. With the support of numerous alumni and donors and after an application period of over six months the team was recognized in May 2007 and became the Notre Dame Rugby Football Club.

On May 18, 2007, 12 years after being banished, the university officially reinstated the Notre Dame Rugby Football Club. As an official club, the NDRFC's goals are to field a rugby team representing the University of Notre Dame, to compete with other club teams while abiding by the rules of the University of Notre Dame, USA Rugby, and the International Rugby Board (IRB), and to promote the physical education, mental and social well-being, and sportsmanship of members of the club through participation in and the playing of rugby.

Following their reinstatement, the club rose rapidly through the Midwest RFU ranks after hiring Coach Sean O'Leary. O'Leary transferred from Northeastern University and acts as coach of the USA U17 national team. In the fall of their first season the Irish finished 8-1-1 against Division II competition, sparking a move up to Division I in the spring and an inclusion in the Eastern Division of the Midwestern Division I league.

College Premier League

The Irish continued their successful ascent into the ranks of college rugby's elite programs over the next few years. Although they struggled in their first season in Division I, under the supervision of Coach O'Leary and a strong Class of 2011, the program consistently improved, becoming a Midwest powerhouse. USA Rugby recognized this when, in 2010, they invited the NDRFC to join its inaugural College Premier Division, composed of the top 31 teams in American college rugby. As a young program, the Irish were expected to struggle in the league, yet turned heads by compiling a 3–3 record and recording wins against programs such as LSU, Oklahoma, and Tennessee. In both 2010 and 2011, forward Nick Civetta was named an All-American, while scrumhalf Andy O’Connor consistently impressed and was awarded a position on the Midwest Select Side both years. Prop John Lalor was also named to the side in 2011.

NBC Collegiate Rugby 7s Championship

Due to the admittance of rugby 7s to the 2016 Olympics, 7s began to grow quickly in the US. In June 2010, NBC broadcast the inaugural Collegiate Championship Invitational (later the Collegiate Rugby Championship). Again, Notre Dame was recognized as a top-flight program, both in its rugby talent and marketability. A young team in 2010, the 2011 Irish CRC had not lost a single player to graduation. Their cohesion showed as they battled through the tournament's “Group of Death,” competing against 2010 champion Utah and eventual 2011 champion Dartmouth, as well as Catholic rival Boston College. Two last minute tries in the Utah and Dartmouth games relegated the Irish to the Challenger Bracket, yet they persevered and beat Midwest rival Ohio State 28–7 in the quarterfinals and a strong Navy side 12–10 in the semifinals to set up a match with LSU in the Challenger Finals. The side Notre Dame opened their CPD season against with a hard-fought win were not to be denied this time, however, and pulled out a strong win over the Irish. Nevertheless, the tournament was a success for Coach O’Leary's first class, showing just how far the program had progressed in a few short years—from nonexistent to nationally televised.

== Traditions ==
=== Crest ===
The NDRFC crest was designed by Jaime Urquijo and Don Whitley following the club's reinstatement in 2007. In the center of the crest is a stylized Celtic cross, reminiscent of both Notre Dame's Irish heritage and its status as a Catholic university. Atop the arms of the cross is the club's original 1961 date of establishment. 1961 is listed instead of 2007 so as to stress the continuity between the old club and the new club and to recognize the three decades of successful history that existed prior to the club's disbandment.

At the bottom of the crest are the Notre Dame monogram and a shamrock similar to the one used on Notre Dame's basketball jerseys. These symbols reaffirm the club's strong desire to be affiliated with the university. The use of a pre-existing Notre Dame shamrock instead of the IRFU design (which was used as the club's logo when they were the Out Side Irish) or the London Irish variant (which appeared in the first versions of the crest) is particularly significant in this regard. It is also referencing the NDRFC's logo from the 1970s.

=== Jerseys ===
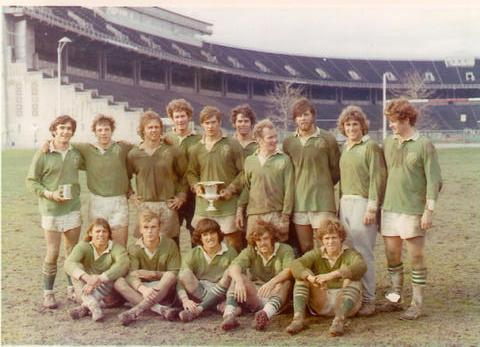
The 1973 Notre Dame Rugby team wearing green jerseys with the shamrock logo reclaiming the Silver Cup from Ohio State

While the A-Side jerseys bear the Notre Dame colors of blue and gold, the B-Side jerseys are almost identical to those used by the Out Side Irish (which were imitations of the jerseys worn by the Irish national team). The kelly green of the B-Side jersey is a tribute to both the pre-1995 Notre Dame Rugby club as well as the Out Side Irish, whose tireless dedication and perseverance led to the club's reinstatement. Additionally, it recalls the famous green jerseys used on occasion by the football team.

The two different jersey designs are intended to remind club members that it is a privilege and an honor to wear the Blue and Gold of Notre Dame - one that is only granted to someone who has earned a place on the A-Side.

=== Motto ===
- Faugh A Ballagh! (Irish: Clear the way!)

=== Rivalries ===
- Chicago Lions
- John Carroll Blue Streaks
- Purdue Boilermakers
- Michigan Wolverines
- Ball State Cardinals
- Northwestern Wildcats
- Indiana Hoosiers
- Ohio State Buckeyes
- Palmer College of Chiropractic
- Michiana RFC

== Notable alumni ==
- Nick Civetta — currently plays for the Newcastle Falcons
