= Brett Thompson (rugby union) =

US international rugby union player

- Born: August 17, 1990 (age 36) Tempe, Arizona, United States
- Height: 1.93 m (6 ft 4 in)
- Weight: 102 kg (225 lb)
- School: Marcos de Niza High School
- University: University of Arizona

Rugby union career
- Position(s): Wing, Fullback
Senior career
Years	Team	Apps	(Points)
2018	San Diego Legion	1	(0)
- Correct as of 1 January 2021
International career
Years	Team	Apps	(Points)
2009	United States U20	4	(15)
2016	USA Selects	3	(0)
2014–2015	United States	6	(5)
- Correct as of 12 December 2021
National sevens team
Years	Team		Comps
2012–2021	United States		35
- Correct as of 12 December 2021

Brett Thompson (born August 17, 1990) is an American former rugby union player. He was named in United States' squad for the 2015 Rugby World Cup. He plays as a wing or fullback in fifteens, and as a forward in sevens. He retired from professional rugby in December 2021.
