= Army Rugby Football Club =

(United States) Army Black Knights rugby
- Full name: Army Rugby Football Club
- Union: Division 1-A Rugby
- Nickname(s): Army Ruggers, Brothers XV
- Founded: 1961; 65 years ago
- Location: West Point, New York
- Ground(s): Anderson Rugby Complex, Warrior Field (Capacity: ~1,000)
- Coach: Matt Sherman
- Captain(s): Andrew Bardak, Dylan Liskey, Howard Heller, Landin Jacon-Duffy
- League(s): D1A, Eastern Conference
- National Championships: 2022 (D1A)
Team kit

Official website
- goarmywestpoint.com/sports/mens-rugby

The Army Rugby Football Club was founded in 1961 and for over 50 years the Army Black Knights have been a leader in USA Collegiate Rugby. The Army Ruggers are West Point's most successful team.

In 1980 the USA Rugby Collegiate Championship playoff system was established. Since then, the Army Rugby team has qualified for every national playoff tournament, has reached more than ten semifinals, and has finished second in the nation 3 times. In 2022, Army won the CRAA D1A National Championship.

All Cadet classes play and the team currently has over 60 members drawn from the United States Corps of Cadets fielding four rugby sides.

The Division-1 A and B sides battle for dominance in the Division 1-A Eastern division, while the C and D sides typically challenge local clubs every year.

== History ==
Army rugby plays college rugby in the Division 1–A Eastern Conference. The Black Knights play their home games at the Anderson Rugby Complex on the campus of West Point. Rugby is a relatively popular sport at West Point; for example, the 2012 game against Air Force was attended by 2,000 fans. Army is currently led by Head Coach Matt Sherman, the Cadets first full-time head coach. Sherman was an All American player at Cal, leading the Bears to 4 National Championships and was previously head coach at San Diego St and Stanford.

Army has one of the most successful college rugby teams in the country. Army played in three consecutive national championship games from 1990 to 1992. Army reached the national semi-finals four consecutive years from 2000 to 2003, and twice in a row in 2009 and 2010.

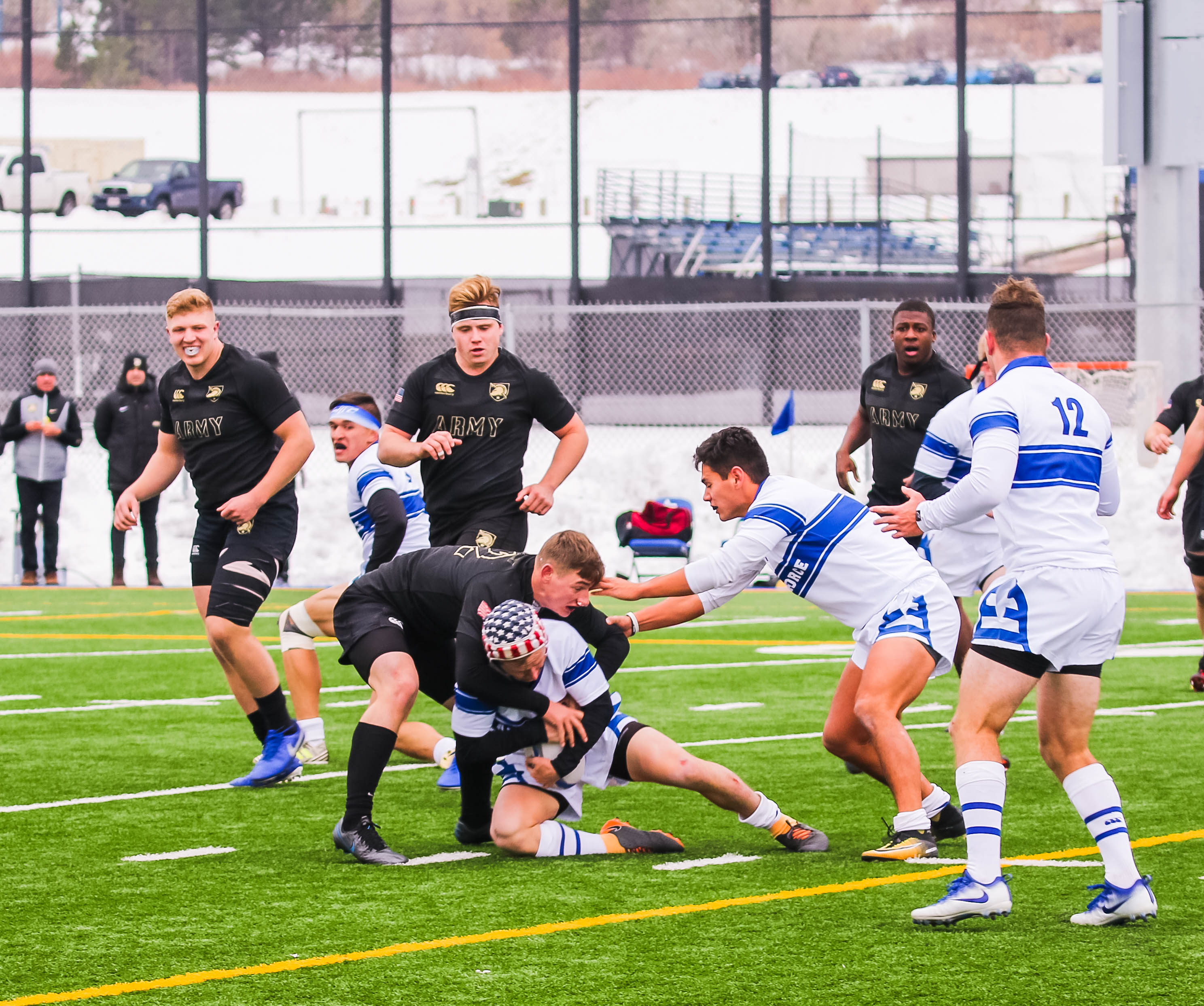
A match between Army (in black) and Air Force in 2019

Under Head Coach Rich Pohlidal, Army joined the newly formed College Premier Division (late renamed Division 1-A) in 2010. Army reached the CPD quarterfinals in 2011 before losing to Utah, and again reached the quarterfinals in 2013. Army's rugby team was briefly suspended in 2013 after several team members violated the Army's code of conduct by forwarding inappropriate emails.

In 2014, Army reached the ACRC Bowl final, before falling to Life University.

Army also plays in rugby sevens tournaments, including the Collegiate Rugby Championship, the highest profile college rugby tournament in the U.S., reaching the finals in 2011. The Collegiate Rugby Championship is played every year in early June at PPL Park in Philadelphia, and is broadcast live on NBC. Army has established a rivalry against Navy at the CRC 7s tournament. They won the inaugural Military Memorial Cup tournament at the Collegiate Rugby Championship tournament in 2012 and won the Bowl Final in 2016 with a 10-0 victory over Maryland. Their rivalry with Navy brought them to victory in 2016 where they evened out the tournament wins against Navy 2-2.

== Club honors ==
- Division 1-A
  - Champions: 2022 (National), 2011 (East Conference)
  - Runners-up: 1990, 1991, 1992
- RugbyEast Fall
  - Champions: 2018

== Head coach/Director of Rugby ==
- Matt Sherman — 2015 - Current
- Mike Mahan — 1987–2004, 2013–2014
- Rich Pohlidal — 2005-2011

== See also ==
- College rugby
