= Dartmouth Rugby =

- Full name: Dartmouth Rugby Football Club
- Union: Ivy League
- Nickname(s): Big Green
- Founded: 1951; 74 years ago
- Location: Hanover, New Hampshire
- Ground(s): Corey Ford Clubhouse; Brophy Field; Booker Field
- Coach(es): Kyle Sumsion
- League(s): Ivy Rugby Conference
Team kit

Official website
- www.dartmouthrfc.com

The Dartmouth Rugby Football Club (or Dartmouth Rugby) is the men's college rugby team of Dartmouth College.

The student-run club was founded in 1951, and competes in the Ivy Rugby Conference against its traditional Ivy League rivals. Current head coach and former assistant coach James Willocks took over the team in 2017, leading the club to the 2019 D1-AA Spring Championship, the club's first 15-a-side national title.

== History ==
The predecessor sport to both rugby and American football at Dartmouth was an idiosyncratic ball game named "Old Division", which combined elements of soccer and rugby. The game pit teams of seniors and sophomores against juniors and freshmen, and was sufficiently popular to have slowed the development of football on the isolated campus.

Rugby was played on campus as early as 1875, when initial attempts were made to organize a team. In October 1875, Dartmouth declined an invitation to play a friendly against Tufts University as the students were "not sufficiently versed in the rules to warrant their playing."

In a nod to the then-embryonic Harvard–Yale football rivalry, Dartmouth students erected the school's first goal posts in 1876. In November 1880, the "Dartmouth Rugby Foot-Ball Association" was founded by Clarence Howland, Class of 1884.

=== Men's team ===
The Dartmouth rugby team comprises more than 100 students and often fields more than four sides on a given weekend during the fall term.

One of the strengths and strongest traditions of the two clubs are the Annual Tours, the first of which occurred during the 1958–1959 school year when Dartmouth rugby toured both England and Southern California. The former team was the first U.S. college rugby team to invade England (one English newspaper describing the event as "the nastiest upset since Bunker Hill"), and Sports Illustrated covered the 7-game tour in its January 19, 1959 issue. In 1962 DRFC toured in Ireland, and in 1964 the team toured both Germany and Scotland. Since 2000, the teams tours have included trips to England, Ireland, Italy, Spain, South Africa, Argentina, and Uruguay.

Dartmouth has enjoyed success on a national stage. In 1965, the first XV was undefeated and was declared the unofficial national collegiate champion. More recently, since 1980 Dartmouth has twice reached the finals of the US national collegiate championship and has reached the semi-finals three times. In 2011 and 2012, former head coach Alex Magleby led Dartmouth to back-to-back rugby sevens national titles in the Collegiate Rugby Championship.

=== Women's team ===
Dartmouth also has a women's team, the DWRC, which was founded in 1978, by Professor David A. Van Wie. Dartmouth women's rugby team was promoted to varsity status in 2015. The promotion to varsity was aided in part by the NCAA's commitment to contribute towards the varsity program's annual costs. Dartmouth women's rugby became the third Ivy League varsity rugby program following Harvard (2013) and Brown (2014), and if five Ivy League schools recognize their teams as varsity they can compete for an official Ivy League championship. Dartmouth women's rugby had previously unsuccessfully applied for varsity status in 2012.

DWRC has produced numerous USA Eagles National Team Players and All-Americans. Women’s rugby is led by head coach Katie Dowty.

== Cups and competitions ==
=== CRC 7s ===
Dartmouth has been successful in national rugby sevens competitions. In 2011, Dartmouth defeated Army 32-10 for the men's championship in the Collegiate Rugby Championship in a match broadcast live on NBC from PPL Park in Philadelphia. Dartmouth repeated as champions in the 2012 Collegiate Rugby Championship, defeating Cal 21-19 in the semifinal and beating Arizona 24-5 in the final. Dartmouth went 5-1 at the 2012 USA Rugby Sevens Collegiate National Championships to win the consolation bracket.

=== Ivy League Rugby ===
Dartmouth has also enjoyed success in Ivy League competitions. Dartmouth has won the Ivy League cup 12 times since it was established in 1969, including 5 consecutive championships from 1998 to 2002 and 6 consecutive championships from 2008 to 2013. In November 2011 the team captured the Ivy League Sevens Championship. Dartmouth first won the New England Championship in 1980 and has repeated numerous times. The Dartmouth Women's Rugby Club (or DWRC) has won nine Ivy League titles.

=== Varsity Cup ===
Dartmouth is one of a few select colleges to be selected to play in the Varsity Cup collegiate rugby championship. In 2013 Dartmouth was the #3 seed, behind perennially strong opponents BYU and Cal.

== Facilities ==
=== Corey Ford Clubhouse ===
The clubs dedicated the Corey Ford Rugby Clubhouse in September 2005 with matches against Army (DRFC) and Radcliffe. The Clubhouse — which is considered one of the best college rugby facilities in the country — was built into the hillside at the halfway line of Battle Field and Brophy Field, which are separated by a twenty-foot bank. Spectators view games from the deck of the Clubhouse and from the hillside that runs the length of the fields.

== Titles ==
Men's

- Ivy Rugby Championship (24): 1972, 1977, 1990, 1993, 1998, 1999, 2000, 2001, 2002, 2005, 2006, 2008, 2009 (Spring), 2009 (Fall), 2010, 2011, 2012, 2013, 2014, 2015, 2016, 2017, 2018, 2019

Women's

- NIRA Championship (3): 2018, 2021, 2022

== Notable alumni ==
- Alexander Magleby – CEO and co-founder of the New England Free Jacks and former head coach of the U.S. national rugby sevens team
- Madison Hughes - former captain of the U.S. national rugby sevens team
- Nate Brakeley - captain of Rugby New York and former player for the United States men's national rugby union team
- James Nachtwey - American photojournalist and war photographer
- Phil Klay - writer and former United States Marine Corps officer

== Notable coaches ==
- Stuart Krohn (born 1962), professional rugby union player
