= 2008 Rugby Super League =

- Countries: United States
- Champions: New York Athletic Club
- Runners-up: Belmont Shore
- Matches played: 68

The 2008 Rugby Super League season was the twelfth season of the Rugby Super League, the United States premier division of rugby. The regular season commenced on March 16, 2008. On May 3, 2008, the regular season ended, and was followed by the playoffs, for which the top four clubs qualified.

The defending champions were Belmont Shore.

== Format ==
The 18 teams were grouped into three conferences, the Red, White, and Blue Conferences. Each team played every other team in their conference once and two additional matches against two teams from the other two conferences.

== Participating clubs ==
| Club | Coach | Captain | Ground | Capacity |
|---|---|---|---|---|
| Belmont Shore | Jonnie Cox | | California State University, Long Beach | |
| Boston Irish Wolfhounds | Steve Teasdale | | Irish Cultural Center, Canton | |
| Boston | Eugene Mountjoy | | Franklin Park | 500 |
| Charlotte | David Williams | | Skillbeck Athletic Grounds | |
| Chicago Griffins | | | | |
| Chicago Lions | | | Schiller Woods | |
| Dallas Harlequins | Michael Engelbrecht | | Glencoe Park | |
| Denver Barbarians | (United States) Dave Hodges | | Dick's Sporting Goods Park, Commerce City, Colorado | |
| New York Athletic Club | Mike Tolkin | | New York Athletic Club, Travers Island, New York | |
| Old Blue | Paul Silverman | | Van Cortlandt Park, New York City | |
| Old Mission Beach Athletic Club | Reldon 'Bing' Dawson | | Little Q, San Diego | |
| Old Puget Sound Beach | Vili Lino | | | |
| Philadelphia Whitemarsh | Bob Weir | | Fairmount Park | |
| Potomac Athletic Club | Peter Baggetta | | National Mall, Washington, D.C. | |
| St. Louis Bombers | Ron Laszewski | | SportPort, Maryland Heights, Missouri | |
| San Francisco Golden Gate | Paul Keeler | | Balboa Park | |
| Santa Monica | | | | |
| Washington | (Scotland) Gary Callander | | Hyde School | |

== Standings ==
=== Red Conference ===
| | Team | Pld | W | L | D | Bonus | Total |
|---|---|---|---|---|---|---|---|
| 1 | Belmont Shore | 7 | 5 | 2 | 0 | 6 | 26 |
| 2 | Denver Barbarians | 7 | 5 | 2 | 0 | 5 | 25 |
| 3 | San Francisco Golden Gate | 7 | 5 | 2 | 0 | 5 | 25 |
| 4 | Old Mission Beach Athletic Club | 7 | 4 | 3 | 0 | 5 | 21 |
| 5 | Santa Monica | 7 | 3 | 3 | 1 | 2 | 15 |
| 6 | Old Puget Sound Beach | 7 | 1 | 6 | 0 | 2 | 6 |

=== White Conference ===
| | Team | Pld | W | L | D | Bonus | Total |
|---|---|---|---|---|---|---|---|
| 1 | New York Athletic Club | 7 | 6 | 0 | 1 | 6 | 30 |
| 2 | Boston Irish Wolfhounds | 7 | 4 | 0 | 3 | 6 | 22 |
| 3 | Chicago Lions | 7 | 4 | 0 | 3 | 5 | 21 |
| 4 | Dallas Harlequins | 7 | 4 | 1 | 2 | 3 | 21 |
| 5 | Philadelphia Whitemarsh | 7 | 1 | 0 | 6 | 2 | 6 |
| 6 | Washington | 7 | 0 | 0 | 7 | 2 | 2 |

=== Blue Conference ===
| | Team | Pld | W | L | D | Bonus | Total |
|---|---|---|---|---|---|---|---|
| 1 | Boston | 7 | 5 | 2 | 0 | 3 | 27 |
| 2 | Charlotte | 7 | 6 | 0 | 1 | 3 | 27 |
| 3 | Chicago Griffins | 7 | 3 | 0 | 4 | 5 | 17 |
| 4 | Potomac Athletic Club | 7 | 1 | 2 | 4 | 3 | 11 |
| 5 | Old Blue | 7 | 1 | 2 | 4 | 2 | 10 |
| 6 | St. Louis Bombers | 7 | 1 | 0 | 6 | 3 | 7 |

== Play-offs ==
Quarterfinals
New York Athletic Club | 19
San Francisco Golden Gate | 14
Charlotte | 24
Denver Barbarians | 39
Belmont Shore | 36
Boston Irish Wolfhounds | 8
Boston | 15
Chicago Lions | 49

Semifinals
New York Athletic Club | 22
Denver Barbarians | 8
Belmont Shore | 34
Chicago Lions | 15

Final
New York Athletic Club | 31
Belmont Shore | 28
