= 2002 Rugby Super League =

- Countries: United States
- Champions: Gentlemen of Aspen
- Runners-up: Belmont Shore
- Matches played: 68
- Top point scorer: Mike Hercus (111)
- Top try scorer: Alex Hamill (15)

The 2002 Rugby Super League season was the sixth season of the Rugby Super League, the United States premier division of rugby. The regular season commenced on March 16, 2002. On May 11, 2002, the regular season ended, and was followed by the playoffs, for which the top four clubs qualified.

The defending champions were the Gentlemen of Aspen.

== Format ==
The 17 teams were grouped into three conferences, the Red, White, and Blue Conferences. Each team played every other team in their conference once.

For the playoffs, the first seed (Belmont Shore) hosted the eighth (Dallas Harlequins), the second (Old Blue) the seventh (Kansas City Blues), the third (San Francisco) hosted the fifth (Old Mission Beach Athletic Club), and the fourth (Gentlemen of Aspen) hosted the sixth (Life University).

== Participating clubs ==
Club	Coach	Captain	Ground	Capacity
Belmont Shore			California State University, Long Beach; Hill Middle School	
Boston	Rupert Gordon		Franklin Park; Unknown venue, Framingham	500
Chicago Lions			Schiller Woods	
Dallas Harlequins	Mark McCloy		Lake Highlands Park	
Denver Barbarians	(United States) Mike DeJong		Observatory Park	
Gentlemen of Aspen			Roaring Fork High School, Carbondale	
Kansas City Blues			Minor Park	
Life University	(Wales) Mel Smith			
New York Athletic Club	Mike Tolkin		New York Athletic Club, Travers Island, New York	
Old Blue	(Australia) Geoff Mould		Van Cortlandt Park, New York City	
Old Mission Beach Athletic Club	Reldon 'Bing' Dawson		Little Q, San Diego	
Old Puget Sound Beach	Scott Shepherd			
Olympic Club	Allan Petty		California Maritime Academy, Vallejo	
Philadelphia Whitemarsh	George Betzler		Fairmount Park	
Potomac Athletic Club			National Mall, Washington, D.C. Unknown venue, Manassas, Virginia	
San Francisco	(Australia) Richard Leslie		Balboa Park	
Washington	John Redmond		Hyde School	

== Standings ==
=== Red Conference ===
	Team	Pld	W	L	D	Bonus	Total
1	Belmont Shore	6	6	0	0	4	28
2	Gentlemen of Aspen	6	5	0	1	4	24
3	Philadelphia Whitemarsh	6	2	0	4	1	9
4	Boston	6	1	0	5	0	4
5	Olympic Club	6	0	0	6	9	2

=== White Conference ===
	Team	Pld	W	L	D	Bonus	Total
1	San Francisco	6	5	0	1	4	24
2	Life University	6	4	0	2	3	19
3	Potomac Athletic Club	6	3	0	3	3	15
4	Denver Barbarians	6	3	0	3	3	15
5	Chicago Lions	6	3	0	3	2	14
6	New York Athletic Club	6	1	0	5	4	8

=== Blue Conference ===
	Team	Pld	W	L	D	Bonus	Total
1	Old Blue	6	5	1	0	3	25
2	Old Mission Beach Athletic Club	6	4	1	1	3	21
3	Kansas City Blues	6	4	0	2	4	20
4	Dallas Harlequins	6	3	0	3	4	16
5	Old Puget Sound Beach	6	1	0	5	1	5
6	Washington	6	0	0	6	0	1

== Play-offs ==
Quarterfinals
Belmont Shore	42
Dallas Harlequins	23
San Francisco	16
Old Mission Beach Athletic Club	15
Gentlemen of Aspen	63
Life University	29
Old Blue	47
Kansas City Blues	24

Semifinals
Belmont Shore	34
Old Mission Beach Athletic Club	6
Gentlemen of Aspen	17
Old Blue	8

Final
Gentlemen of Aspen	34
Belmont Shore	23
