= 2006 Rugby Super League =

- Countries: United States
- Champions: Old Mission Beach Athletic Club
- Runners-up: Belmont Shore
- Matches played: 63
- Top point scorer: Francois Viljoen (119)
- Top try scorer: Tony Fratangelo (10)

The 2006 Rugby Super League season was the tenth season of the Rugby Super League, the United States premier division of rugby. The regular season commenced on March 18, 2006. On May 7, 2006, the regular season ended, and was followed by the playoffs, for which the top four clubs qualified.

The defending champions were New York Athletic Club.

== Format ==
The 16 teams were grouped into two conferences, the Eastern, and Western Conferences. Each team played every other team in their conference once, all the teams three home games and three away games.

== Participating clubs ==
Club	Coach	Captain	Ground	Capacity
Belmont Shore			California State University, Long Beach	
Boston RFC	Eugene Mountjoy		Franklin Park	500
Charlotte	David Williams		Skillbeck Athletic Grounds	
Chicago Lions			Schiller Woods	
Dallas Harlequins	(South Africa) Michael Engelbrecht		Glencoe Park	
Denver Barbarians	Stephen Hazel		Dick's Sporting Goods Park, Commerce City, Colorado	
Kansas City Blues				
New York Athletic Club	Mike Tolkin		New York Athletic Club, Travers Island, New York	
Old Blue	Paul Silverman		Van Cortlandt Park, New York City	
Old Mission Beach Athletic Club	Reldon 'Bing' Dawson		Little Q, San Diego	
Old Puget Sound Beach	Vili Lino			
Philadelphia Whitemarsh				
Potomac Athletic Club	Peter Baggetta		National Mall, Washington, D.C.	
St. Louis Bombers				
San Francisco Golden Gate	Paul Keeler		Balboa Park	
Washington				

== Standings ==
=== Eastern Conference ===
	Team	Pld	W	L	D	Bonus	Total
1	Chicago Lions	7	6	0	1	6	32
2	Old Blue	7	4	1	2	5	25
3	New York Athletic Club	7	5	2	0	2	22
4	Potomac Athletic Club	7	4	2	1	2	20
5	Philadelphia Whitemarsh	7	4	3	0	4	20
6	Charlotte	7	2	5	0	4	12
7	Boston RFC	7	1	6	0	1	5
8	Washington	7	0	7	0	3	3

=== Western Conference ===
	Team	Pld	W	L	D	Bonus	Total
1	Belmont Shore	7	7	0	0	6	34
2	Old Mission Beach Athletic Club	7	5	2	0	7	27
3	San Francisco Golden Gate	7	5	2	0	5	25
4	Denver Barbarians	7	4	3	0	3	19
5	St. Louis Bombers	7	3	4	0	5	17
6	Old Puget Sound Beach	7	2	5	0	4	12
7	Dallas Harlequins	7	2	5	0	3	1
8	Kansas City Blues	7	0	7	0	4	4

== Play-offs ==
Quarterfinals
Belmont Shore	46
Potomac Athletic Club	15
Old Blue	25
San Francisco Golden Gate	9
Chicago Lions	34
Denver Barbarians	22
Old Mission Beach Athletic Club	30
New York Athletic Club	18

Semifinals
Belmont Shore	27
Old Blue	18
Chicago Lions	34
Old Mission Beach Athletic Club	39

Final
Belmont Shore	33
Old Mission Beach Athletic Club	36
