= 2010 Rugby Super League season =

- Countries: United States
- Champions: New York Athletic Club
- Runners-up: San Francisco Golden Gate
- Matches played: 49

The 2010 Rugby Super League season was the fourteenth season of the Rugby Super League, the United States premier division of rugby. The regular season commenced on March 13, 2010. On May 1, 2010, the regular season ended, and was followed by the playoffs, for which the top four clubs qualified.

The defending champions were New York Athletic Club.

== Format ==
The 14 teams were grouped into two conferences, the Red, and Blue Conferences. Each team played every other team in their conference once, all the teams three home games and three away games.

== Participating clubs ==
Club	Coach	Captain	Ground	Capacity
Boston Irish Wolfhounds	Steve Teasdale		Irish Cultural Center, Canton	
Boston RFC	Eugene Mountjoy		Franklin Park	500
Charlotte	David Williams		Skillbeck Athletic Grounds	
Chicago Griffins			Riis Park	
Chicago Lions			Schiller Woods	
Dallas Harlequins	(South Africa) Michael Engelbrecht		Glencoe Park	
Denver Barbarians	Stephen Hazel		Dick's Sporting Goods Park, Commerce City, Colorado	
Life University	(England) James Isaacson			
New York Athletic Club	Mike Tolkin		New York Athletic Club, Travers Island, New York	
Old Blue	Paul Silverman		Van Cortlandt Park, New York City	
Old Mission Beach Athletic Club	Reldon 'Bing' Dawson		Little Q, San Diego	
Old Puget Sound Beach	Vili Lino			
Potomac Athletic Club	Peter Baggetta		National Mall, Washington, D.C.	
San Francisco Golden Gate	Paul Keeler		Balboa Park	

== Standings ==
=== Red Conference ===
	Team	Pld	W	L	D	Bonus	Total
1	San Francisco Golden Gate	6	6	0	0	6	24
2	Denver Barbarians	6	5	1	0	5	20
3	Chicago Griffins	6	4	2	0	3	16
4	Old Puget Sound Beach	6	6	3	0	5	12
5	Chicago Lions	6	2	4	0	5	8
6	Old Mission Beach Athletic Club	6	1	5	0	2	4
7	Dallas Harlequins	6	0	6	0	3	0

=== Blue Conference ===
	Team	Pld	W	L	D	Bonus	Total
1	New York Athletic Club	6	5	0	1	3	22
2	Life University	6	5	0	1	4	22
3	Boston RFC	6	4	2	0	3	16
4	Old Blue	6	3	3	0	3	12
5	Potomac Athletic Club	6	2	4	0	2	8
6	Charlotte	6	1	5	0	2	4
7	Boston Irish Wolfhounds	6	6	0	0	2	0

== Play-offs ==
Quarterfinals
New York Athletic Club	38
Old Puget Sound Beach	29
Denver Barbarians	0
Boston RFC	28
San Francisco Golden Gate	62
Old Blue	15
Life University	56
Chicago Griffins	10

Semifinals
New York Athletic Club	34
Boston RFC	7
San Francisco Golden Gate	20
Life University	14

Final
New York Athletic Club	28
San Francisco Golden Gate	25
