= 2009 Rugby Super League season =

- Countries: United States
- Champions: San Francisco Golden Gate
- Runners-up: Life Running Eagles
- Matches played: 63

The 2009 Rugby Super League season was the thirteenth season of the Rugby Super League, the United States premier division of rugby. The regular season commenced on March 14, 2009.

== Format ==
The 16 teams were grouped into two conferences, the Red, and Blue conferences.

== Standings ==
=== Red Conference ===
	Team	Pld	W	L	D	Total
1	Life Running Eagles	7	7	0	0	33
2	New York Athletic Club	7	5	2	0	26
3	Old Blue	7	4	3	0	20
4	Dallas Harlequins	7	4	3	0	20
5	Charlotte	7	3	4	0	14
6	Boston	7	2	5	0	12
7	Potomac Athletic Club	7	2	5	0	10
8	Boston Irish Wolfhounds	7	1	6	0	6

=== Blue Conference ===
	Team	Pld	W	L	D	Total
1	San Francisco Golden Gate	7	6	1	0	30
2	Belmont Shore	7	6	0	1	29
3	Denver Barbarians	7	4	3	0	21
4	Chicago Lions	7	4	2	1	21
5	Old Mission Beach Athletic Club RFC	7	2	5	0	12
6	Chicago Griffins	7	2	5	0	11
7	Santa Monica	7	2	5	0	9
8	Old Pudget Sound Beach	7	1	6	0	5

== Play-offs ==
Quarterfinals
San Francisco Golden Gate	48
Dallas Harlequins	13
New York Athletic Club	19
Denver Barbarians	23
Life Running Eagles	22
Chicago Lions	14
Belmont Shore	36
Old Blue	15

Semifinals
San Francisco Golden Gate	19
Denver Barbarians	16
Life Running Eagles	25
Belmont Shore	3

Final
San Francisco Golden Gate	23
Life Running Eagles	13
