= 2000 Rugby Super League =

- Countries: United States
- Champions: Life University
- Runners-up: Gentlemen of Aspen
- Matches played: 58

The 2000 Rugby Super League season was the fourth season of the Rugby Super League, the United States premier division of rugby. The regular season commenced on March 11, 2000. On May 20, 2000, the regular season ended, and was followed by the playoffs, for which the top four clubs qualified.

The defending champions were the Denver Barbarians.

== Format ==
The 16 teams were grouped into two equal conferences of 8 teams, the Western, and Eastern Conferences. Each team played every other team in their conference once.

== Participating clubs ==
Club	Coach	Captain	Ground	Capacity
Belmont Shore			California State University, Long Beach	
Boston	Richard Hilton		Franklin Park	500
Chicago Lions			Schiller Woods	
Dallas Harlequins	(South Africa) Hennie Viljoen		Glencoe Park	
Denver Barbarians	Mike DeJong		Shea Stadium	18,086
Gentlemen of Aspen			Wagner Park	
Kansas City Blues				
Life University	(Wales) Mel Smith			
Old Blue	Chuck Donigian		Van Cortlandt Park, New York City	
Old Blues (California)				
Old Mission Beach Athletic Club				
Old Puget Sound Beach			Magnuson Park	3,000
Philadelphia Whitemarsh	George Betzler		Fairmount Park	
Potomac Athletic Club				
San Francisco Golden Gate	Paul Keeler		Ray Sheeran Field	4,500
Washington	Mitch Bernstein		Hyde School	

== Standings ==
=== Eastern Conference ===
	Team	Pld	W	L	D	Bonus	Total
1	Life University	7	6	1	0	6	30
2	Kansas City Blues	7	5	1	1	4	26
3	Boston	7	4	2	1	5	23
4	Chicago Lions	7	4	3	0	4	29
5	Old Blue	7	3	3	1	5	19
6	Potomac Athletic Club	7	3	4	0	3	15
7	Philadelphia Whitemarsh	7	1	5	1	4	10
8	Washington	7	0	0	7	4	4

=== Western Conference ===
	Team	Pld	W	L	D	Bonus	Total
1	Gentlemen of Aspen	7	7	0	0	7	34
2	Old Mission Beach Athletic Club	7	4	2	1	4	22
3	Dallas Harlequins	7	4	3	0	6	22
4	Old Puget Sound Beach	7	4	3	0	4	20
5	San Francisco Golden Gate	7	3	3	1	2	16
6	Denver Barbarians	7	3	4	0	4	16
7	Belmont Shore	7	1	6	0	6	10
8	Old Blues (California)	7	1	6	0	1	4

== Play-offs ==
Semifinals
W2	Old Puget Sound Beach	19
E1	Life University	28
E2	Kansas City Blues	25
W1	Gentlemen of Aspen	38

Final
E1	Life University	43
W1	Gentlemen of Aspen	21
