= 2011 Rugby Super League season =

- Countries: United States
- Champions: San Francisco
- Runners-up: Old Puget Sound Beach
- Matches played: 36

The 2011 Rugby Super League season was the fifteenth season of the Rugby Super League, the United States' premier division of rugby union. The regular season commenced March 12, 2011 with the Utah Warriors playing the Denver Barbarians. On April 30, 2011; the regular season ended, followed by the RSL playoffs, for which the top four clubs qualified. San Francisco Golden Gate won the playoffs and were crowned champions. They also had the best regular season and repeated as premiers.

The defending champions were the New York Athletic Club, the defending premiers were the San Francisco Golden Gate.

== Participating clubs ==
Club	Coach	Captain	Ground	Capacity
Boston	(Ireland) Eugene Mountjoy	—N/a	Franklin Park	500
Chicago Griffins	—N/a	—N/a	Schiller Park	1,000
Chicago Lions	(Canada) Marty Wiggins	—N/a	Lions Field	3,500
Dallas Harlequins	(United States) Michael Engelbrecht	—N/a	Glencoe Park	2,000
Denver Barbarians	(England) Dave Hodges	(United States) Kevin Whitcher	Dick's Sporting Goods Park	18,086
Life	—N/a	—N/a	LU Sports Complex	10,000
New York Athletic	(New Zealand) Mike Tolkin	(United States) Alexander Magleby	Travers Island	5,000
Old Blue	(France) Gui Cieutat	(United States) Justin Ripley	Pier 40	1,200
OPSB	(United States) Evan Haigh	—N/a	Magnuson Park	3,000
San Francisco	(United States) Paul Keeler	—N/a	Rocca Field	4,500
Utah Warriors	(United States) Jon Law	(Fiji) Ross Sua	Rio Tinto Stadium	20,008

== Standings ==
=== Red Conference ===
	Team	Pld	W	L	T	PF	PA	PD	BT	BL	Total
1	San Francisco	6	6	0	0	335	94	241	6	0	30
2	Old Puget Sound Beach	6	4	2	0	195	158	37	3	1	20
3	Utah Warriors	6	3	3	0	199	157	42	4	1	17
4	Barbarians	6	2	4	0	259	196	63	5	1	14
5	Dallas	6	0	6	0	79	460	−381	0	0	0

=== Blue Conference ===
	Team	Pld	W	L	T	PF	PA	PD	BT	BL	Total
1	Life	6	6	0	0	192	98	94	4	0	28
2	Boston	6	4	2	0	169	147	22	4	0	20
3	New York	6	3	3	0	156	128	28	4	1	17
4	Lions	6	3	3	0	115	147	−32	1	1	14
5	Griffins	6	2	4	0	130	135	−5	2	2	12
6	Old Blue	6	0	6	0	99	206	−107	0	2	2

- 4 points awarded to the winning team
- 0 points to the losing team
- 2 points to each team in the case of a tie
- 1 bonus Point to a team scoring 4 or more tries
- 1 bonus Point to a losing team keeping the score within 7 points

== Play-offs ==
Semifinals
B1	Life	27
B2	Boston	23
R1	San Francisco	53
R2	Old Puget Sound Beach	22

Final
B1	Life	15
R1	San Francisco	20
