= 2012 Rugby Super League season =

- Countries: United States
- Champions: NYAC
- Runners-up: Old Puget Sound Beach
- Matches played: 35

The 2012 Rugby Super League season was the sixteenth and final season of the Rugby Super League, the United States premier division of rugby union, before being replaced by the USA Rugby Elite Cup. The regular season commenced on March 10, 2012. On May 19, 2012, the regular season ended, and was followed by the playoffs, for which the top four clubs qualified.

The defending champions and premiers were the San Francisco Golden Gate. New York Athletic Club RFC won both the regular season and the playoffs.

== Participating clubs ==
Club	Coach	Captain	Ground	Capacity
Boston	(Ireland) Eugene Mountjoy	—N/a	Franklin Park	500
Chicago Griffins	(New Zealand) Wesley Parkes	—N/a	Schiller Woods	1,000
Dallas Harlequins	(South Africa) Michael Engelbrecht	—N/a	Glencoe Park	2,000
Denver Barbarians	(United States) Jason Kelly	(United States) Kevin Whitcher	Shea Stadium	18,086
Life	(England) James Isaacson	—N/a	LU Sports Complex	10,000
New York Athletic	(New Zealand) Mike Tolkin	(United States) Alexander Magleby	Travers Island	5,000
Old Blue	(New Zealand) Marty Veale	(United Kingdom) Dominic Wareing	Baker Field	1,200
OPSB	(Australia) Evan Haigh	—N/a	Magnuson Park	3,000
San Francisco	(United States) Paul Keeler	—N/a	Ray Sheeran Field	4,500

== Standings ==
=== Red Conference ===
	Team	Pld	W	L	D	Bonus	Total
1	Old Puget Sound Beach	9	9	0	0	7	43
2	San Francisco	9	5	4	0	9	29
3	Griffins	8	4	4	0	3	19
4	Barbarians	8	3	5	0	7	19

=== Blue Conference ===
	Team	Pld	W	L	D	Bonus	Total
1	New York	9	9	0	0	8	44
2	Life	9	6	3	0	5	29
3	Old Blue	8	3	4	1	4	18
4	Dallas	8	0	6	2	5	9
5	Boston	8	1	6	1	2	8

- 4 Points awarded to the winning team
- 0 Points to the losing team
- 2 Points to each team in the case of a tie
- 1 Bonus Point to a team scoring 4 or more tries
- 1 Bonus Point to a losing team keeping the score within 7 points

== Play-offs ==
Semifinals
R1	Old Puget Sound Beach	39
R2	San Francisco	6
B1	NYAC	38
B2	Life	12

Final
R1	Old Puget Sound Beach	29
B1	NYAC	32
