= USA Rugby Elite Cup =

American rugby union competition

- Sport: Rugby union football
- Inaugural season: 2013 (first and only)
- Replaced by: USA Rugby Super League
- Number of teams: 8
- Country: United States (USA Rugby)
- Champions: (California) SFGG
- Website: Elite Cup

The USA Rugby Elite Cup was an American rugby union competition which ran for just one season in 2013. The competition was founded in 2012, replacing the USA Rugby Super League involving top USA rugby clubs. The inaugural Elite Cup tournament began on 16 March 2013, but the competition folded at the end of 2013.

== Format ==
=== Pool stage ===
Two pools of four teams play three games, one against each other team in their pool. There is no inter-pool play. The pools are divided geographically, East & West. Four points are awarded for a win and two points for a draw. A bonus point is awarded for a loss by seven points or fewer, or for scoring four tries or more. The top two teams from each pool qualify for the semi-finals. The two pool winners have home field advantage.

=== Knock-out stage ===
The semi-finals are East 1 vs East 2 and West 1 vs West 2. The semi-finals are played at the home stadiums of the higher-seeded teams.

== Teams ==
Team	Pool	Stadium (capacity)	City
Boston	East	Franklin Park (500)	Boston, MA
Denver Barbarians	West	Shea Stadium (Denver)	Denver, CO
Glendale Raptors	West	Infinity Park (4,000)	Glendale, CO
Life	East	Life University Rugby Complex	Marietta, GA
New York Athletic Club (or NYAC)	East	Travers Island	New York City
Old Blue	East	Columbia Soccer Stadium (3,500)	New York City
Seattle Saracens	West	Magnuson Park	Seattle, WA
San Francisco Golden Gate (or SFGG)	West	Ray Sheeran Field	San Francisco, CA

Locations of teams for the 2013 Elite Cup season.

== Results ==
Year	Location	Final			Ref.
Year	Location	Winner	Score	Runner-up	Ref.
2013	Infinity Park; Glendale, Colorado	San Francisco Golden Gate	31–26	Life	
