= Mike Palefau =

US international rugby union player

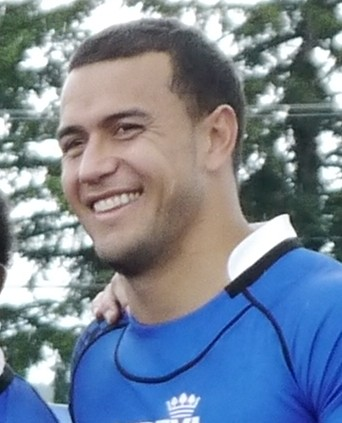
- Born: Mike Palefau; September 10, 1981 (age 45) Kahuku, Hawaii
- Height: 6 ft 1 in (1.85 m)
- Weight: 205 lb (93 kg)

Rugby union career
- Position(s): Center, Wing
Amateur team(s)
Years	Team	Apps	(Points)
2011	Utah Warriors		
2012	OPSB		
Senior career
Years	Team	Apps	(Points)
2006–2007	RC Narbonne	0	(0)
2007–2008	Petrarca	9	(5)
2018	Seattle Seawolves	0	(0)
2018	Utah Warriors	1	(0)
International career
Years	Team	Apps	(Points)
2005–2008	United States	11	(15)
- Correct as of 23 January 2019
National sevens team
Years	Team		Comps
2005–2014	United States		22
- Correct as of 16 February 2014

Mike Palefau is an American rugby union player who plays center in 7s and wing in 15s. Palefau currently plays for the Utah Warriors having moved mid season from the Seattle Seawolves.

Palefau has been playing rugby since he was 18 years old. Palefau attended Southern Utah University and played rugby for the Collegiate All-American Team. Palefau excelled in other sports at Kahuku High School and at Southern Utah University, playing defensive back in football, and as a sprinter on the track team. Palefau finished second in the 2000 Hawaii High School Championships in the 100 meter and 4x100 meter sprints.

== International career ==
Palefau played for the US national 7s team. He was the team's leading try scorer and points scorer for the 2011-12 IRB Sevens World Series. Palefau debuted for the national 7s team in 2005, playing in the 2005 Rugby World Cup Sevens. Since 2005, Palefau was a steady scorer for the US. At the time of his retirement from the 7s national team, he ranked as one of the top active try-scorers for the US 7s team with over 20 tries on the IRB Sevens World Series.

Palefau was "discovered" in the summer of 2004 while playing with the Provo Steeler rugby team in a sevens competition in Park City, Utah, when US National team scouts noticed Palefau's athleticism and quickness. Palefau debuted for the Eagles 15s national team in 2005 against Canada. Since then, he has totaled 11 caps playing wing for the 15s national team.

Palefau took a break from international rugby between 2009–11, focusing on family life and on finishing his Master's degree at the Southern Utah University.

== Club rugby ==
Palefau has played professional club rugby oversees with Narbonne in France (2006–07) and with Petrarca in Italy (2007–08), before returning to the US to finish his degree at Southern Utah University.

Palefau helped lead Las Vegas to a national D1 club championship in 2010. Palefau currently plays for OPSB club in the Rugby Super League (US).

Palefau signed with the Seattle Seawolves in 2017, for the upcoming 2018 Major League Rugby season.

== See also ==
- United States national rugby sevens team
