= Utah Warriors (disambiguation) =

Utah Warriors is a rugby union team playing in Major League Rugby.

Other uses:

- Utah Warriors (indoor football), a National Indoor Football League team that played from 2003–2004.
- Utah Warriors (Rugby Super League), a rugby union club that played in 2011.
