= Walt Elder =

American rugby union player

Walter Elder (born 2 October 1991) is an American rugby union player who plays as a prop. He plays for Kansas City Blues and the United States national rugby sevens team. He debuted for the Eagles against Chile at the 2017 USA Sevens tournament on 3 March 2017.
