= Commisso Soccer Stadium =

Soccer stadium in Manhattan, New York

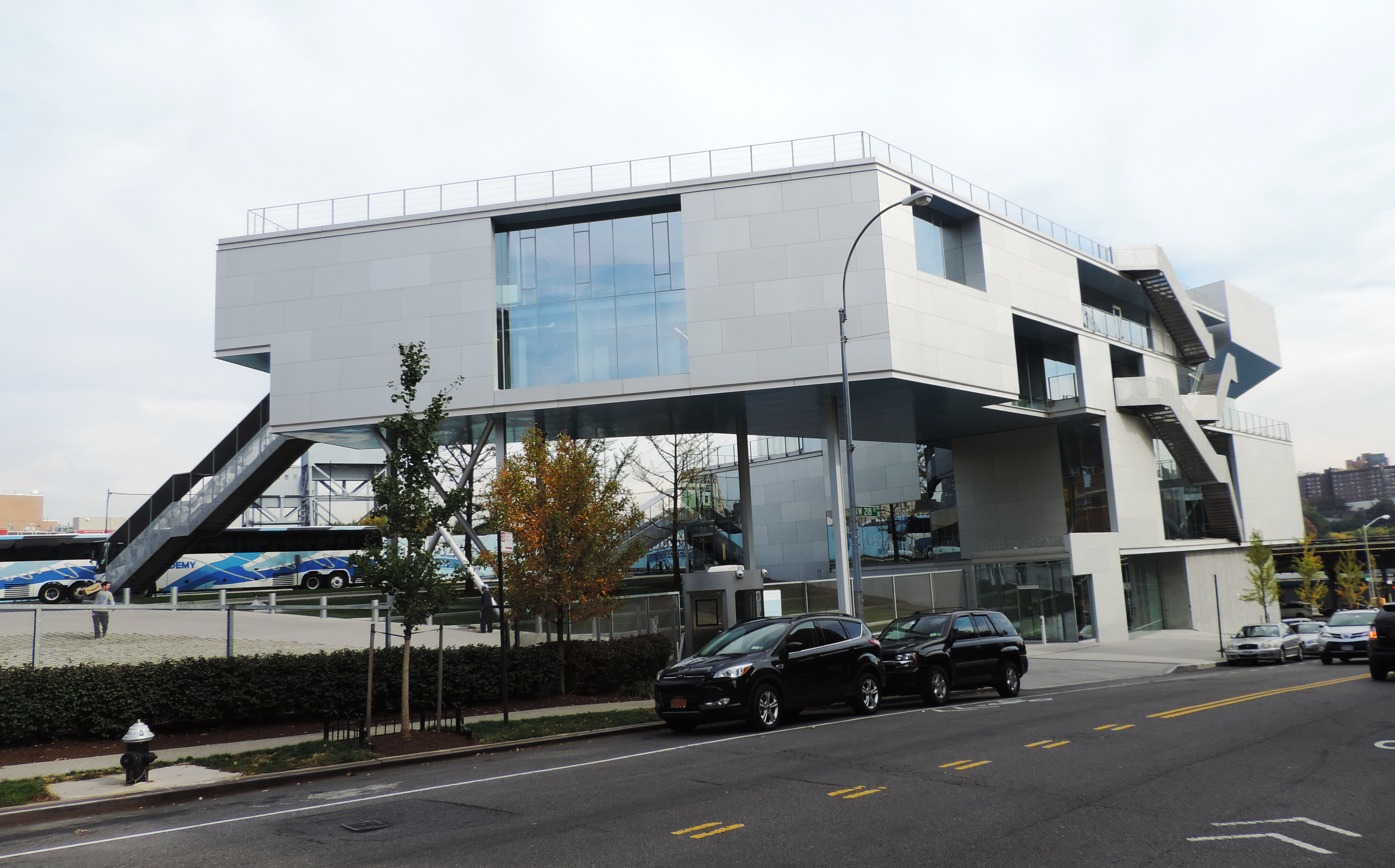
- Exterior view of the stadium in 2014
- Interactive map of Commisso Soccer Stadium
- Full name: Rocco B. Commisso Soccer Stadium
- Former names: Columbia Soccer Stadium
- Address: 533 W 218th St. New York, NY; United States
- Coordinates: 40°52′20.3982″N 73°54′49.9284″W
- Owner: Columbia University
- Operator: Columbia Univ. Athletics
- Capacity: 3,500
- Type: Stadium
- Surface: FieldTurf
- Field size: 120 yd × 75 yd (110 m × 69 m)
- Current use: Soccer; Lacrosse; Rugby
- Public transit: New York City Subway: at 215th Street at Inwood–207th Street

Construction
- Opened: August 1984; 42 years ago
- Cost: $1 million

Tenants
- Columbia Lions (NCAA) teams: men's and women's soccer, women's lacrosse (Note: Not permanent venue. It alternates with the Robert Kraft Field.); Old Blue RFC (1984–present); New York Red Bulls II (USLC) (2015); New York Cosmos B (NPSL) (2017–2019); Brooklyn FC (USLS) (Fall 2024)

Website
- gocolumbialions.com/commissostadium

The Rocco B. Commisso Soccer Stadium (formerlly, Columbia Soccer Stadium) is a 3,500 seat soccer-specific stadium located in Inwood, on the northernmost tip of the island of Manhattan, New York City, within the Baker Athletic Complex. Opened in August 1984, the stadium is home venue to Columbia University's men's and women's soccer, and women's lacrosse teams. Apart from the university teams, the stadium has served as home venue for some professional soccer teams such as New York Red Bulls II, New York Cosmos B, or Brooklyn FC, and rugby team Old Blue RFC of USA Rugby Club 7s and hosted matches of the American Rugby Premiership.

The stadium is named in honor of Rocco B. Commisso, former co-captain of Columbia's 1970 varsity soccer team. Comisso was the owner and Chairman of the New York Cosmos and ACF Fiorentina, as well as the head of cable television provider Mediacom.

== History ==
In September 1997, the stadium hosted a semi-final match of the 1997 U.S. Open Cup between the MetroStars and the Dallas Burn of Major League Soccer. From May to July 2015, the stadium was the part-time home of the New York Red Bulls II of the United Soccer League Championship where they played only one home match.

In 2016, a new FieldTurf surface was installed at the stadium. In 2017, the university opened the "Bubble at Baker", a heated seasonal air-supported structure. The Bubble encloses the soccer field and provides 92,000 sq ft (8,500 m^{2}) of winter practice space for Columbia's sports teams. The Bubble will be inflated each winter from December through March. The stadium is adjacent to Robert K. Kraft Field at Lawrence A. Wien Stadium and the Campbell Sports Center.

=== Transformation to COVID field hospital ===
In response to the COVID-19 pandemic in New York City, NewYork-Presbyterian / Columbia University Irving Medical Center turned Robert K. Kraft Field and Columbia Soccer Stadium into a 288-bed field hospital during 2020. The field hospital is named for decorated US Navy SEAL Ryan F. Larkin (1987–2017), who served in Iraq and Afghanistan. The care center was staffed primarily with former US military personnel in conjunction with NewYork-Presbyterian's frontline staff.
