= Alexander Magleby =

US international rugby union player & US rugby union executive (born 1978)

Alex Magleby
- Born: Alexander Magleby; February 19, 1978 (age 48) Salt Lake City, Utah, United States
- School: Highland (Salt Lake City, Utah)
- University: Dartmouth College
- Occupation(s): Executive Chairman, The New England Free Jacks

Rugby union career
- Position: Flanker
Senior career
Years	Team	Apps	(Points)
2000	Gentlemen of Aspen		
2001	Silverdale United RFC		
2002–04	New York Athletic Club		
International career
Years	Team	Apps	(Points)
2000–01	United States	4	(0)
National sevens team
Years	Team		Comps
2000–05	United States (captain)		
Coaching career
- Years: Team
- 2013–2023: Dartmouth Rugby (Technical Advisor)
- 2012–2013: USA 7s (head coach)
- 2011: US Collegiate All-Americans 7s (head coach)
- 2009–2011: US Collegiate All-Americans 15s (head coach)
- 2001–2012: Dartmouth Rugby (head coach)

Alexander Magleby (born February 19, 1978) is the co-founder and Executive Chairman of the professional rugby union team, The New England Free Jacks. He is a former professional rugby union coach, and former United States national team player and captain.

== Early life and education ==
Magleby played for high school rugby coach Larry Gelwix at Highland High School from 1993 to 1996. The movie Forever Strong (2008) was inspired by coach Gelwix and his team's history, particularly during the mid-1990s era. Magleby helped the team win national championships in 1994, 1995, and 1996, and was the team's Most Valuable Player (Forward) his senior season. Magleby was the first Highland Rugby alumnus to play both 15s and 7s for US Eagles national team.

While at Highland High School Magleby served as Student-Body President, was co-captain of the American football team, and was Valedictorian.

A Dartmouth College alumnus, Magleby was captain his senior year (1999–2000). He started at flanker all four years helping lead the Big Green to Ivy League Championships in 1998, 1999, and 2000 under long-term Dartmouth Rugby head coach, Wayne Young.

== Playing career ==
Magleby was selected to the US national rugby sevens team his senior year of Dartmouth College, subsequently starting at hooker from 2000 to 2005, and captaining the Eagles to the 2005 Rugby World Cup Sevens. He also appeared for the US Eagles 15s on eight occasions garnering four test match caps from 2000 to 2001.

While playing for the United States, Magleby served on the USA Rugby Board of Directors Executive Committee as the international athlete representative.

== Coaching career ==
A Dartmouth College alumnus, and former Dartmouth Rugby captain, he coached his alma-mater and the Ivy League powerhouse from 2001 to 2012, leading the program to eight Ivy League Championships in that time and a five-year Ivy Rugby undefeated record. Under his tutelage the Dartmouth's Sevens team won the USA Sevens national Collegiate Rugby Championship in 2011 and 2012.

Magleby was the head coach of the US national rugby sevens team for the last portion of the 2012 IRB Sevens World Series, the 2013 IRB Sevens World Series, and the 2013 IRB Rugby World Cup Sevens in Moscow. He took over for former coach Al Caravelli in March 2012 as the first ever full-time daily training environment and residency program was established for men and women USA Rugby sevens players in Chula Vista, CA. Magleby announced his retirement in June 2013 to return to his consulting business. He soon thereafter became the Technical Advisor to Dartmouth Rugby.

In his short 16-month tenure, Magleby led the US team from a 14th place one-win nine-loss streak, to by his last three tournaments, a top-five iRB Sevens World Series point collection. The 2012–13 season was marked as the most number of Cup finishes by a USA team up to that point, with Cup qualification in five of the nine tournaments, including two Plate championship wins, the team's first ever in the 16-team tournament format.

The 2012–13 USA team crucially finished one place ahead of rival Canada in 11th place, and proved by the end of Magleby's tenure to be able to best the world's traditional 7s powers with first-ever wins over South Africa and multiple playoff wins over Fiji. As of the end of 2013 the US national rugby sevens team had never beaten the All Black Sevens team, although Magleby's teams dropped the average point differential from 34.0 during the previous coach's tenure to 9.5 during 2012–13 IRB Sevens World Series. "Alex Magleby who has just completed his first full season has seen his side finish the season so strongly that commentators are thinking they might be an outside bet for Rugby World Cup Sevens Moscow."

Prior to coaching the US national rugby sevens team, Magleby was the head coach of the Men's Collegiate All-Americans – the elite university-level developmental program in the US from 2009 to 2011. He led the All-Americans to a 2–1 record over the New Zealand Universities in a three-match series in 2011.Magleby also coached the first-ever Men's Collegiate All-Americans Sevens team in 2011, a program designed to help prepare athletes for the senior men's team and the Olympics.

Players that were introduced to international rugby sevens under Magleby's coaching tenure include Brett Thompson, Mike Teo, Jack Halalilo, Nate Augspurger, Luke Hume, and Carlin Isles. Notably Isles was a 100-meter sprinter who Magleby transitioned into rugby over the summer of 2012, by placing Isles at the Gentlemen of Aspen RFC under the tutelage of national team manager Andy Katoa. Three weeks after Isles first picked up a rugby ball, Magleby took him on development tour to Canada with famed touring side Atlantis. Following the tour Magleby signed Isles to a one-year contract at the United States Olympic Training Center.

As coach of the All-Americans, Magleby worked with and played a role in selecting and developing several current Eagles and international pros including Hayden Smith, Kevin Swiryn, Blaine Scully, Cam Dolan, Eric Fry, Zack Test, Colin Hawley, Peter Tiberio, Rocco Mauer, Seamus Kelly, Ahmad Harajly, and Shaun Davies.

While working with Dartmouth, Magleby has mentored Team USA Olympic rugby captain Madison Hughes, as well as Major League Rugby players Nate Brakeley, Steve Dazzo, Oliver Engelhart, Stephen Hinshaw, and Mason Koch.

== Management career ==
In February 2014 Magleby returned to USA Rugby as the National Development Director for Sevens. In 2015 Magleby was named the USA Rugby Performance Director. This role evolved in 2016 to become General Manager for National Teams and High Performance. Magleby led the US rugby delegation and teams at the 2016 Olympic Games in Rio.

Initiatives established during Magleby's tenure include the Elite City 7s, the first US rugby team to compete in the Youth Olympic Games, both the Men's and Women's Olympic Development Academy system, the first Men's and Women's Falcons Sevens development programs, The USA Rugby HiPer database, the first Girls High School All-American program, the first Women's Collegiate All-American Sevens team, USA Rugby National Tracking and Olympic Recruitment Camps, The Eagle Files, Project SOAR, the USA Rugby Performance Game Board, the first full-time General Manager of Women's High Performance, the first full-time Women's Eagles Head Coach, the CARE program in support of holistic athlete welfare, and co-founding the Golden Eagles—the philanthropic arm of the USA Men's and Women's Sevens.

National teams performances were collective historic bests with a first ever Men's Eagles test win over a tier-1 playing nation, Men's Eagles qualifying for Rugby World Cup as the Rugby Americas #1 seed for first time in history, and a historic best 13th World Rugby ranking; Women's Eagles 4th at Rugby World Cup, and the beginning half of historic best 2nd overall World Series finishes for the Men's and Women's Sevens teams.

In 2018 Magleby would become a Cofounder of the New England Free Jacks of the MLR. He would also serve as CEO of the team from 2018–2024 then being promoted executive chairman in 2025. During his tenure the Free jacks have won three straight MLR championships in 2023, 2024, 2025.

In December 2025 Magleby was named the Co-President, Strategy & Communications of Major League Rugby.

== Entrepreneurship ==
Magleby co-founded Sylvan Advantage LLC in 2004.

In 2014 Magleby founded US Collegiate Development to better foster relationships between student-athletes and collegiate coaches.

== Personal life ==
Magleby is married and has three children.

== Honors ==
- 3x Major League Rugby champion (as an executive): 2023, 2024, 2025
- Collegiate Rugby Championship Hall of Fame: 2025
- 13x Ivy Rugby Champion: (as a player) 1998, 1999, 2000 (as a coach) 2001, 2002, 2005, 2006, 2008, 2009 (Spring), 2009 (Fall), 2010, 2011, 2012
- Dartmouth College Wearers of Green Athletic Hall of Fame: 2000
- 3x High School National Champion: 1994, 1995, 1996

== See also ==
- United States national rugby sevens team
- IRB Sevens World Series
- Collegiate Rugby Championship
- Dartmouth Big Green
- New England Free Jacks
