= Rugby Super League (United States) =

Rugby union organization

- Sport: Rugby union
- Founded: 1996
- First season: 1997
- Folded: 2012
- No. of teams: 8
- Country: United States
- Last champion: (New York (state)) New York Athletic Club (2012)
- Most titles: (California) Belmont Shore (New York (state)) NYAC (4 titles)
- Website: Premier-Rugby.com

The USA Rugby Super League, usually known as the Super League or RSL, was a national rugby union competition which ran from 1997 to 2012, contested by nine clubs in the United States by its last year. In the 2013 season, it was replaced by the USA Rugby Elite Cup.

USA Rugby, the sport's national governing body sanctioned the Super League competition. It was the premier level of rugby union in the country until its reformation into the Elite Cup.

RSL was developed in 1996 due to the increased demand for greater visibility and a higher competitive structure for rugby union in the United States. The management structures of the 14 best rugby organizations in the United States, created RSL and regular competition started in 1997. In 2007 and 2008 the total number of competing RSL clubs peaked at 18. In the 2011 season, the 11 teams competing were divided into two conferences, Red and Blue. The league's 2012 season and final season saw 9 teams, again divided into Red and Blue conferences. Following the 2012 season most of the remaining Super League teams entered the USA Rugby Elite Cup competition.

== Teams ==
Season	# Teams	First season	Last season
1997	14	Belmont Shore; Chicago Lions; Dallas Harlequins; Denver Barbarians; Gentlemen of Aspen; Golden Gate; Kansas City Blues; Life; Old Blue; Old Blues (CA); OMBAC; OPSB; Potomac Athletic Club; Washington RFC	—N/a
1998	16	Boston RFC; Philadelphia Whitemarsh RFC	—N/a
1999	16	—N/a	—N/a
2000	16	—N/a	—N/a
2001	16	—N/a	Old Blues (CA)
2002	17	NYAC; Olympic Club RFC	Life
2003	16	—N/a	—N/a
2004	16	—N/a	—N/a
2005	16	—N/a	Gentlemen of Aspen
2006	16	St. Louis Bombers	Kansas City Blues
2007	18	Boston Irish Wolfhounds; Charlotte Rugby Club; Chicago Griffins; Santa Monica	—N/a
2008	18	—N/a	Philadelphia Whitemarsh RFC; St. Louis Bombers; Washington RFC
2009	16	Life (re-joined)	Belmont Shore; Santa Monica
2010	14	—N/a	Boston Irish Wolfhounds; Charlotte Rugby Club; OMBAC; Potomac Athletic Club
2011	11	Utah Warriors	Chicago Lions; Utah Warriors
2012	9	—N/a	Chicago Griffins*; Dallas Harlequins*
*Clubs did play in the 2013 USA Rugby Elite Cup.

== History ==
=== Seasons 1997 to 2000 ===
Rugby Super League formed at a time when there was a need for expansion of the highest level of competitive rugby in the country. The 1997 season was the inaugural season with 14 teams competing into two seven-team divisions, the Western-Pacific Conference and the Midwestern-East Conference.

The original competing sides in the 1997 season were as follows: Belmont Shore RFC, the Chicago Lions, the Dallas Harlequins, the Denver Barbarians, the Gentlemen of Aspen, the Kansas City Blues, Life, Old Blue, Old Blues Rugby Club (CA), Old Puget Sound Beach RFC, Old Mission Beach Athletic Club RFC, the Potomac Athletic Club RFC, Golden Gate Rugby Club and Washington RFC. Aspen won the first championship, defeating Old Blue 22 points to eight in the final which was played in San Diego.

The league expanded in 1998, with two more sides gaining entry into the competition, Boston RFC and Philadelphia Whitemarsh RFC. Both teams joined the eastern conference and Harlequins move to the Western conference. This expansion saw two fifteen-team conferences.

=== Seasons 2001 to 2007 ===
In 2001 USA rugby recognized the competition as the premier club rugby union competition in the United States, distinguishing it from USA Rugby Division 1. In 2002, the league expanded again, with the inclusion of New York Athletic Club via promotion from Division and Olympic Club RFC, who gained entry through a merger with the Old Blues Rugby Club (CA).

The 2002 season saw major changes to the competition, with the dissolution of the "East and West divisions" in favor of a national competition. Belmont Shore made it back-to-back Super League championships beating San Francisco Golden Gate in the 2004 final. The tournament format reverted to the Eastern and Western conferences in 2005 to preserve traditional rivalries and reduce travel costs. Super League celebrated a decade of competition in 2006, with OMBAC defeating Belmont Shore 36–33 in the final in Santa Clara, California. Following the 2006 season Rugby Super League expanded from 15 teams to 18 for the 2007 season. Santa Monica Rugby and Charlotte Rugby Club accepted invitations to join Super League, as did the 2006 Divisions I and III runner-ups Boston Irish Wolfhounds. In 2008 the Chicago Griffins joined RSL, replacing the Kansas City Blues, who self-relegated to the USA Rugby Division I men's club competition.

=== 2008 to 2012: Contraction and demise ===
In the 2008 season ESPN Classic showed a live broadcast of the RSL final between NYAC and Belmont Shore. It was a hard-fought match with NYAC winning 31–28 in sudden death.

The league contracted and featured 16 teams in two conferences in the 2009 season. The Philadelphia Whitemarsh, Washington RFC, and the St. Louis Bombers did not return to the competition, while Life University returned after a six-season absence. In part due to the Great Recession, longtime RSL powers Belmont Shore decided to only compete in Southern California's Division I competition for the 2010 season. In response to this, Santa Monica also decided to self-relegate, dropping the number of RSL teams to 14. To rebalance the conferences, Dallas was shifted to the Red (West) Conference. In August 2010 the Boston Irish Wolfhounds, and Charlotte RFC also relegated themselves.

In the fall of 2011, PAC Rugby withdrew from the competition and the Utah Warriors, based in Salt Lake City, entered the competition. The Chicago Lions and Utah Warriors withdrew prior to the 2012 season. The Chicago Griffins announced their withdrawal following the 2012 season. With the exit of several teams over a number of years, the 2012 season was the last season for the Rugby Super League.

=== 2013: Relaunch as Elite Cup ===
With eight teams remaining in two divisions, the RSL was relaunched as the USA Rugby Elite Cup for the 2013 season. The Elite Cup ran for just one season before folding at the end of 2013.

== Teams (2012) ==
Team	City	Stadium	Joined	Head coach
Red Conference
Denver Barbarians	Littleton, CO	Shea Stadium	1997	(United States) Jason Kelly
Old Puget Sound Beach	Seattle, WA	Magnuson Park	1997	(Australia) Evan Haigh
San Francisco Golden Gate	San Francisco, CA	Rocca Field	1997	(United States) Paul Keeler
Blue Conference
Boston RFC	Boston, MA	Franklin Park	1998	(South Africa) Eugene Mountjoy
Dallas Harlequins	Dallas, TX	Glencoe Park	1997	(South Africa) Michael Engelbrecht
Life University Running Eagles	Marietta, GA	International Sports Complex	1997; 2009 (re-joined)	(England) James Isaacson
New York Athletic Club	Travers Island, NY	Travers Island	2002	(United States) Mike Tolkin
Old Blue	New York City, NY	Pier 40	1997	(New Zealand) Marty Veale

== Championship results ==
Year	Location	Final				Ref.
Year	Location	Winner	Score	Runner-up	Final Attendance	Ref.
1997	San Diego, California	Aspen	22–8	Old Blue	1,000	
1998	Boston, Massachusetts	Belmont Shore	28–10	Old Blue	—N/a	
1999	Denver, Colorado	Denver Barbarians	22–18	Belmont Shore	—N/a	
2000	San Diego, California	Life	43–21	Aspen	—N/a	
2001	Rockford, Illinois	Aspen	56–21	OMBAC	—N/a	
2002	Aspen, Colorado	Aspen	34–23	Belmont Shore	4,000	
2003	San Francisco, California	Belmont Shore	23–15	OMBAC	—N/a	
2004	Newport, Rhode Island	Belmont Shore	24–21	San Francisco Golden Gate	—N/a	
2005	Rentschler Field; East Hartford, Connecticut	NYAC	23–19	Belmont Shore	—N/a	
2006	Buck Shaw Stadium; Santa Clara, California	OMBAC	36–33	Belmont Shore	750	
2007	The Little Q Rugby Field; San Diego, California	Belmont Shore	27–21	Chicago Lions	—N/a	
2008	Infinity Park; Glendale, Colorado	NYAC	31–28 (OT)	Belmont Shore	—N/a	
2009	Infinity Park; Glendale, Colorado	San Francisco Golden Gate	23–13	Life	—N/a	
2010	Rocca Field; San Francisco, California	NYAC	28–25	San Francisco Golden Gate	2,200	
2011	International Sport Complex; Marietta, Georgia	San Francisco Golden Gate	20–15	Life	—N/a	
2012	Magnuson Park; Seattle, Washington	NYAC	32–29	Old Puget Sound Beach	—N/a	

== Results by club ==
Team	Winners	Runners-up	Years won	Years losing finalist
Belmont Shore	4	5	1998, 2003, 2004, 2007	1999, 2002, 2005, 2006, 2008
NYAC	4	0	2005, 2008, 2010, 2012	
Aspen	3	1	1997, 2001, 2002	2000
San Francisco Golden Gate	2	2	2009, 2011	2004, 2010
Life	1	2	2000	2009, 2011
OMBAC	1	2	2006	2001, 2003
Denver Barbarians	1	0	1999	
Old Blue	0	2		1997, 1998
Chicago Lions	0	1		2007
Old Puget Sound Beach	0	1		2012

== Player statistics ==
=== Top scorers ===
Most tries
Year	Player	Team	Tries	Ref.
2002	(United States) Alex Hammill	Belmont Shore	15	
2003	(United States) H. Taylor	Gentlemen of Aspen	8	
2006	(United States) Tony Fratangelo	Belmont Shore	10	
2009	(United States) Peter Sio	Belmont Shore	8	

Most points
Year	Player	Team	Pts	Ref.
2002	(United States) Mike Hercus	Belmont Shore	111	
2003	(United States) Dave Burt	Potomac	80	
2006	(United States) Francois Viljoen	Belmont Shore	119	
2009	(United States) Volney Rouse	SFGG	107	

== Notable players ==
- Matt Alexander — USA Eagle
- Andre Bachelet — USA Eagle
- Justin Boyd — USA Eagle
- Brian Doyle — USA Eagle
- Philip Eloff — USA Eagle
- Paul Emerick — USA Eagle
- Troy Hall — USA Eagle
- Mike Hercus — USA Eagle's all-time leading points scorer
- Toby L'Estrange — USA Eagle
- Rob Lumkong — USA Eagle
- Alexander Magleby — USA Eagle
- Brian McClenahan — USA Eagle
- Tyson Meek — USA Eagle
- Folau Niua — USA Eagle and 7's player
- Alec Parker — USA Eagle
- Dan Payne — USA Eagle
- Mike Petri — USA Eagle
- Shawn Pittman — USA Eagle
- Anthony Purpura — USA Eagle
- Dan Power — USA Eagle
- Samu Manoa — USA Eagle
- Louis Stanfill — USA Eagle
- Volney Rouse — USA Eagle
- Doug Rowe — USA Eagle
- Tai Tuisamoa — USA Eagle
- Francois Viljoen — USA Eagle
- Craig Wells — Australia U-21 international
- Link Wilfley — USA Eagle
- Matt Wyatt — USA Eagle

== See also ==
- Americas Rugby Championship
- Rugby union in the United States
- United States national rugby union team
- USA Rugby
  - North America 4, predecessor to the ARC
- PRO Rugby
- Major League Rugby
