= Belmont Shore RFC =

US rugby union club, based in Long Beach, CA

Belmont Shore
- Full name: Belmont Shore Rugby Club
- Union: USA Rugby
- Founded: 1974; 52 years ago
- Location: Long Beach, California, US
- Ground: Long Beach State rugby field
- President: Stuart Ledsam
- Coach: Ray Egan
- League: Pacific Rugby Premiership
Team kit

Official website
- www.belmontshorerfc.com

Belmont Shore Rugby Club is an American rugby union team named after the Belmont Shore neighborhood of Long Beach, California, which has a tradition of amateur rugby.

== History ==
The Belmont Shore team was founded in 1974, and was one of the original US Rugby Super League teams in 1997. The team has been in the Super League Finals in seven of the past ten championships. They have been league champions four times, most recently in 2007. They were runners-up to the New York Athletic Club team in 2005, and to the San Diego–based Old Mission Beach Athletic Club team in 2006.

Belmont Shore dropped out of the Rugby Super League in October, 2009. In 2014 it joined the Pacific Rugby Premiership.

== Club honours ==
- Rugby Super League Champions: 1998, 2003, 2004, 2007
- Rugby Super League Runner-up: 1999, 2002, 2005, 2006, 2008
- US Men's Division I National Championship Runner-up: (15s) 2010
- US Men's 7s National Champions: 2009
- US Men's 7s National Runner-Up: 2008, 2010
- US Men's 7s National Champions: 2011
- US Men's 7s National Champions: 2012
- US Men's Division I National Champions (15's): 2012

== Teams ==
Belmont Shore features adult and youth divisions. The adult division competes in the Pacific Rugby Premiership & Division I; the youth division features many teams - U-8 through U19.

== Sponsorship ==
The SuperLeague's primary sponsor is Michelob Amber Bock, with each individual team receiving a portion of those revenues. In addition to Amber Bock, Belmont Shore has individual sponsorships. Notable primary sponsors include CP Ships and Dr Pepper/7Up. Also DCL Direct (Direct Container Line) and Kudu Rugby.

== Notable players ==
Note: caps and participation are accurate as of 10 August 2006

=== United States national team ===
- Mike Hercus, fly-half, thirty-six international caps, 387 international points.
- Chris Ostentowski, prop, eight international caps
- Francois Viljoen, fullback, thirteen international caps (63 points in international tests)

=== Other notable players ===
- Craig Wells, centre, Australia U21 - 1990,91, NSW Waratahs - 1991,92 (10 x caps), Australian Wallaby World Cup Training Squad & Australia "B" - 1991, ACT Brumbies Super 12s - 1998,99 (2 x caps), Australian Classic Wallabies - 1999, USA Super League National Champion - 2004,07 (Belmont Shore), USA Classic Eagles - 2008
- Lee Peina, halfback, Northland
- Joe Taufete'e
- Mike Te'o

== Notable coaches ==
- Ray Egan — Head coach of Belmont Shore until his February 2016 appointment with the San Diego PRO Rugby team.

== Other rugby teams in Long Beach ==
Besides Belmont Shore RFC, there is the Belmont Shore Women's Rugby Football Club (nicknamed the "Landsharks", they have two national championships), Coast Women's RFC, and a men's club team at Long Beach State (which has made the National Final Four on four occasions),
