= Gentlemen of Aspen RFC =

US rugby union club, based in Aspen, CO

- Full name: Gentlemen of Aspen Rugby Football Club
- Union: USA Rugby; Eastern Rockies Rugby Football Union
- Nickname: Gents
- Founded: 1968; 58 years ago
- Ground(s): Wagner Park, Downtown Aspen (Capacity: 5000)
- Coach: Ben Mitchell competitions = USA Rugby
| 1st kit | 2nd kit |

Official website
- aspenrugby.com

The Gentlemen of Aspen Rugby Football Club is an eight-time National Club Champion rugby union team based in Aspen, Colorado. Gentlemen of Aspen RFC was a founding member of the Rugby Super League, a national competition that ran from 1997 to 2012. They withdrew from the Super League during the 2005 season due to its unsustainable financial viability.

They now compete in the Rocky Mountain Premiership (D2), Colorado Rocky Mountain League and host the Aspen Ruggerfest tournament in the third week of September every year.

== Mountain League ==
The Gents are the current Mountain League Champions and hold the Ski town trophy along with the Cowpie Champions trophy for 2017.

== Notable players ==
60 Aspen players have played for the USA Eagles National Rugby team. Including 11 at one time.

- Carlin Isles, Wing, United States 7s, Glasgow Warriors
- Alec Parker, lock
- Ben Mitchell, lock

== Honors ==
| Type | Competition | Titles | Winning years |
|---|---|---|---|
| National | National Club Championship D1 | 5 | 1997, 1998, 1999, 2000, 2009, 2010 |
| National | Rugby Super League | 3 | 1997, 2001, 2002 |
| National | USA Rugby Club 7s | 1 | 2008 |
| Regional | Rocky Mountain Premiership (D2) | 1 | 2025 |
| Regional | West Club D1 | 7 | 1996, 1997, 1998, 1999, 2000, 2009, 2010 |
| Regional | Mountain League | 1 | 2017 |
| Invitational | Aspen Ruggerfest | 25 | 1971, 1985, 1987, 1989, 1990, 1992, 1994, 1996, 1997, 1998, 1999, 2000, 2001, 2002, 2004, 2006, 2007, 2008, 2009, 2015, 2018, 2021, 2022, 2023, 2024 |
| Invitational | Rocky Mountain/Denver 7s | 5 | 1987, 1988, 1992, 1993, 2008 |
