= Boston Irish Wolfhounds =

US rugby union club, based in Boston, MA

(United States) Boston Irish Wolfhounds
- Full name: Boston Irish Wolfhounds Rugby Football Club
- Union: USA Rugby
- Nickname: Wolfhounds
- Founded: 1989; 37 years ago
- Ground: Irish Cultural Center (Capacity: 2,000)
- President: Robert Haller
- Coach(es): Ed Guitton, Conor Kindregan
- Captain: Joe Griffin
- League(s): New England Rugby Football Union Division 2 & Division 3
Team kit

Official website
- www.wolfhoundsrugby.org

The Boston Irish Wolfhounds Rugby Football Club (also known as BIWRFC) is a rugby union team based in Canton, Massachusetts, US. The club competes in, and is governed by, the New England Rugby Football Union (their LAU), the Northeast Rugby Union (their TAU), and USA Rugby. In 2014 it joined the American Rugby Premiership.

The club was established in the late 1980s as a social touring side, but was not recognised as an official club until 1992, when they entered the NERFU Division II in 1992. They advanced to the NRU Premier Division in 1995, winning it for the first time in 1998 and entered the Super League in 2007. BIWRFC competed in the NERFU Division 1 until 2017. "The Hounds" currently compete in New England Rugby Football Union Division 2 & Division 3. BIWRFC is recognised as one of the leading rugby union clubs in the United States.

== History ==
=== Founding ===
The Wolfhounds began as a social touring side of rugby players in the Boston area looking to travel the United States during their off-seasons with their respective clubs. Due to their successes while touring (particularly in New Orleans and Texas) and enormous support from the Boston Irish community, the Wolfhounds became an official team and entered into the New England Rugby Football Union (NERFU) Division II in 1992. An unintended consequence of the establishment was the eventual disestablishment of Beacon Hill RFC (lost most of its first XV pack), the end of Mystic River Rugby Club's appearances as a national level club (lost three key first XV), and the relegation of Charles River RFC (lost complete first XV backline) to Division II.

During their inaugural season, the first XV suffered only one regular season loss and reached the Northeast Championships.

In 1995, the Wolfhounds met enough success to warrant the leap to the Northeast Rugby Football Union (NRU) Premier Division.

=== 2000–present ===
In 2000, they won the Northeast Championships for the first time. In 2001, they advanced to the USA Rugby Division I National Championship pool for the first time, reaching the Sweet 16 pool. In 2002, they matched their 2001 successes and reached the Sweet 16 for a second straight season.

In 2003, the Wolfhounds entered and won a number of local and national tournaments and they were able to win the NERFU Division I Championship as well as the National Championship. Wolfhounds scrumhalf Dave Williams was named tournament MVP. In 2004, the Wolfhounds repeated as both NERFU Division I champions and USA Rugby Division I national champions. Adam Thomas of the Wolfhouds was named tournament MVP. In 2005, the Wolfhounds became NERFU Division I champions for the third straight year and finished in fifth place in the Division I National Championship tournament.

In 2006, the Wolfhounds became the first-ever US team to submit two sides to the national championship tournament. Both the first XV and the third XV came in second place (Division I and Division III, respectively). In 2007, the Wolfhounds became USA Division III National Champions in San Diego.

Since 2017 the Hounds have competed in New England Rugby Football Union Division 2. In the aftermath of the COVID pandemic the Wolfhounds reintroduced their storied Division 3. In 2022 the Division 2 team won the New England Rugby Football Union championship. The Division 3 team lost in the championship semifinal to eventual winners, Providence Rugby Football Club.

The Wolfhounds also field a third XV of "old boys" and new players with little experience. They compete in the New England Rugby Football Union Division III. They have been met with success, winning the NERFU Division III championships in 1996, 1997, 2002, 2004, 2005, 2006, and 2009.

== Honors ==
=== Club Championships ===
- USA Rugby
  - 2003 USA Rugby Men's Club D1 Champions – 2003
  - 2004 USA Rugby Men's Club D1 Champions – 2004
  - 2nd place – 2006
  - 5th place – 2005
- Division 1 Northeast Rugby Union Champions – 2000, 2002
- Division 1 New England Rugby Football Union Champions – 2003, 2004, 2005
- Division 2 New England Rugby Football Union Champions – 2022, 2023, 2024, 2026
- Division 3 New England Rugby Football Union Champions – 2024

=== Tournament Championships ===
- Ft. Lauderdale Ruggerfest Champions – 2003, 2005
- Jersey Shore Tournament Champions – 2004
- Mad River Invitational Champions – 2004, 2007, 2008
- New England 10s Champions – 2003, 2005
- Newport 7s Champions – 2005
- Newport 15s Champions (Division I) – 2006, (Division 2) 2016, (Division 3) 2021
- New York 7s Champions – 2004
- Thompson Island Tournament Champions – 2003
- Vermont Invitational Tournament
  - 2nd place – 2005
- Worcester 7s Champions – 2003

== Third XV Honors ==
=== Club Championships ===
- USA Rugby National Division III Competition
  - 2nd place – 2006
- Division III New England Rugby Football Union Champions – 1996, 1997, 2002, 2004, 2005, 2006, 2009

=== Tournament Championships ===
- Lansdowne RFC New York City St. Patrick's Day Tournament Champions – 1998, 1999
- MIT Culliton Tournament Champions – 1996, 1997, 1998, 1999
- Newport 15s Champions (Division III) – 2006
- Saranac Lake Can-Am Tournament – 1996

== Individual Honors ==
- 2003 USA Rugby National Division I Championship Tournament MVP – Dave Williams
- 2004 USA Rugby National Division I Championship Tournament MVP – Adam Thomas

== Sponsorship ==
The Wolfhounds have several individual sponsorships. Notable primary sponsors include The Somers Group including Paddy O's. The club also has several secondary sponsorships from local and regional businesses.

== Recruiting ==
The Wolfhounds have been able to provide hospitality, housing, and career opportunities for players coming to Boston to play for the Hounds. This is one of the reasons they have been able to maintain success on the field. The team is composed of Americans, but there is also a large contingent of foreigners. Many countries are represented Australia, France, England, New Zealand, Fiji, and Wales.

BIWRFC has established relationships with local high school and college sides, which become feeder teams for the Wolfhounds. This allows the Wolfhounds to maintain a large player pool of young athletes. Members of the Wolfhounds have coached Northeastern University RFC, a nationally ranked Division I college side, Boston College, Harvard University, MIT and University of Notre Dame. Wolfhounds players also coach the Boston collegiate select-side All-Star team, which won the NERFU collegiate all-star tournament last spring. The Wolfhounds also coach Boston College High School RFC, which is perennially one of the best high school teams in the country, as well as Belmont High School Rugby which is four time MIAA state champions. Wolfhound alumni also coach at The College of the Holy Cross.

In recent years, the Wolfhounds have sent some of these young collegiate athletes abroad to gain experience by playing professionally. As of April 2006, there are two Wolfhounds playing in the NPC league in New Zealand.

As of April 2006, members of the Wolfhounds include a current USA Rugby U19 National Team player, two former U19 National Team players, and the current captain of the USA Rugby Collegiate All-Star team.

The Wolfhounds were a key player in organizing the Boston Rugby Consortium which consists of all NERFU clubs in the city of Boston. The club lent their administrative expertise to secure practice pitches from the city's Parks and Recreation department on a regular basis for the clubs. They have also initiated several coaching clinics and courses to build rugby in the Boston area among all clubs.

== Notable Wolfhounds ==
- Dave Williams, former Wolfhounds scrumhalf, USA Rugby National Team
- Brian Lemay, Wolfhounds prop, USA Rugby National Team
- Mark Tutton - Wolfhounds scrumhalf, South Canterbury provincial team (2002–2012), New Zealand Heartland XV 2007
- Thomas Lee, former Wolfhounds wing, 1992 USA Rugby National U19 Team (US High School Development XV)
