= Utah Warriors (Rugby Super League) =

Defunct US rugby union club, based in Salt Lake City, Utah

(United States) Utah Warriors RUFC
- Full name: Utah Warriors Rugby Union Football Club
- Union: USA Rugby
- Founded: 2010; 16 years ago
- Disbanded: 2012; 14 years ago
- CEO: Sean Whalen
- Coach: Jon Law
- League: Rugby Super League

The Utah Warriors was an American rugby union team based in Salt Lake City, Utah. The team played in the Rugby Super League in the 2011 season, but then folded in 2012.

== History ==
The Utah Rugby Union made a formal request to join the Rugby Super League in 2010 and was accepted into the national competition for the 2011 season. The Utah Warriors team was formed mainly from rugby players within the state of Utah, but also attracted marquee signings such as US national players Mike Palefau and Jason Pye. The Warriors had an active roster of more than 35 players. Utah entrepreneur Sean Whalen oversaw the team's operations and Jon Law was the head coach.

I'm excited at the level of talent that we’ve attracted to this team. With the strength in local talent, and the vision and motivation of this staff, we have created a top-notch team that can rival any team in the league. We are expecting great things from the Utah Warriors.

— Jon Law, Head coach, December 13, 2010.

The Warriors finished mid-table in their conference with a 3–3 record in 2011 and did not make the play-offs. The team was dropped from the league for the 2012 season after failing to register their players by the required deadline.

== Successor ==
In 2017, Rugby Utah Ventures resurrected the name "Utah Warriors" for their team to compete in Major League Rugby.

– See: Utah Warriors
