= Kansas City Blues (rugby union) =

US rugby union club, based in Kansas City, Missouri

(United States) Kansas City Blues
- Full name: Kansas City Blues Rugby Football Club
- Union: USA Rugby
- Nickname: Blues
- Founded: 1966; 60 years ago
- Ground: Sporting KC Training Facility
- President: Chris George
- Coach: James Patterson
- League(s): USA Rugby Divisions 1 and 2
Team kit

Official website
- www.kcblues.org

The Kansas City Blues compete in the USA Rugby Division 1, the highest amateur level. They also field a Division 2 team that offers new and inexperienced players the opportunity to learn the game and advance to Division 1.

The Blues currently practice and play their home matches at the Children’s Mercy Training Facility at Swope Soccer Village. The Division 1 team competes in the Midwest Rugby Premiership against teams from Chicago, Minneapolis, Milwaukee, Cincinnati, Columbus, and Iowa.

== History ==
Based on a loose affiliation with both University of Missouri-Kansas City and Rockhurst College, the Kansas City Blues Rugby Club was established in 1966. The founding members focused on developing a unique club identity and culture. Throughout the 1970s and 1980s, the Blues elevated their rugby knowledge and skills, becoming successful in the United States by winning prominent annual tournaments, like Aspen Ruggerfest, Heart of America, and St. Louis Ruggerfest. The club built a reputation for playing hard-nosed rugby, always leaving the game on the field, and maintaining close social connections with teammates off the field.

In 1993, the Blues won their league, advanced to Nationals, and lost in the Final Four. In 1997, the Blues became founding members of the United States Rugby Super League (USA / 1997-2012), composed of the top 14 teams in the nation. In the inaugural year, the Blues made it to the Super League Final Four. Over the next ten years, the Blues competed in RSL with several winning seasons.

In 2007, the Blues decided to restructure and move back to Division 1. The club successfully rebuilt and, in 2012, became the second club to send two separate teams to the National 15s playoffs round of eight, competing in the Division 1 and the Division 3 National Playoffs. Ultimately, the Division 1 team lost a close match (23-20) to Belmont Shore (California), who won the National Championship that season. In 2014-2015, the Blues went to the Division 1 National Championship but lost in the round of eight to Mystic River (Boston).

The Blues field a Division 1 team that competes in the Midwest Rugby Premiership, along with other teams from Chicago, Minneapolis, Milwaukee, Columbus, and Cincinnati. The Division 2 team competes in the Heart of America League with other regional teams, like St. Louis and Omaha. Since the Blues joined the Midwest Premiership, they amassed an impressive Division 1 league record of 40-18 from 2013 to 2017.

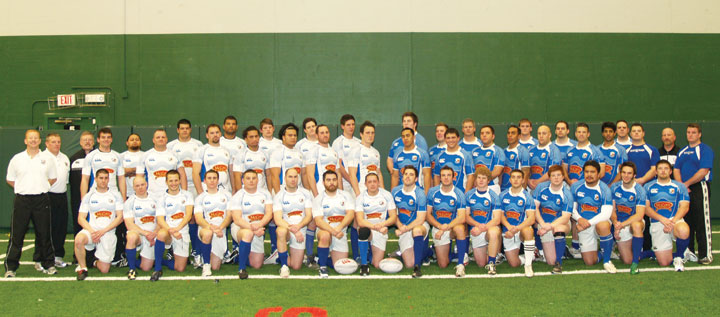
2009 Kansas City Blues team

In addition to 15s, the Blues have a successful history in 7s rugby. The Blues have qualified for and appeared in the 7s National Championship Tournament 14 times from 1990 to 2017. In those 14 appearances, the Blues made the Final Four five times and were National runner up three times, but never won the National Championship.

In 1993, the Blues made their first ever 7s Final Four, finishing National runner-up in a close loss to New York Old Blue. Seven years later, the Blues returned to the 2000 National Championship Match and lost. In 2014, the Blues lost in the National Semi-Finals but won a spirited match against regional foe and rivals, the Denver Barbarians, to take 3rd place. Most recently, in 2016, the Blues advanced to the 7s National Championship Match but lost to Utah. The Blues currently host one of the largest and most successful 7s programs in the country. In 2014, the Blues debuted their Sporting 7s Academy program, which takes college-aged players and places them in a special training program designed to increase their fitness and advance their rugby skills. The Blues can field three Blues and Academy in various local and regional tournaments.

In 2026, former Springbok Naas Botha was appointed director of rugby.

=== Affiliation ===
On May 19, 2011, the Blues announced their affiliation with Sporting Kansas City, a Major League Soccer team that had been planning to expand into other sports. The team would be a founding member of the Sporting Club Network and share facilities with the soccer team, including occasional matches at their home stadium Livestrong Sporting Park.

=== Match schedule and travel ===
The fall season consists of local and regional match play, highlighted by the annual trek to the Aspen Ruggerfest and the start to the split-season West Division 1 North and Division 3 Heart of America League match play. The Club completes the League seasons in the early spring as playoffs loom. Throughout the fall and spring, the Reserve team plays League matches against regional Division 3 clubs.

=== Representative and international players ===
The Blues have also sent a number of players to the United States national rugby union team, The Eagles, in both 7s and 15s rugby:

- Hal Edwards (Reserve, 1976–84)
- Vic Clark (Cougars, 1978)
- Kirk Miles (2 Eagles caps, 1982)
- Fred Paoli (20 Eagles caps, 1982–91)
- Frank Kennedy (USA 'A' 15s, 1988)
- Maika Sika (capped over 45 times for both the 7s and 15s Eagles sides)
- Tim Kluempers (3 Eagles caps 2001)
- Doug Brown (Eagles 7s)
- Michael Skahan (Eagles 7s)
- Steve Robke (Eagles 7s)
- Ed Mills (15s ARC, 2015)
- Brodie Orth (3 Eagles Caps, 2016)
- Walt Elder (Eagles 7s, 2017)

In addition to these National Team Players, the Blues have had dozens invited to USA Eagle Tryout camps, made age-graded USA Eagles, and join the first professional rugby league in the United States: Major League Rugby (MLR).
