= Balboa Park, San Francisco =

Public park in San Francisco, California

Balboa Park
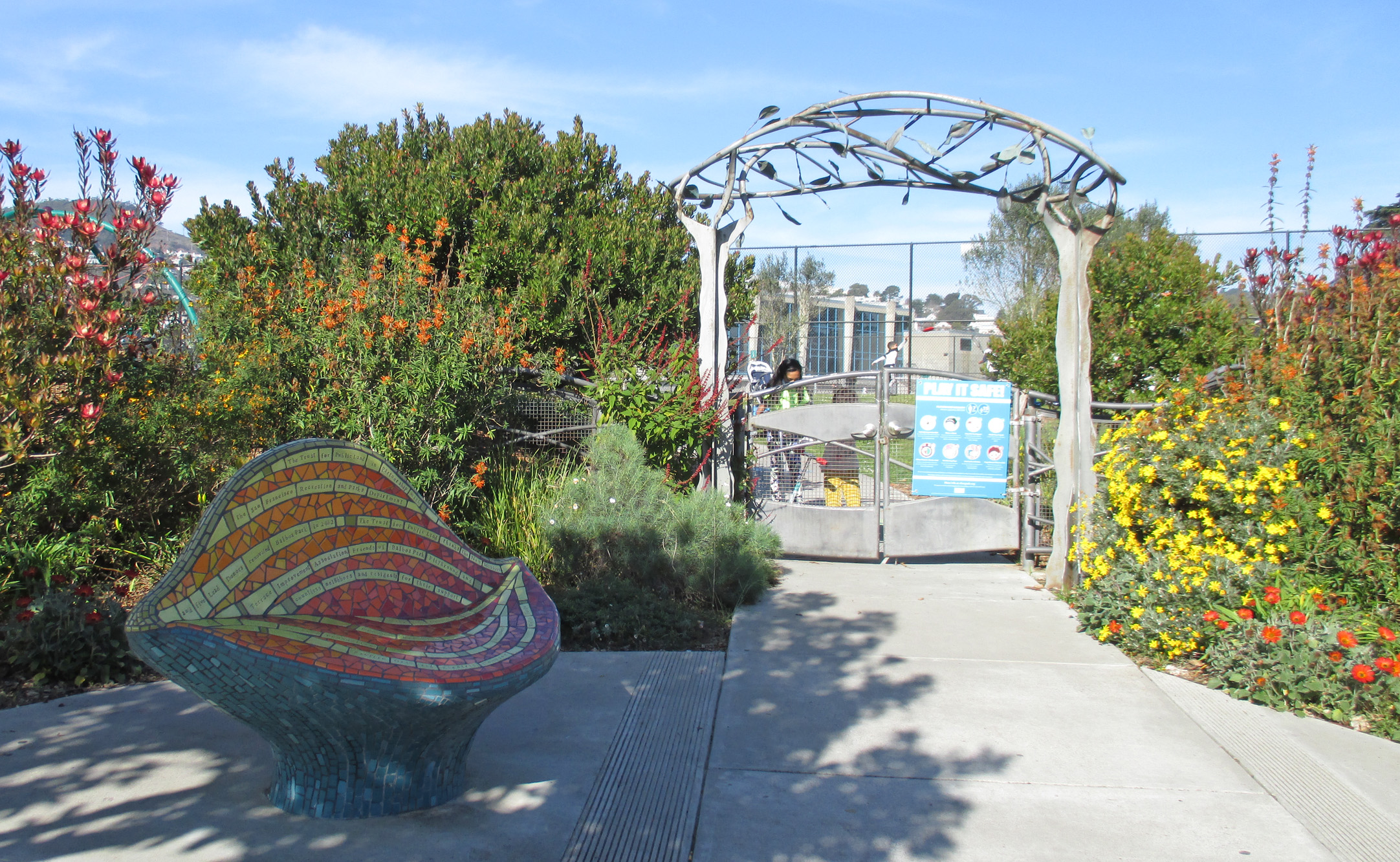
- Balboa Park Playground entrance, Jan 2021
- Interactive map of Balboa Park
- Type: Public park
- Location: San Francisco, California
- Coordinates: 37°43′30″N 122°26′42″W
- Established: 1909; 117 years ago
- Operator: San Francisco Recreation & Parks Department

Balboa Park is a public park in the Mission Terrace neighborhood of San Francisco, California. It was originally dedicated in 1909 when the park included the land now used by City College of San Francisco Ocean Campus west of I-280 Freeway. The park is located in the Outer Mission neighborhood group, and is adjacent to the neighborhoods of Cayuga, Ingleside, Oceanview, and Sunnyside. The park covers about 25 acres and includes among its facilities: Balboa Park Swimming Pool, Balboa Park Playground, Matthew J. Boxer Stadium (soccer), Sweeney Field (baseball), Balboa Skate Park, an off-leash dog area, a picnic area, tennis courts, and a basketball court.

Balboa Park is bounded on the north by Havelock Street, on the east by San Jose Avenue, on the west side by the I-280 Freeway, and on the south by Ocean Avenue. Located at the center of the park on the west side is the Ingleside Police Station, built about the same time the park was dedicated.

== History ==
Balboa Park was originally dedicated in 1909 and named after the explorer and conquistador Vasco Núñez de Balboa. The City stated plans to develop the park to serve the residents of the Outer Mission district. At that time the dedicated park included the entire 100-acre House of Refuge lot, which included the current City College of San Francisco Ocean Campus, on the west side of the Southern Pacific Railroad tracks (now I-280 Freeway).

The presence of the Ingleside Jail complex on the original park land slowed development and improvement of Balboa Park from 1910 until the jail was removed in 1934. In 1936 the portion of the park on the west of the railroad tracks was given to City College, and the remaining portion, about 26 acres east of the freeway line, became Balboa Park as it is known today.

== Gallery ==
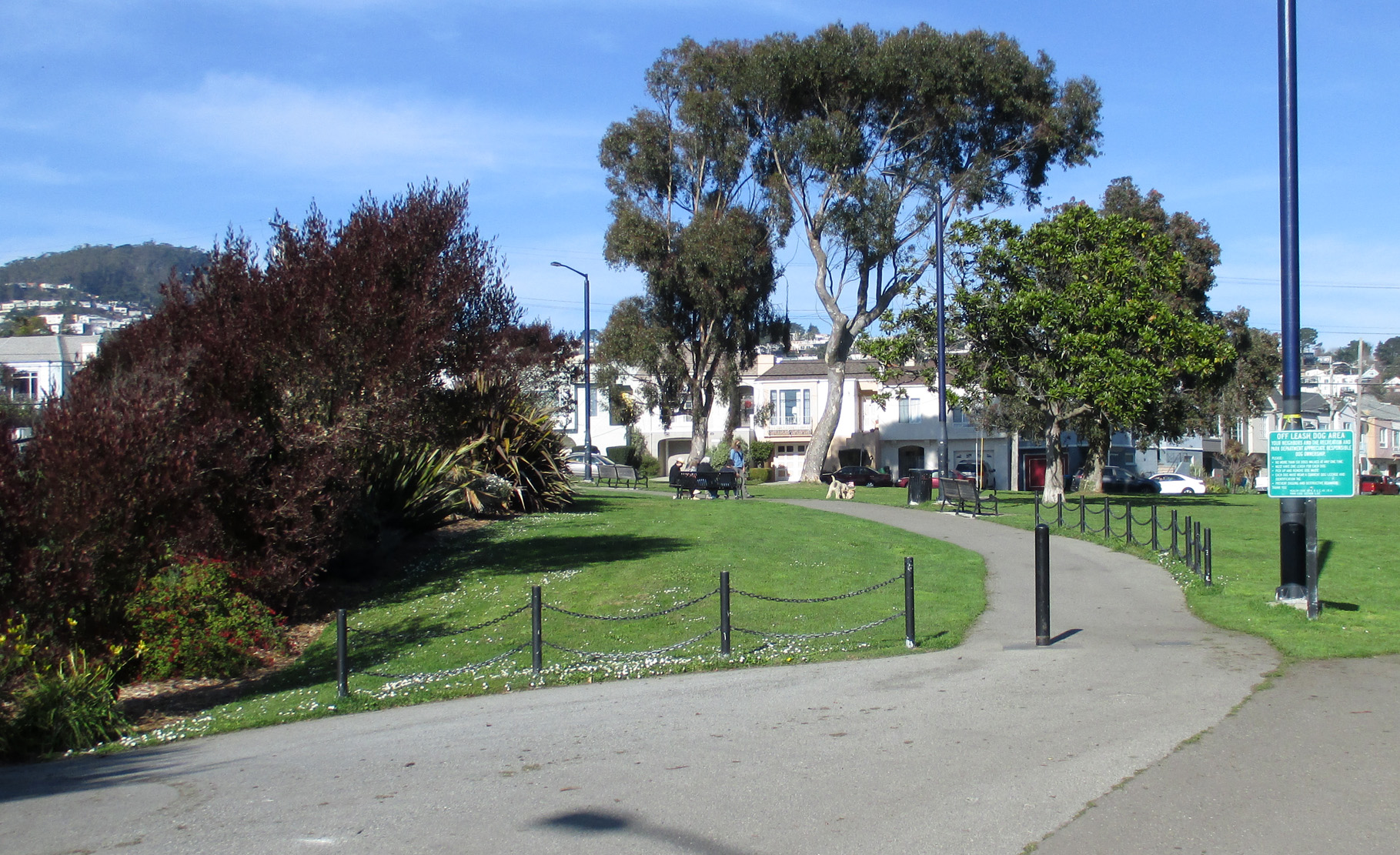
Off-leash dog area, January 2021

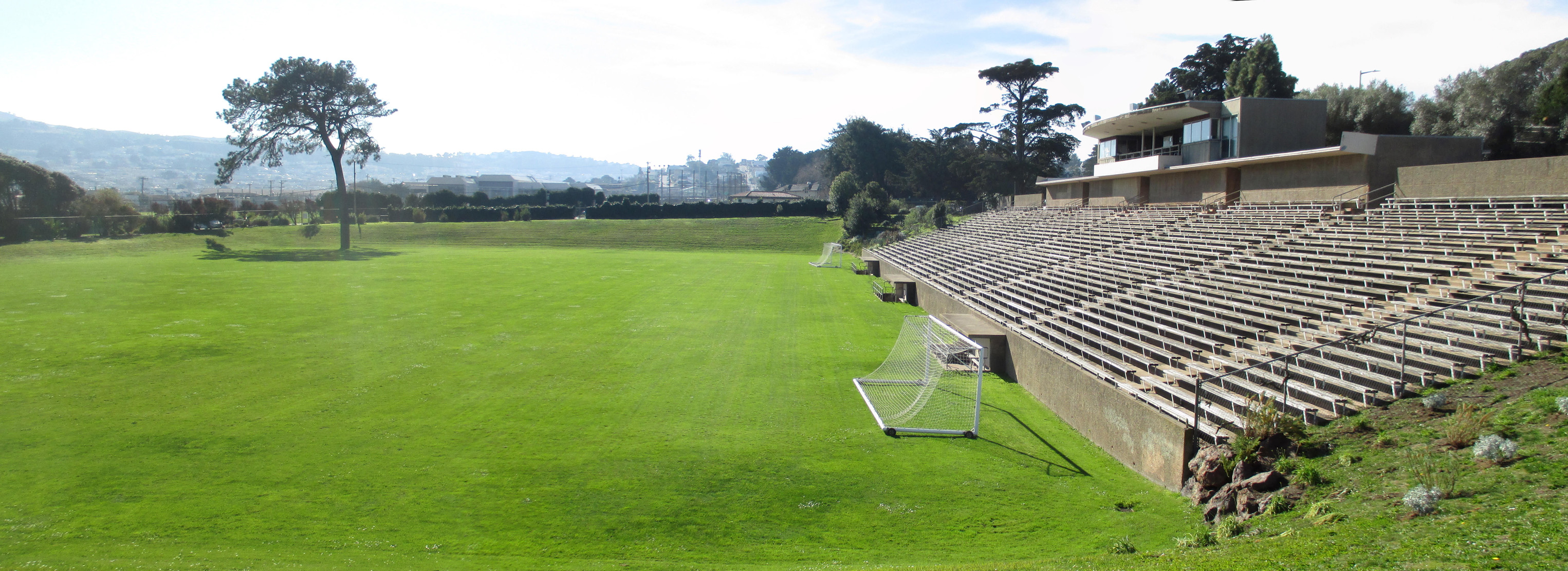
Boxer Stadium, January 2021

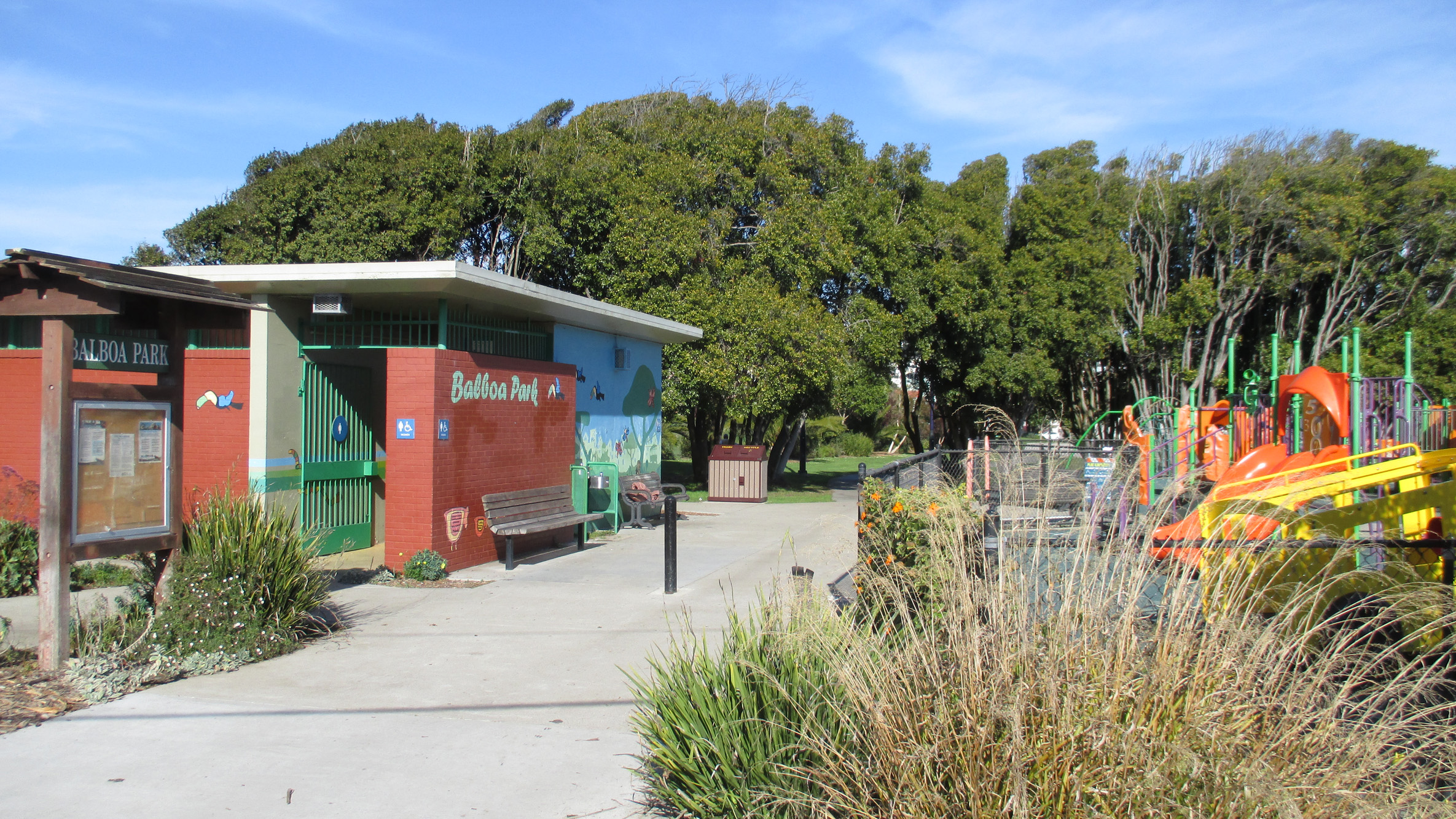
Balboa Park Playground, January 2021

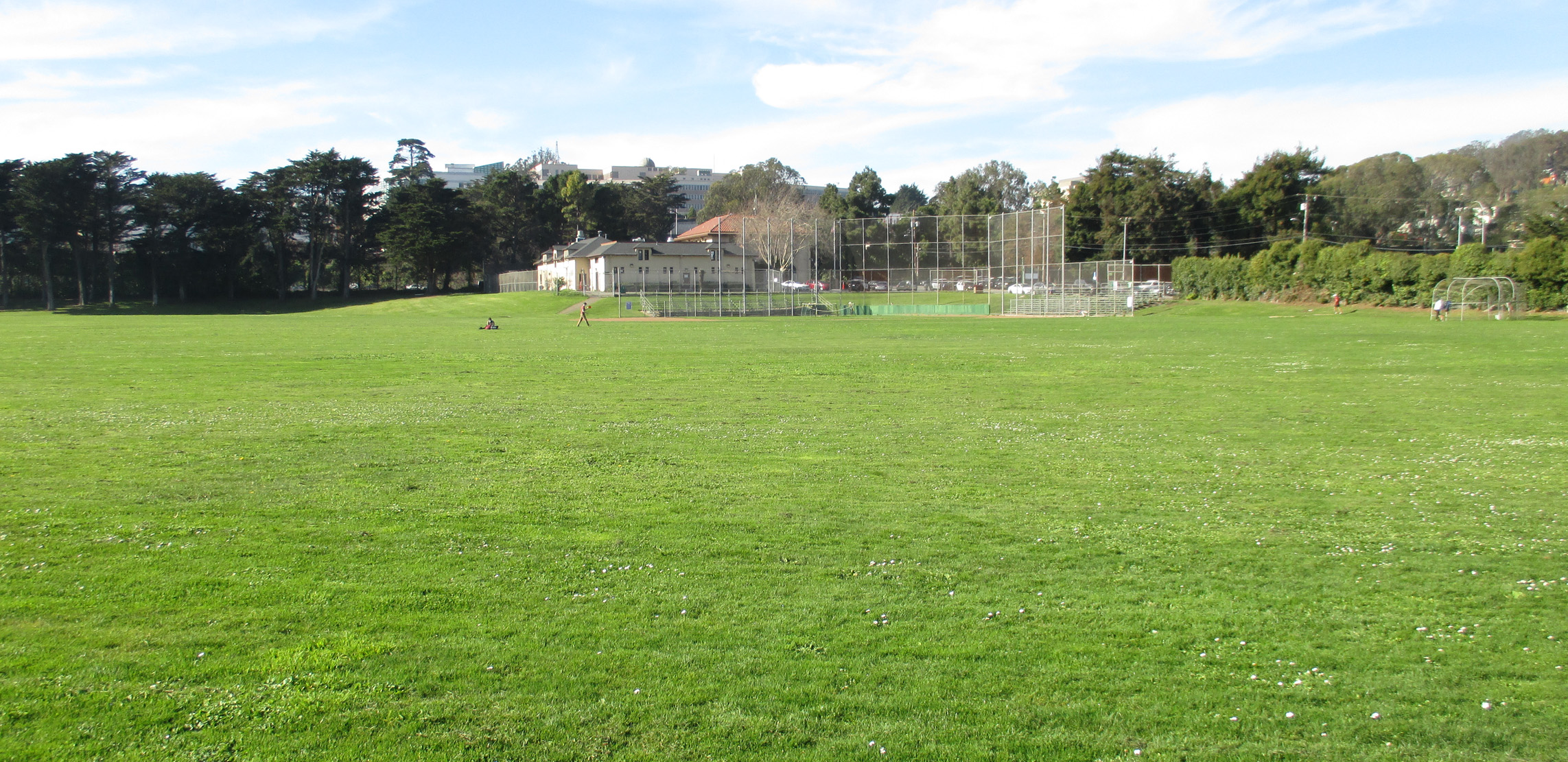
Sweeney Field, January 2021

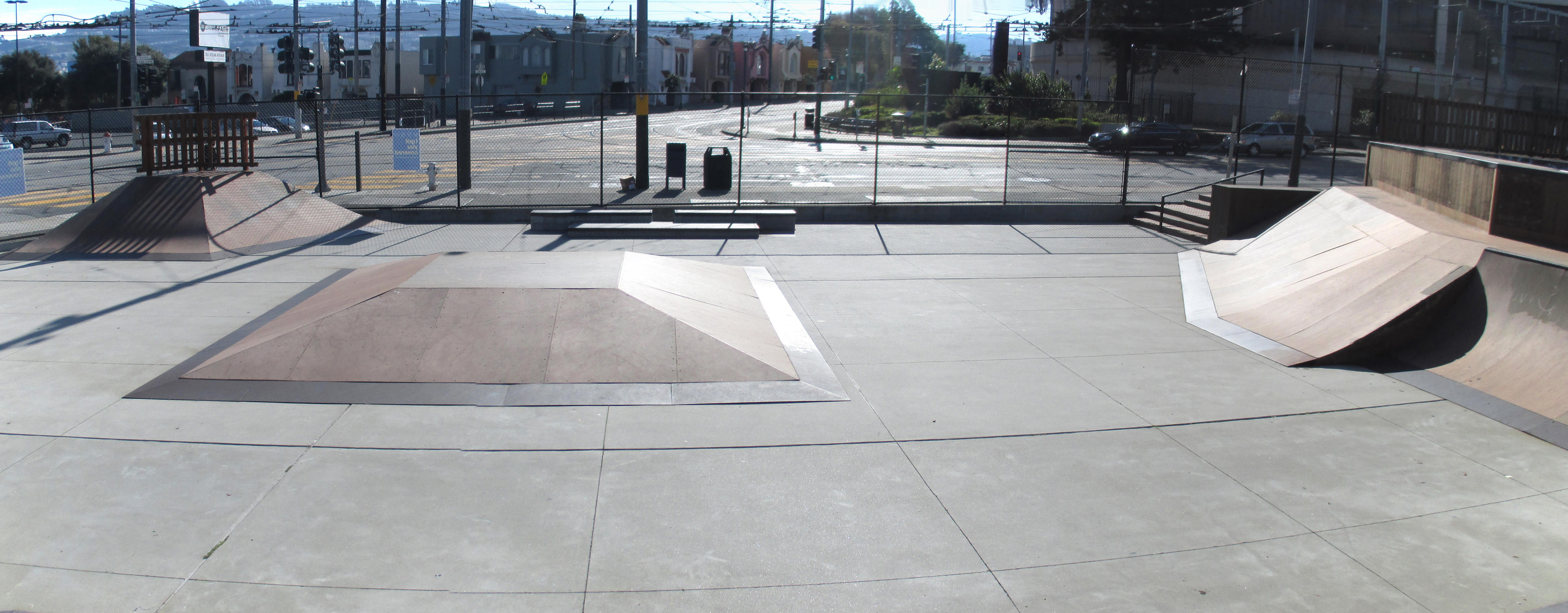
Balboa Skate Park, January 2021

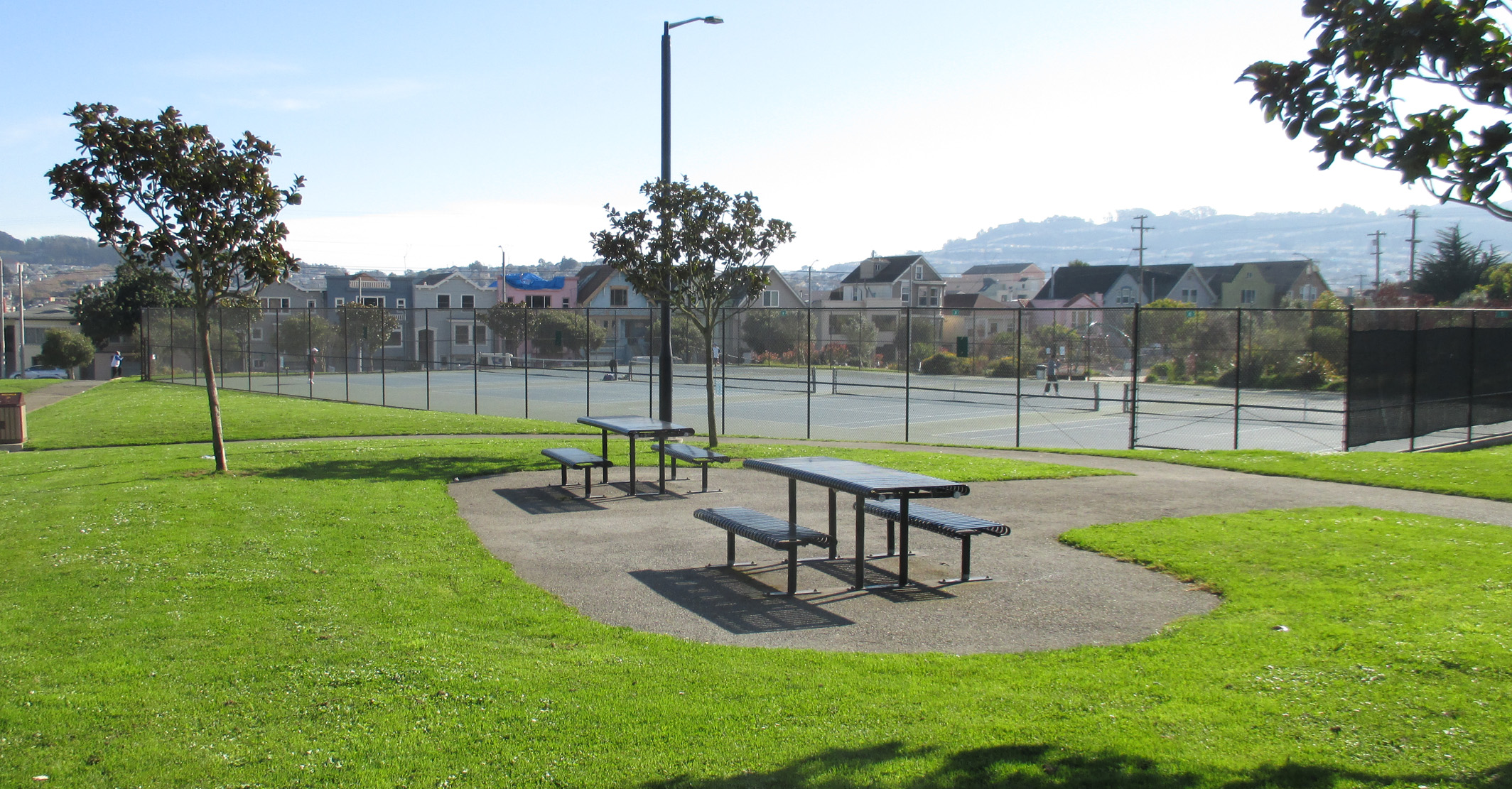
Tennis courts, January 2021

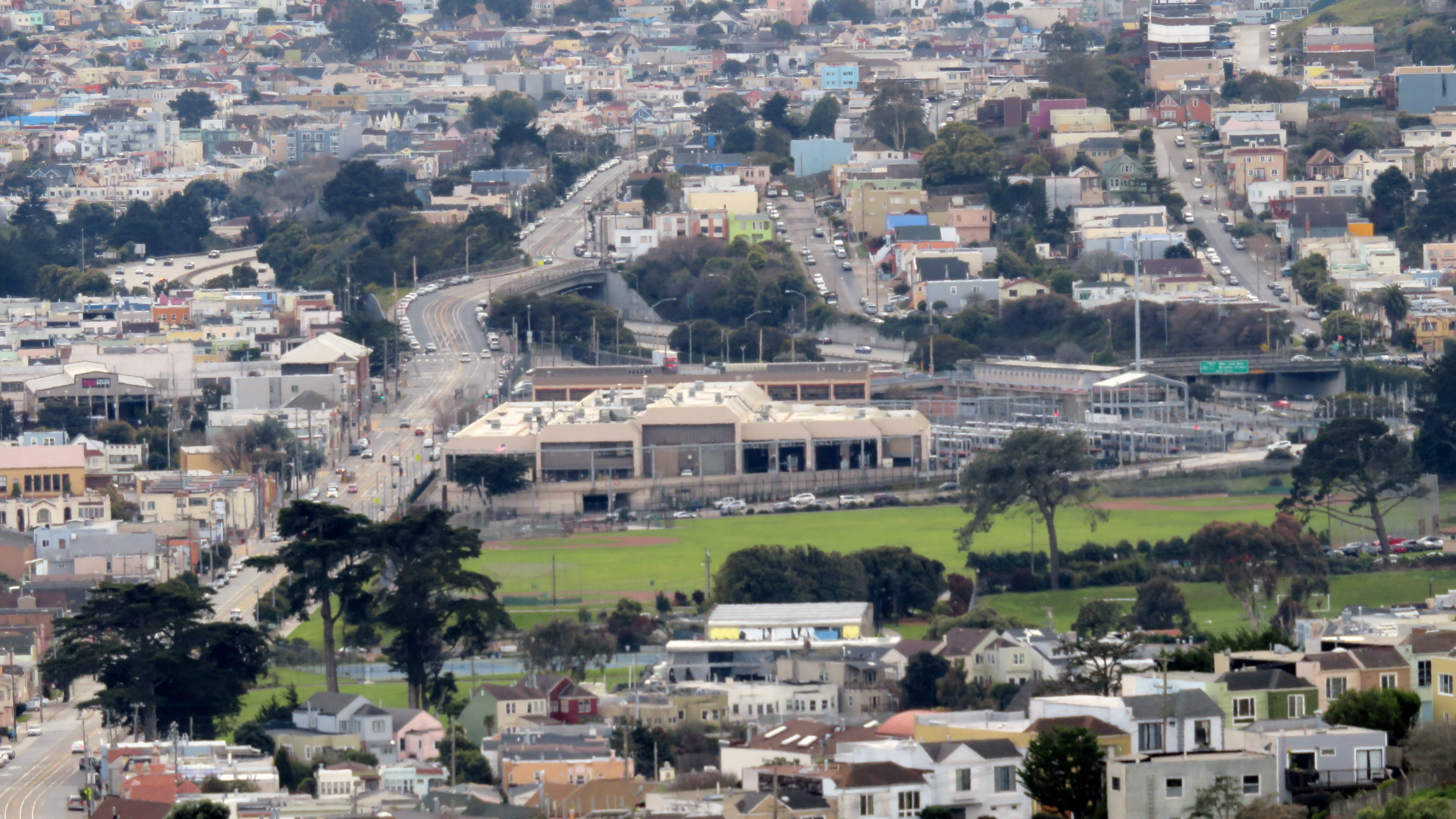
Balboa Park viewed from Diamond Heights, March 2018

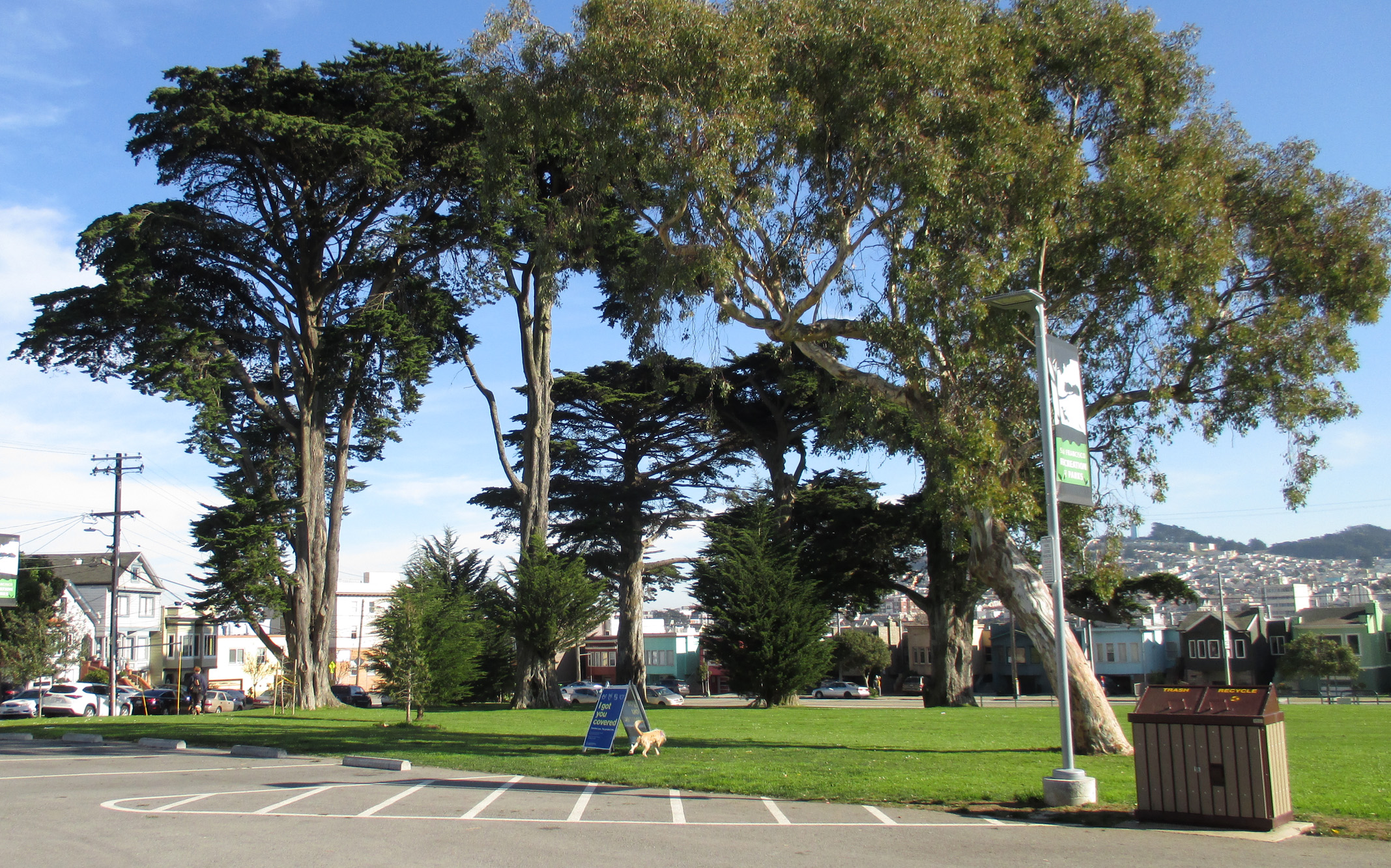

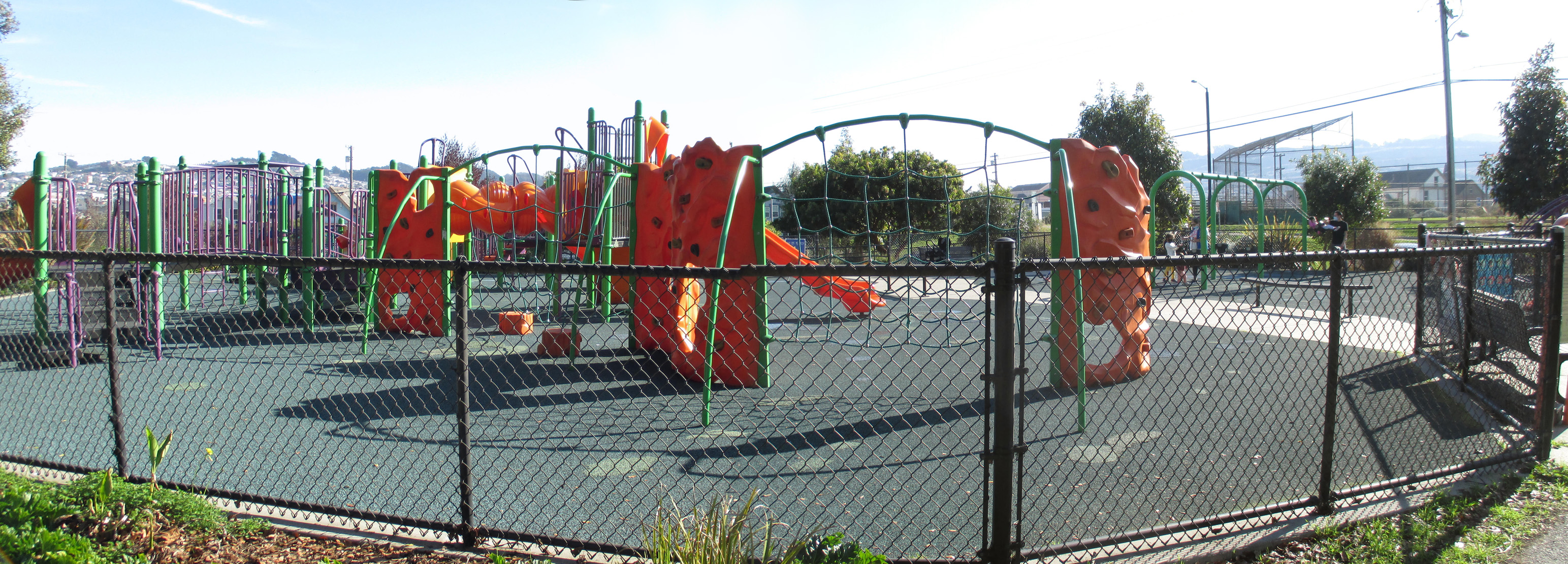

== See also ==
- Balboa Park station
- Balboa High School
