= Philadelphia Whitemarsh RFC =

Rugby union team based in Philadelphia, Pennsylvania, United States

(United States) Philadelphia - Whitemarsh RFC
- Full name: Philadelphia - Whitemarsh Rugby Football Club
- Union: USA Rugby
- Nickname: The Rugby Club
- Founded: Philadelphia 1961, Whitemarsh 1967, - Two RFC Merger 1985
- Ground: Fairmount Park
- Coach: Matt Boccuti
- League: EPRU Men's Club Division 2 (Div II)
1st kit	2nd kit

Official website
- www.pwrfc.com

Philadelphia Whitemarsh Rugby Football Club is an American rugby union team based in Philadelphia, Pennsylvania, US. They are currently members of the Eastern Pennsylvania Rugby Union, the organizational body for the sport in eastern Pennsylvania, and currently play in USA Rugby Men's Club Division II.

== History ==
Philadelphia Whitemarsh RFC formed in 1985 as the result of a merger between the former Philadelphia (founded 1961) and Whitemarsh clubs (founded 1967). Prior to the merger, both clubs were facing a decline in membership. The Philadelphia club had a secure home ground in Fairmount Park and the Whitemarsh club had a good clubhouse, so the clubs merged with the hopes of becoming a more successful club. The club colors became red with blue stripes, and the new logo was a combination of Philadelphia's Liberty Bell logo and Whitemarsh's wallaby. Also included are the founding dates: 1961, 1967, 1985.

Philadelphia Whitemarsh played in the Rugby Super League, the country's highest level of rugby union, from 1998 to 2008, when they withdrew.

The club, looking to rebuild its foundation, moved to Division 3 in Eastern Pennsylvania Rugby Union beginning in the fall of 2009. In 2014 the club moved to Division 2 in the Mid-Atlantic Conference.

== Current club ==
Philadelphia Whitemarsh struggled to rebuild in its first two years in Division 3, sometimes not having enough players to field a side. In the fall of 2009 the club finished 2–5–1 with 11 league points for a 10th-place finish in the twelve-team league. The next year, they finished 1–7–0 with 8 league points for an 11th-place finish.

Things turned around for PWRFC, however, in the spring of 2011. The young players in the club brought in college and high school teammates. Conway Maraki came in as a player–coach and the club began to reform. That spring, the new PWRFC went 3–2 in exhibition matches, both losses coming by a combined 4 points.

In the Fall of 2011, PWRFC ran the table in EPRU Division 3, going a perfect 8–0 and won the EPRU D3 crown. PWRFC continued their winning ways that spring running the table to win the MARFU championship, defeating Virginia RFC in the final 37–32. They advanced to the Final Four in Glendale, Colorado after defeating Gainesville and Syracuse in the USA Rugby Round of 16 and 8, respectively. After defeating the South Bay Rhinos (CA) in the National Semifinal 50–26, they fell to New Orleans RFC in the National Championship Game 36–20, finishing the season with a 14–1 record.
