= Chicago Griffins RFC =

American rugby union team

Chicago Griffins
- Full name: The Chicago Griffins
- Union: USA Rugby
- Nickname(s): Griffins, Griffs
- Founded: 1973; 53 years ago
- Ground: Riis Park Stadium
- President: Charlie Jacobson
- Coach: Paddy Ryan
- Captain: Eric Jacobson
- League: Midwest Rugby Premiership
Team kit

Official website
- chicagogriffins.com

The Chicago Griffins RFC rugby union team was founded in 1973. The team competes in the National Division I Midwest League, USA Rugby's top tier, after the demise of the USA Super League and play their home games at Riis Park in Chicago, Illinois, US.

== History ==
The Chicago Griffins was founded in 1973 by Bob "Doc" Kelly along with Brian Bourke, Mike Elliot, John Carmody, Rick Grigutis, and Tom Powers.

== 2015/16 season ==
Chicago Griffins Men's Team 2016 Midwest Championship Runners Up

The Chicago Griffins finished fourth in the regular season but beat top seeds the Chicago Lions in the semi-finals of the Midwest Championship. The Griffins lost the Midwest Championship final by two points to Metropolis 29–27.

In finishing Runners Up the club qualified for the 2016/17 Gold Cup, a competition played between some of USA Rugby's elite rugby clubs, including current National Champions Mystic River, National Champion Runners Up the Austin Blacks and National Championship Final 8 teams Dallas reds, Rocky Gorge and Metropolis.

=== Midwest League National Division 1 2015-16 season ===
	Team	Pld	W	T	L	Bonus	Total
1	Chicago Lions	14	13	0	1	9	61
2	Metropolis	14	10	0	4	13	53
3	Kansas City Blues	14	9	0	5	10	46
4	Chicago Griffins	14	8	0	6	7	39
5	Columbus	14	5	0	9	11	30
6	Cincinnati Wolfhounds	14	4	0	10	10	26
7	Palmer College Dragons	14	4	0	10	9	26
8	Milwaukee	14	3	0	11	9	21

- 4 Points awarded to the winning team
- 0 Points to the losing team
- 2 Points to each team in the case of a tie
- 1 Bonus Point to a team scoring 4 or more tries
- 1 Bonus Point to a losing team keeping the score within 7 points
- Top 4 advance to playoffs
- Midwest Champion Advances to USA National Championships Final 8

== Rugby 7s ==
=== Men's ===
The Chicago Griffins Men's Sevens yearly participate in the Midwest Men's 7s national qualifiers.

=== Women's ===
Chicago Griffins Women's 7s Team 2016 Midwest Champions

In 2016 the Chicago Griffin's formed their first Women's Sevens team. The team was an instant success, winning both the Iowa City Ducks' Sevens tournament, the Grand Rapids Hard Rock Sevens tournament, and the Midwest Sevens Championship.

In doing so the team won one of 16 places in the 2016 Club Sevens National Championship held in Denver in August 2016. The Chicago Griffins Women's Sevens team won the Shield trophy at the National Championship tournament in Denver.

(In the photo, starting from the left: Top- Cydney Grannon, Kadie Sanford, Rafika Faci, Jess Dombrowksi, Linda Guiner, Christy Bravo, Kayla Enriquez. Bottom-Lauren Trout, Brittany Klimek, Lizzy Bristow, Brittany Biedenbender, Amanda Graziano)
