= Potomac Athletic Club RFC =

(United States) Potomac Athletic Club Rugby Team
- Full name: Potomac Athletic Club Rugby Team
- Union: USA Rugby
- Nickname: PAC Rugby
- Founded: 1988
- Disbanded: 2014 (merger into the Potomac Exiles)
- Ground: (formerly) Wallenberg Field
1st kit	2nd kit

Official website
- www.potomacexilesrugbyclub.com?page_id=204

The Potomac Athletic Club Rugby Team (PAC Rugby) of Washington, D.C. was a rugby union club based in Washington, D.C. PAC was one of the founding members of the now-defunct Super League. PAC Rugby won the USA Men's Division 1 National Championship in 1995. Multiple PAC Rugby players were selected to play for national, and regional representative sides.

In the fall of 2014, the Potomac Athletic Club merged with the Maryland Exiles, forming the Potomac Exiles.

The Potomac Athletic Club's legacy continues through PAC Youth Rugby.
