= OMBAC Rugby =

US rugby union club, based in San Diego, CA

(United States) OMBAC Rugby
- Full name: Old Mission Beach Athletic Club Rugby
- Union: USA Rugby
- Nickname: OMBAC
- Founded: 1966; 60 years ago
- Location: San Diego, California
- Ground: Robb Field
- President: Jason McVeigh
- Coach: Mike Saunders
- Captain: Nico Gilli
- League: Southern California Rugby Football Union
- 2023: Runner Up
Team kit

Official website
- www.ombacrugby.org

Old Mission Beach Athletic Club Rugby, commonly referred to as OMBAC Rugby, is a rugby union team based in San Diego, California. It is directly affiliated with the Old Mission Beach Athletic Club.

== History ==
The club was established in 1966 under the wing of Old Mission Beach Athletic Club (OMBAC) which was founded in 1954. Many past students of San Diego State Aztecs Rugby Club joined, and the OMBAC rugby club entered first division competition two years later in 1968. The club has won 6 national Rugby Sevens titles and 8 national Rugby Fifteens titles.

== Venue ==
After the deconstruction of San Diego Stadium and the San Diego Chargers football facilities, The Little Q Rugby Field was lost forcing OMBAC to find a new home. OMBAC Rugby club now shares a home venue with rival club Old Aztecs at Robb Field in Ocean Beach.

== Notable former players ==
OMBAC players Mike Saunders, Brian Vizard, Kevin Higgins, Steve Gray, Chris Lippert and more recently, Dan Lyle, and Dave Hodges, have captained the United States national rugby union team in international competition.

OMBAC was represented in the 2007 Rugby World Cup by team members Todd Clever, Tui Osborne and Dan Payne. Former OMBAC player Will Hafu has played internationally for Tonga and also played professionally in England for Moseley RFC.

== National Championships ==
OMBAC Rugby has distinguished itself with the following accomplishments:

- 2010 U.S.A. D3 National Champions
- 2006 Rugby Super League Champions
- 1996 U.S.A. National Champions
- 1994 U.S.A. National Champions
- 1993 U.S.A. National Champions
- 1991 U.S.A. National Champions
- 1989 U.S.A. National Champions
- 1988 U.S.A. National Champions

=== National 7s ===
- 2006 U.S.A. 7s National Champions
- 2002 U.S.A. 7s National Champions
- 2001 U.S.A. 7s National Champions
- 2000 U.S.A. 7s National Champions
- 1995 U.S.A. 7s National Champions
- 1985 U.S.A. 7s National Champions

=== National Placement ===
- 2014 Pacific Rugby Premiership Third place
- 2003 Super League Runners-Up
- 2002 Super League Semi-Finalists
- 2001 Super League Runners-Up
- 2000 Super League Semi-Finalists
- 2000 Third Place U.S.A. National Club Championships
- 1997 Third Place U.S.A. National Club Championships
- 1995 Runners-Up U.S.A. National Club Championships
- 1996 Runners-Up U.S.A. 7s National Club Championship

== First XV Honors ==
This is a list of honors awarded to the OMBAC rugby union team.

- USA Rugby Division I Champions - 1988, 1989, 1991, 1993, 1994, 1996
  - Second place - 1995
  - Third place - 1997, 2000
- USA Rugby National Club Sevens Champions - 1985, 1995, 2000, 2001, 2002, 2006
  - Second place - 1996, 2005, 2007
  - Third place - 1997
- USA Rugby Division III Champions - 2010
- Rugby Super League Championship
  - First place - 2006
  - Second place - 2001, 2003
  - Fourth place - 2000, 2002

== Sponsorship ==
OMBAC Rugby's sponsors for the 2014 Pacific Rugby Premiership are the following:

- Community sponsor - Turner construction company
- Social sponsor - The beachcomber mission beach
- Event sponsor - The Tilted Kilt mission valley
- Kit sponsor - Canterbury
