= New York Athletic Club RFC =

American rugby union club, based in New York City

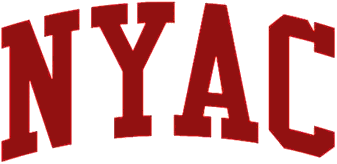
- Full name: New York Athletic Club Rugby Football Club
- Union: USA Rugby
- Nickname: Winged Foot
- Founded: 1973; 53 years ago
- Ground: Travers Island
- President: Ted Vaccaro
- Coach: Mike Petri
- League: American Rugby Premiership
| 1st kit | 2nd kit |

Official website
- nyac.org/rugby

The New York Athletic Club Rugby Football Club is a rugby union team based in New York City that is affiliated with the New York Athletic Club.

== Sponsorship ==
American Rugby Premiership

== Club honors ==
- Rugby Super League Champions: 2005, 2008, 2010, 2012
- US Men's Division I National Champions: 2014
- American Rugby Premiership Champions: 2016
- US Men's Division I National Championship Runner-up: 2001
- US Men's 7s National Championship: 6th in 2000
- 7s North East Regional Champions: 2000

== Notable players and coaches ==
NYAC was coached from 2000 to 2011 by Mike Tolkin, who also served as the defensive coach (2009-2011 & RWC 2011) and Head Coach (2012-2015 & RWC 2015) for the United States national rugby team Former coach Bruce McLane is a regular contributor to Ruggermatrix and current head coach of Iona College.

Phil Bailey, a former rugby league professional and current USA men's national team 15s defensive coach, took over as head coach for the 2014/2015 season. Phil was assisted by another former professional, Neil McMillan. Neil spent time with Ulster, Harlequins, and Sale before moving to New York.

=== USA Eagles ===
Past and current Eagles include:

- Alexander Magleby – hooker (7s), flanker (15s), 2004 7s captain, coach of the US national rugby sevens team
- Mike Petri – starting scrumhalf for the Eagles during the 2011 Rugby World Cup
- Brian Doyle
- Louis Stanfill – starting flanker for the Eagles during the 2011 Rugby World Cup
- Dan Power
- Matt Wyatt
- Jacob Sprague
- Justin Hundley (7s)
- Toby L'Estrange
- Chris Chapman
- Tom Coolican
- Troy Hall
- Derek Asbun
- Seamus Kelly
- Al MacFarland
- AJ MacGinty
- Nate Brakeley
- James Aldridge
- Chris Mattina
