= Boston RFC (United States) =

US rugby union club, based in Boston, MA

(United States) Boston
- Full name: Boston Rugby Football Club
- Union: USA Rugby
- Founded: 1960; 66 years ago
- Ground(s): Union Point Sports Complex, Weymouth, Massachusetts
- President: Joseph Dolan
- Coach(es): Brendan Kelly, Dave Prell
- League: NERFU
Team kit

Official website
- www.brfc.org

Boston Rugby Football Club (also known as BRFC) is a rugby union team based in Weymouth, Massachusetts, US. The club competes in, and is governed by, the New England Rugby Football Union (their LAU), the Northeast Rugby Union (their TAU), and USA Rugby.

The club was established in 1960, but they would not be recognized as a nationally competitive club until they were accepted into Super League, the premier division of club rugby in the United States. The club has also contributed numerous international players to the United States national side.

== History ==
=== 1970-1998 ===
BRFC was formed in 1960 but was not considered a nationally competitive club until 1996 when Beacon Hill Rugby Football Club, a spawn of BRFC that separated from the parent club in 1968, rejoined BRFC to ensure depth and competitiveness. Prior to the merge, the club had been one of the top regional clubs in New England. From 1970 through 1998, the club won twenty-two New England Rugby Football Union championships, but it was never able to attain consistent success at the national level. During that same time period, it reached the national competition four times and earned fourth-place finishes in both 1983 and 1985. During the 1970s and 1980s, Boston RFC was the home club for many forwards, particularly locks, who played for the USA Eagles in international tests.

=== 1998-present: The Super League Years ===
The Super League was formed in 1996 by USA Rugby to create a national competition amongst the premier clubs in the United States. During its first expansion in 1998, Boston RFC was one of two teams invited to join the competition (the other being Philadelphia Whitemarsh RFC). Since joining the competition, Boston has been one of the weakest clubs in Super League play. The club has amassed a 21-45-2 record through the 2007 season. From 2004 through 2006, Boston recorded a 2-18-0 record, and was outscored by 598 points (an average of thirty points per game). Other clubs that compete in the Premier Division have fared much better than Boston against Super League clubs during that period. Beginning in the Fall of 2007 the club began and continues to experience a major resurgence. The Fall of 2007 saw the club win the NERFU league title with a 7–0 record for both the 1st and 2nd sides. This momentum carried into the 2008 RSL season where Boston finished atop the Blue Conference with a record of 5-0-2 and advanced to the quarter-finals of the league. From the Fall of 2007 to the Fall of 2008, Boston was undefeated in 18 straight regular season games. Despite initially struggling in the Super League competition, BRFC has remained one of the better clubs in regional competitions and tournaments since entering the Super League. They have won six New England Rugby Football Union Division I Championships since becoming a member of the Super League. The club fields three sides, which compete at various regional and national levels. The third XV has been met with some success at the national level, having won the USA Rugby National Third Division Competition in 2000.

=== International Tours ===
Since 1977, BRFC has embarked on several international tours, the most recent being to the Cayman Islands in 2000. They have also toured Great Britain (twice), Ireland (three times), Wales, France (three times), New Zealand, and Australia.

== Honors ==
Boston RFC has been recognized with many regional honors. In the club's forty-nine year history, Boston has won twenty-six NERFU championships. They have also attained moderate national success, reaching the USA Rugby Premier Division Competition five times, most recently in 2008.

=== First XV Honors ===
- USA Rugby Premier Division Competition
  - Fourth place - 1983, 1985
  - Eighth place - 1997, 2000
- Division 1 Northeast Rugby Union Champions - 1999
- Division 1 New England Rugby Football Union Champions - 1970, 1971, 1972, 1973, 1976, 1977, 1978, 1979, 1980, 1982, 1983, 1984, 1985, 1986, 1987, 1988, 1989, 1993, 1994, 1996, 1997, 1998, 1999, 2000, 2001
- Eastern Rugby Union Champions - 1983, 1985, 1987, 1988

=== Third XV Honors ===
- USA Rugby National Third Division Champions - 2000

== Sponsorship ==
Boston RFC has individual sponsorships, such as Pioneer Investments, Harpoon Ale, as well as others. These consist of several secondary sponsorships from local and regional businesses.

== Notable players ==
The following is a list of former and current BRFC players that have earned caps for international tests

=== Australia ===
- Bob Egerton, wing, nine international caps

=== Canada ===
- Jim Yeganagi, flanker, two international caps

=== England ===
- Frank Sykes, wing, four international caps

=== United States ===
- Gary Brackett, second row, three international caps
- Jack Clark, second row, two international caps
- Dave Horton, flyhalf, three international caps
- Tom Kelleher, second row, five international caps
- Pat Malloy, second row, one international cap,
- Gerry McDonald, hooker, three international caps
- Boyd Morrison, outside centre, two international caps
- Tim Moser, second row, one international cap
- Manus O'Donnell, prop, one international cap
- Anthony Purpura, prop, ten international caps
- Brian Swords, second row, three international caps
- Kevin Swords, second row, thirty-six international caps
- Tom Vinick, centre, three international caps
- Lin Walton, wing, four international caps
- Mike Waterman, centre, one international cap
- Barry Williams wing, five international caps
- Mark Williams, flyhalf/centre/fullback, thirty-six international caps

=== Wales ===
- Mike Roberts, lock, eight international caps.

== See also ==
- Boston College Rugby Football Club
- USA Rugby
