= Chicago Lions =

US rugby union club, based in Chicago

(United States) Chicago Lions
- Full name: Chicago Lions Rugby Football Club
- Union: USA Rugby
- Nickname: Lions
- Founded: 1964; 62 years ago
- Ground: Hope Field
- President: Jeff Simon
- League: Midwest Rugby Premiership
Team kit

Official website
- www.chicagolions.com

Founded in 1964, the Chicago Lions Rugby Football Club is a USA Rugby club based in Chicago, Illinois, United States.

The Chicago Lions namesake is taken from the two large lion statues that guard the entrance to the Art Institute of Chicago Building.

== Notable players ==
The following is a list of former and current Lions players and coaches that have earned caps for international tests:

=== Niue ===
- Stephen Tapuosi, one international cap

=== Ireland ===
- Paul McNaughton, fifteen international caps

=== England ===
- Gary Wilson, two international caps

=== South Africa ===
- Kitch Christie, coached the 1995 Rugby World Cup winning Springboks
- Willie Kahts
- Harry Viljoen, coached the 2001 Springboks

=== United States ===
- Andre Blom, fullback/wing, thirteen international caps
- John Burke, flanker, two international caps
- Phillipus "Thabu" Eloff, centre, forty-four international caps
- Paul Emerick, centre, thirty-five international caps
- Scott "Beaver" Jones, centre, one international cap
- Christian Long, lock, one international cap
- Jeremy Nash, fullback, two international caps
- Eric Helbig, Wing, three international caps
- Andrew McGarry, prop, two international caps
- Eric Reed, lock/flanker, seven international caps
- Dave Williams, halfback, seven international caps
