= Denver Barbarians RFC =

Rugby union team based in Colorado, US

Denver Barbarians
- Full name: Denver Barbarians Rugby Football Club
- Union: USA Rugby
- Nickname: Barbos
- Founded: 1967; 59 years ago
- Ground: Infinity Park
- President: Max Murphy
- Coach: Corey Jacobs
kit

Official website
- www.denverbarbariansrugby.com

The Denver Barbarians Rugby Football Club is a rugby union team based in Denver, Colorado. The Denver Barbarians have won 4 national championships, dating back to their first DI title in 1990. The club's second title came in 1999, during the height of the Rugby Super League, defeating Belmont Shore RFC 22-18. The Barbarians' third title came in the 2018 DII National Championship, defeating the Detroit Tradesmen in an all-time thriller at Infinity Park, 39-38. The Barbarians added a fourth title with a 49-34 victory over a strong Boise United side in the 2023 DII National Championship in St Charles, Missouri.

The Denver Barbarians are currently being represented on the USA 7s Eagles by Ben Pinkelman and Ke'Von Williams, who have anchored the USA 7s team during the 2017–18 World Rugby Sevens Series.

Ben Pinkelman had an outstanding 2018-2019 year with the USA Eagles and was selected for the HSBC 7's Dream Team. Pinkelman was also selected into the USA Eagles' 2019 Rugby World Cup squad. Pinkelman played in 3 of the 4 pool matches, coming off the bench as an openside flanker.

== Championships ==
The Denver Barbarians Rugby Football Club was founded in 1967. It is an organization that has consistently performed at a professional caliber over the decades. Since its founding, the club has been one of the top-performing men’s rugby clubs in the United States across both 7s and 15s. The National Club 7s Championship has been held every year since 1985 (excluding 2020). Denver has won two National Championships in sevens before USA Rugby assumed tournament oversight. Since 1985, the Barbarians have qualified for the National Club 7s tournament 29 times; placing in the final eight 27 times, the top five 24 times, and have taken second place 8 times.

Type	Competition	Titles	Winning years
National	National Club Championship D1	1	1990
National	National Club Championship D2	2	2018, 2023
National	Rugby Super League	1	1999
National	National Sevens Rugby Tournament	2	1979, 1984
Regional	Rocky Mountain Premiership (D2)	8	2007, 2008, 2009, 2018, 2021, 2022, 2023, 2024
Regional	West Club D1	8	1981,1982, 1985, 1987, 1988, 1989, 1990, 2013
Regional	Rocky Mountain Developmental League	2	2018, 2019
Invitational	Aspen Ruggerfest	11	1970*, 1983, 1984, 1986, 1991, 2003, 2005, 2011, 2012, 2013, 2025
Invitational	Rocky Mountain/Denver 7s	27	1970, 1972, 1973, 1979, 1983, 1984, 1986, 1989, 2001, 2002, 2003, 2004, 2005, 2006, 2007, 2009, 2010, 2012, 2013, 2014, 2015, 2018, 2021, 2022, 2023, 2024, 2025

== Denver Barbarian Eagles ==
With the sport's growth in the ensuing decades, the Barbarians played a larger role in the game, both on and off the field. The club has supplied 7s and 15s players to all levels of select side play, including PRO Rugby, Major League Rugby (MLR), and the US National Side, the Eagles. Barbarians have fielded over 40 national side players, 28 of whom were club players prior to becoming Eagles.

=== 15s Players ===
- Matt Alexander 1998, 1997, 1996, 1995
- Andre Bachelet 1998, 1997, 1996, 1995, 1994, 1993
- Andre Blom 2000, 1999, 1998
- Barry Daily 1991, 1990, 1989
- Mike DeJong 1991, 1990
- Juan Grobler 2002, 2001, 2000, 1999, 1998
- Russ Isaacs 1989
- Rob Lumkong 1998, 1997, 1996, 1994
- Tyson Meek 2006
- Jone Naqica 2003, 2002, 2001
- Fred Paoli 1991, 1989, 1987, 1986, 1985, 1983
- Ben Pinkelman 2019
- Doug Rowe 2005
- Dough Straehley 1984, 1983
- Mark Vandermolen 1987
- Link Wilfley 2003, 2002, 2001, 2000
- Toby Robson 1999
- Samuel Saldi 2003, 2004
- Joseph Saldi III 2002, 2003
- Erik Flink 2005, 2004, 2003, 2002

=== 7s Players ===
- Andre Bachelet 1997, 1996, 1994, 1993
- Doug Brown 1999
- Mike Coyner 2004, 1999, 1998
- Riaan Hamilton 2003
- Steve Laporta 1991, 1990, 1989, 1988
- Bob Lockrem 2002
- Rob Lumkong 1994
- Cody Melphy 2018
- Ben Pinkleman 2016, 2018, 2018 (C), 2019 (HSBC 7's Dream team selection)
- Dave Poquette 1990, 1989, 1988
- Jone Naqica 2005, 2004, 2003, 2002
- Doug Rowe 2003
- Ke'Von Williams 2017, 2018, 2019
- Kevin Whitcher 2006, 2005, 2004, 2002, 2001
- Tyson Meek

== See also ==
- Denver Stampede
