= Travers Island, New York =

Peninsula in New York, US

Coordinates: 40.886°N 73.789°W

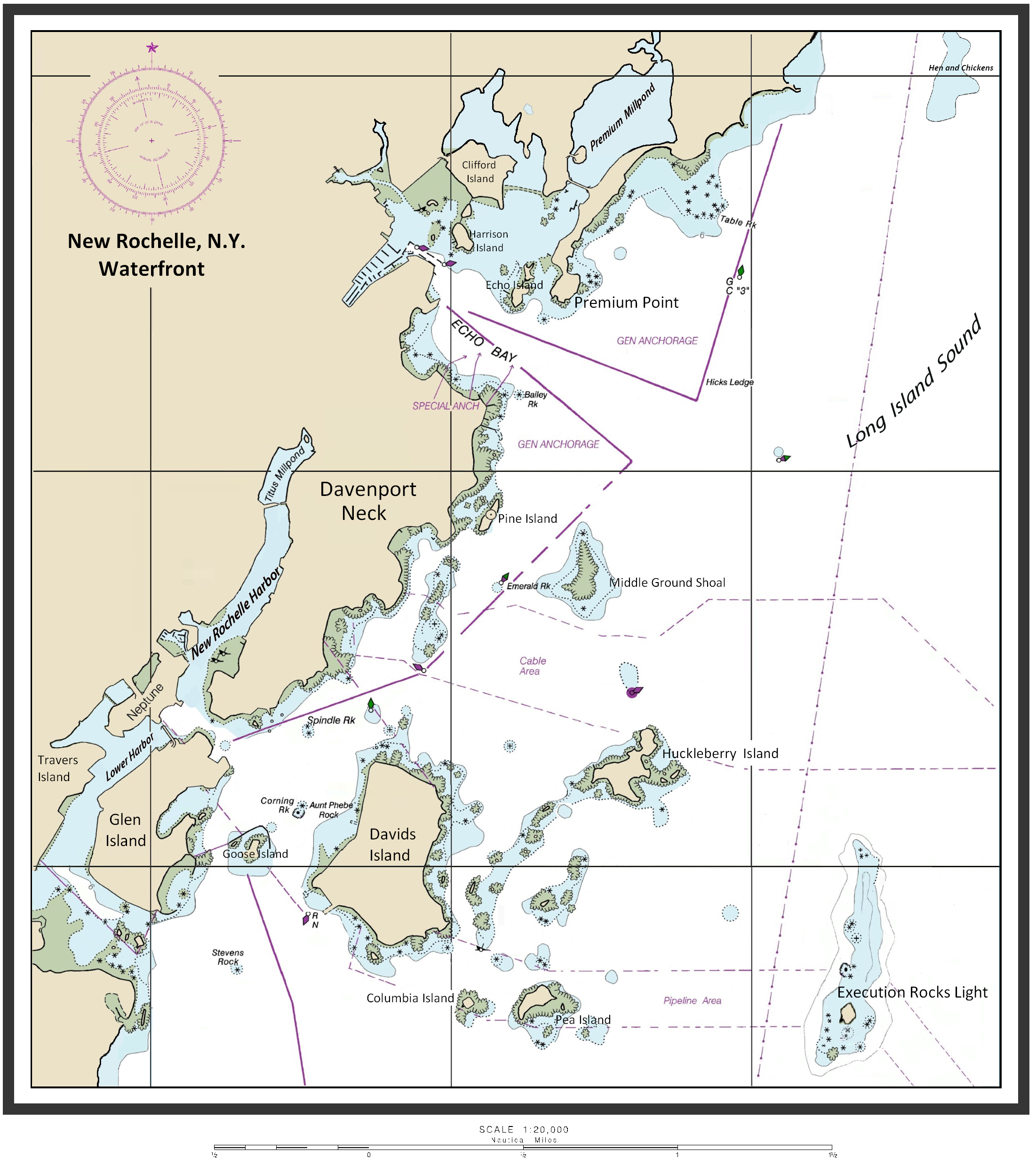
Travers Island is west of Glen Island and in the New Rochelle Harbor Management Area

Travers Island is a former island in Long Island Sound, located in the city of New Rochelle, New York. The island, originally united by a causeway to the mainland, comprises a tract of thirty acres in the Lower Harbor of New Rochelle, situated between Neptune Island, Glen Island, and Hunter Island in New York City's Pelham Bay Park. The narrow strip of water originally making it an island was eventually filled in, converting this tract into a peninsula.

Travers Island currently serves as the New York Athletic Club's summer home. Travers Island hosted the 1903, 1905, and 1906 USA Cross Country Championships. The former island is named after William R. Travers, a longtime President of NYAC.
