= Old Blue R.F.C. =

US rugby union club, based in New York City

(United States) Old Blue RFC
- Full name: Old Blue Rugby Football Club
- Union: USA Rugby
- Nickname: Snorting Bulls
- Founded: 1963; 63 years ago
- Ground: Columbia Soccer Stadium
- President: Jeremy Hanson
- Coach: Sam Windsor
- Captain: Monate Akuei
- League: American Rugby Premiership / Division I / Division III
Team kit

Official website
- www.oldbluerugby.com

Old Blue Rugby Football Club is a rugby union club that competes in USA Rugby club leagues, most notably with their top side in the American Rugby Premiership. The team plays at Columbia Soccer Stadium within the Baker Athletic Complex in New York City, New York.

== History ==
Old Blue is over 60 years old, established in the fall of 1963, by Columbia University Alumni, among them William D Smith, John Wellington, Richard Donelli, Paul Zimmerman and William Campbell, to play winning rugby at the highest level possible. Old Blue started by winning its first 18 matches. The 1st team won 78% of games from 1990 to 2000.

The Old Blue RFC is a founding member of the elite USA Rugby Super League. Old Blue appeared in the first two Super League Finals ever as its inaugural Eastern Conference champions in 1997 and 1998, both years in which it also played in the USARFU Men’s Clubs Finals – the only club ever to reach both elite men’s Finals in consecutive years. They have qualified for the Super League playoffs every year since 2002. In 2002, 2005 and 2006, they again reached the League’s Final Four. The Old Blue RFC D-I side is composed largely of its B and C-side players, with its top tier of players preoccupied with its commitment to the USA Rugby Super League.

Old Blue Rugby Football Club’s initial impact forty-five years ago in official ERU league play proved to be an even more auspicious beginning than that of the Columbia College RFC from which it sprang. In the Spring of 1963, on and around the University’s Morningside Heights campus in New York City, the CCRFC held a series of meetings that ultimately precipitated the creation, previously often discussed, of a senior club in the Fall of 1963. It was to be separate but affiliated with the College club; and with the creation of the Old Blue RFC, aspiration finally became reality.

== Today ==
Old Blue Rugby Football Club competes in matches at various levels of interest, development and rugby skills. The club competes in Men’s D-I Club play. It is supported by the Old Blue Rugby Foundation, created by the club’s founders (whom the club refers to as “SuperBlues”).

Old Blue is made up of amateur players, coaches and administrators. The Club fields four XVs, including Old Boys (“SuperBlues”). Old Blue also provides matches with a third side in Met NY Union B-team play, as well as an Old Boys side. The club and Foundation provide outreach at the collegiate and youth levels with coaching and financial support to the Columbia University RFC and to OB hooker and former Eagle Mark Griffin’s Play Rugby youth organization.

The Club’s uniforms are solid black, patterned after New Zealand’s national team, the All Blacks. Its home fields are Baker Field, 218th Street and Broadway and Van Cortlandt Park, 252nd Street and Broadway in the Bronx.

The club continues to nurture its relationship with the Columbia College RFC and can draw upon a pool of over 90 players. Old Blue continues to attract rugby players from U.S. universities and from foreign countries such as England, Ireland, Scotland, Wales, New Zealand, Argentina, Australia, South Africa, France, Chile and Colombia.

== Achievements ==
Championships

• USA Club 7s Champions
2026

• USA Club XVs Champions
2026

• USA Rugby Super League Finalists
1997 • 1998

• USA Rugby Super League Semi-Finalists
2002 • 2005 • 2006

• USA Rugby Super League Eastern Conference Champions
1997 • 1998

• National Club Runner-Up
1981 • 1986 • 1997 • 1998

• National Club Final Four
1979 • 1980 • 1999 • 2016

• National Club 7s Champions
1993 • 2005• 2026

• National Club 7s Runner-Up
1993 • 2005 • 2014 • 2022

• National Club Division III Champions
2014

• American Premiership XVs Championship
2018
