= Rugby union in the United States =

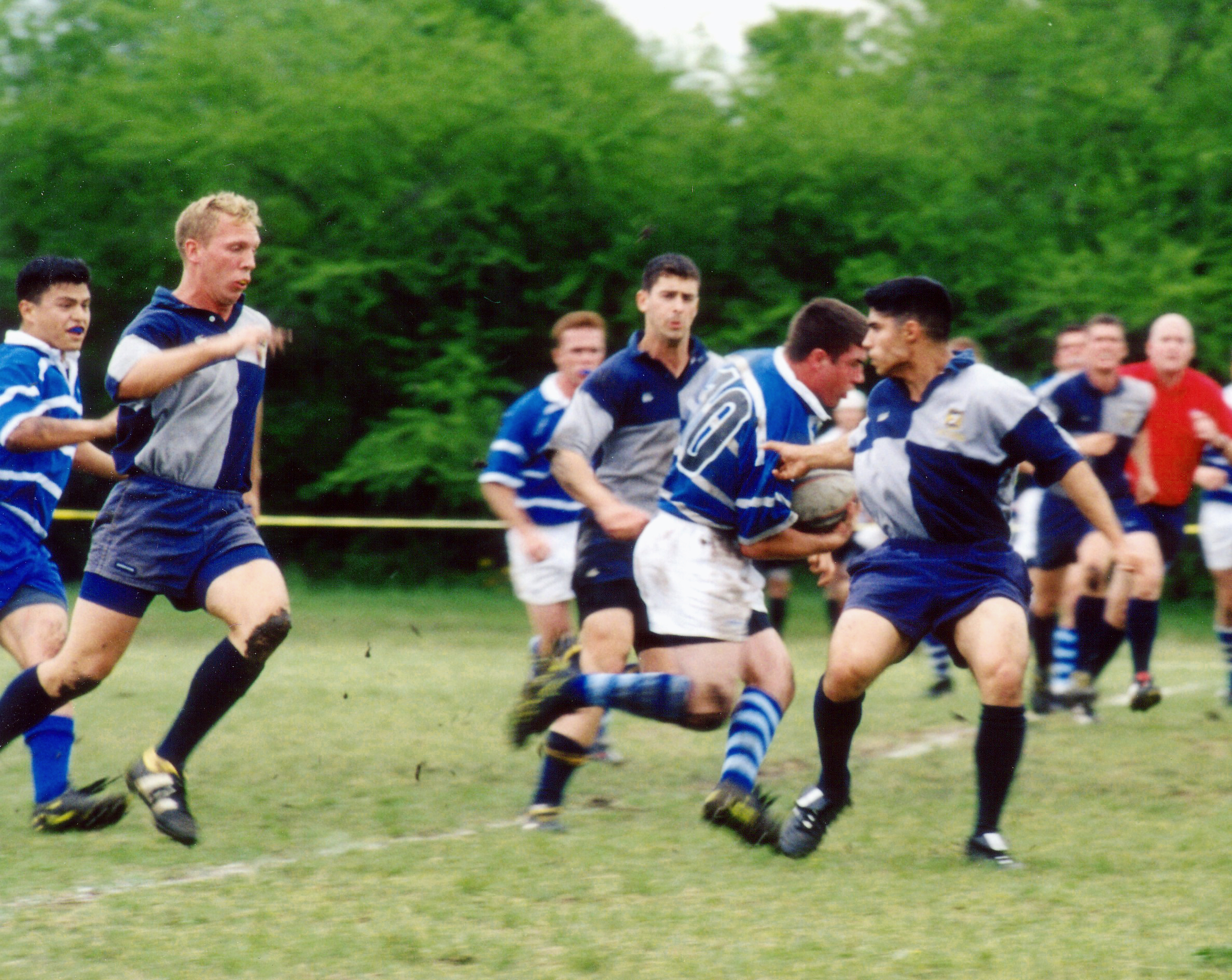
- Air Force and Navy playing a match hosted by the Alamo City RFC (2006)
- Country: United States
- Governing body: USA Rugby
- National team: United States
- Nickname: Eagles
- First played: 1874 – Harvard v McGill
- Registered players: 125,000
- Clubs: 2,673

National competitions
- List: Men's: Major League Rugby; USA Sevens Women's: Women's Elite Rugby

International competitions
- List: Men's: Rugby World Cup; World Rugby Sevens Series Women's: Women's Rugby World Cup; World Rugby Women's Sevens Series

Audience records
- Single match: 61,841 (November 1, 2025); Ireland vs New Zealand (Soldier Field, Chicago)
- Season: 159,941 (average 2,133 per match); 2020 Major League Rugby season

Rugby union in the United States (almost always referred to as simply "rugby") is played at youth, high school, college, amateur, professional, and international levels and governed by USA Rugby. There were over 125,000 players registered with USA Rugby as of 2016. Over 2,500 rugby union clubs exist around the country, including those who are part of college rugby. Professional club competition has existed as Major League Rugby (MLR) since 2017.

An international competition, the USA Sevens is held every February at Dignity Health Sports Park in Los Angeles, draws over 60,000 fans, and is broadcast on Paramount+. The U.S. national team hosts international matches every June, with an attendance of around 20,000. Collegiately, the Collegiate Rugby Championship (CRC) is held every June at rotating venues, draws around 20,000 fans, and is broadcast on The Rugby Network.

== Overview ==
Rugby union, usually referred to in the U.S. simply as "rugby", is played professionally (Major League Rugby), recreationally and in colleges, though it is not governed by the NCAA (see college rugby).

A scrum showing the body positions of the forwards, as well as both scrum-halves and the referee.

Rugby union participation in the U.S. has grown significantly in recent years, growing by 350% between 2004 and 2011. A 2010 survey by the National Sporting Goods Manufacturers Association ranked rugby union as the fastest-growing sport in the U.S.

Rugby union is the fastest growing college sport and sport in general in the United States.

Rugby union was first introduced to the United States in the mid nineteenth century and gained popularity throughout the late nineteenth century. However, it started to decline from the early 1900s after the formation of American football. The U.S. won the gold medal in rugby at the 1920 Olympics and again at the 1924 Olympics, but rugby collapsed in the country after the 1924 Olympics (except in certain hotbeds of rugby such as San Francisco, St. Louis, and New York, which saw continuous competition). Rugby union did not re-emerge in the US until its renaissance in the 1960s and 1970s. The United States of America Rugby Football Union (now known as USA Rugby) was formed in 1975.

The United States men's national team, the Eagles, has competed in all but one of the Rugby World Cup tournaments held every four years since 1987. The U.S. national team plays home matches every June, including international test matches. The United States is a Tier 2 rugby nation, which means that it is not currently competitive at the elite level of the sport, but is one of World Rugby's key development markets. The national team competed in the six-nation Americas Rugby Championship until its cancellation in 2020 due to the COVID-19 pandemic.

USA Rugby fields other national teams. The men's national rugby sevens team has been a "core team" that has participated in every tournament since 2008 of the annual World Rugby Sevens Series. The women's national team reached the quarterfinals of every Women's Rugby World Cup up to the 2021 edition in New Zealand, and won the inaugural Women's Rugby World Cup in 1991. They came 3rd in their group in the 2025 edition in England and failed to progress to the knockout stages. The women's national sevens team is one of the core teams in the World Rugby Women's Sevens Series, which has included a tournament in the U.S. since its first season in 2012–13. The U.S. tournament is held in Los Angeles in Dignity Health Sports Park.

== History ==
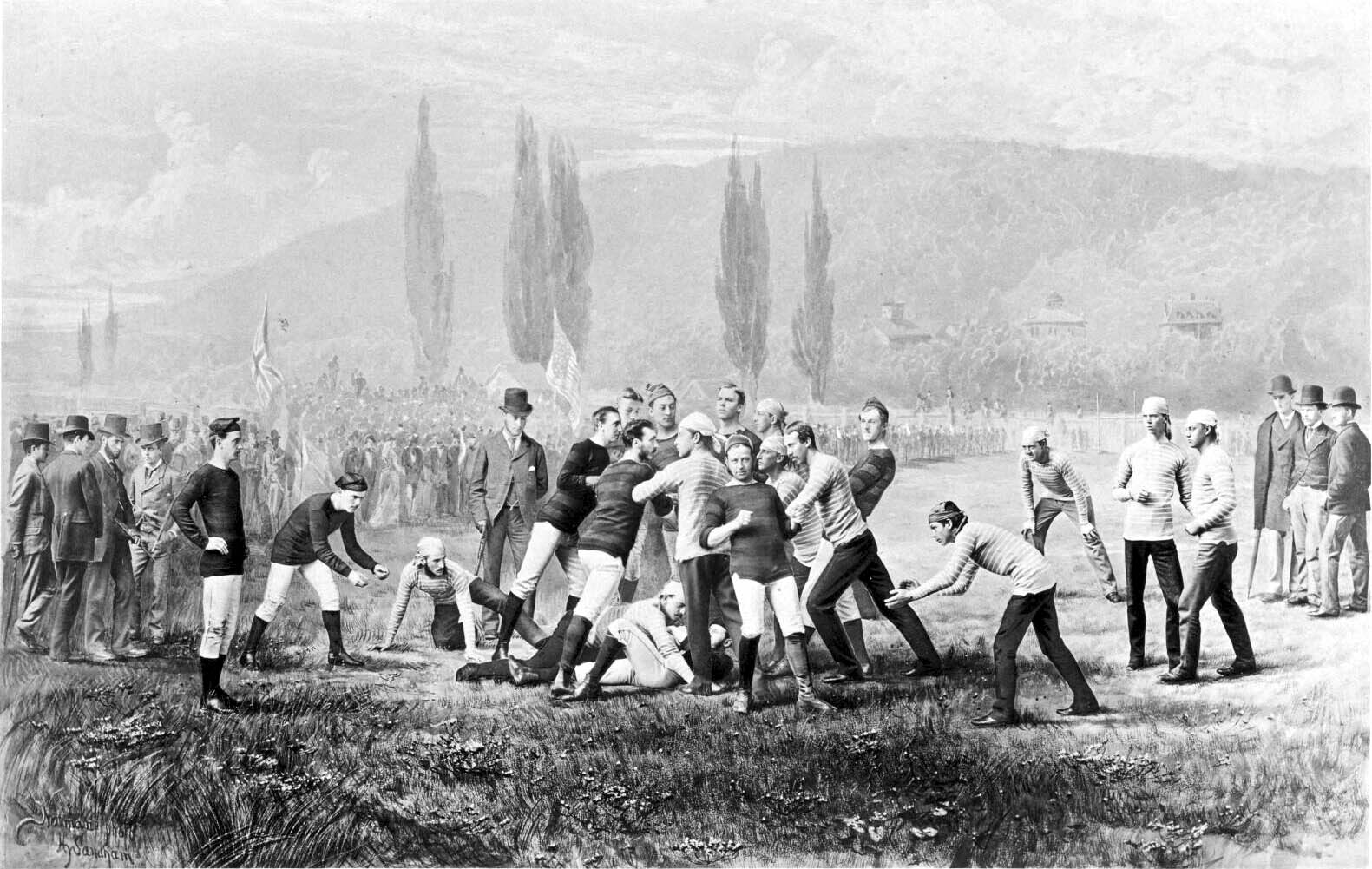
The Harvard v McGill game of 1874

The first recorded rugby union match between two North American schools occurred on May 14, 1874, between Harvard University and McGill University teams.

Rugby grew in the early 1900s, spurred in part by American football's crisis of 1905-06 due to the perception that American football was a violent sport. During this era, rugby was perceived as having the potential to challenge American football as the dominant football code on the west coast. At the 1920 Summer Olympics in Antwerp, a United States rugby team composed largely of players from Stanford University defeated France to win the gold medal. Rugby union was again included in the 1924 Summer Olympics in Paris, where the United States again defeated France for the gold. Despite this success, however, rugby in the United States largely faded away.

Rugby began its revival in the United States in the 1960s and 1970s, as many colleges started club rugby teams. USA Rugby, the body that governs rugby in the U.S., was founded in 1975. On January 31, 1976, the U.S. national team played Australia—in its first official match since the 1924 Olympics—before 8,000 fans at Glover Field in Anaheim, California. Australia won the match 24–12.

The United States national team participated in the inaugural 1987 Rugby World Cup. Rugby in the U.S. received a significant boost in 2009 when the International Olympic Committee voted to reinstate rugby into the Summer Olympics beginning in 2016.

== Governing bodies ==
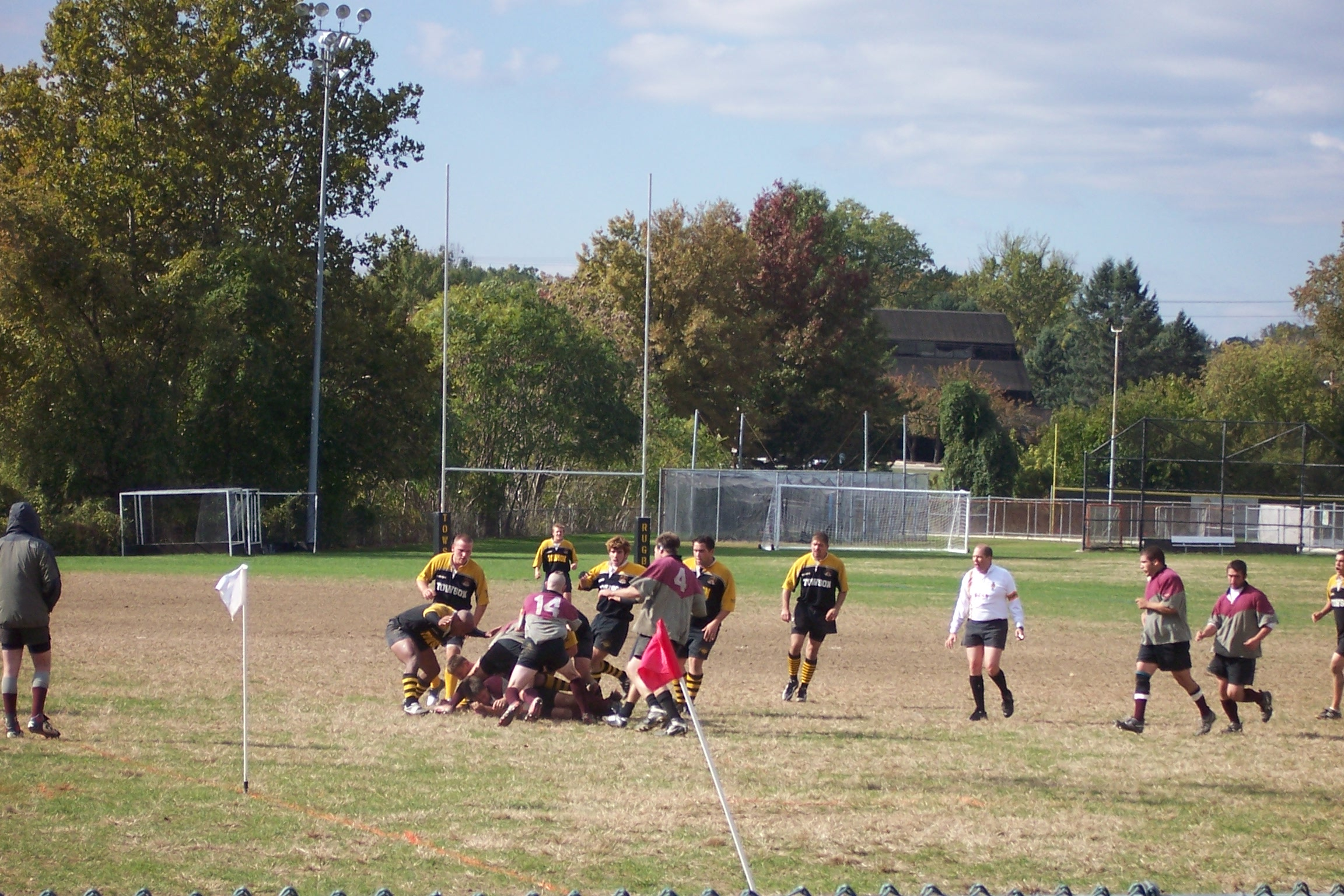
A club match at Towson University in 2005.

Rugby union played anywhere is governed by World Rugby, formerly known as the International Rugby Board, which is based in Dublin, Ireland. It is the governing and law-making body for rugby globally. World Rugby has over 100 member unions.

USA Rugby is the member union of the United States within World Rugby. USA Rugby is responsible for overseeing rugby union domestically and training the various national teams that they put on the pitch.

Rugby union started to grow in the United States in the 1960s. The United States of America Rugby Football Union formed in 1975, and joined World Rugby (then known as IRFB) in 1987.

Within USA Rugby, there are several Geographical Unions (GU's) that are charged with governing a specific region of the country. Within these GU's, there are also Local Area Unions (LAU's), which are responsible for governing a specific region within their respective GU's.

== Growing participation ==
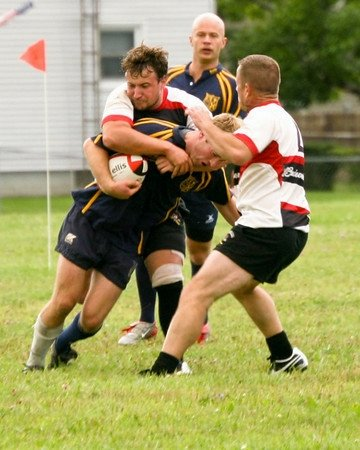
Flint Rogues vs. Michigan RFC in 2009

More than 98,000 people are registered members of USA Rugby. The numbers of registered rugby members are highest in California, New York and Pennsylvania. On a per-person basis, rugby membership is highest in New England and in the Rocky Mountain states of Colorado and Utah.

There are 32,754 men and 11,790 women playing senior-level rugby. Over 34,000 high school athletes (26,212 boys and 8,706 girls) play rugby for their schools or U19 clubs. Over 2,200 pre-teens (1,988 boys and 228 girls) play organized rugby. With over 20,000 registered females in USA Rugby, the U.S. has more female rugby players than any other country in the world. There are 1,582 referees within USA Rugby.

A 2010 survey by the National Sporting Goods Manufacturers Association ranked rugby as the fastest growing sport in the U.S. In 2014 the Sports and Fitness Industry Association reported rugby as the fastest growing team sport in the U.S. during the previous five years. Rugby participation in the U.S. has grown significantly since 2000, growing by 350% between 2004 and 2011. Between 2006 and 2011, the number of high-school rugby players in the U.S. increased by 84%, with 28,000 players in 650 high school programs. By 2010, the number of registered players in the U.S. had grown to over 81,000, moving the U.S. ahead of traditional rugby powers Wales and Scotland in terms of playing numbers, although the percentage of the U.S. population playing is obviously much lower.

College rugby is the fastest growing college sport in the US. Rugby union is also the fastest growing sport in the US.

== Increasing popularity ==
Record rugby attendances in the U.S.
| Attendance | Category | Event | Date | Ref |
|---|---|---|---|---|
| 100,000+ | International tournament (7s) | 2018 Rugby World Cup Sevens | July 20, 2018 | |
| 68,173 | International match (15s) | South Africa v. New Zealand | September 12, 2026 | |
| 61,500 | International match (15s) involving the Eagles | USA v. New Zealand | November 1, 2014 | |
| 37,518 | College tournament (7s) | 2017 CRC Sevens | June 4, 2017 | |
| 14,811 | Professional club match (15s) | 2016–17 English Premiership | March 12, 2016 | |
| 12,085 | Domestic professional club match (15s) | 2024 Major League Rugby final | August 4, 2024 | |
| 11,000 | College match (15s) | 2011 College Premier Division | June 1, 2011 | |

Rugby union's profile in the U.S. has increased as a result of the International Olympic Committee's announcement in 2009 that rugby union would return to the Olympics in 2016. USA Rugby has formally become a member of the US Olympic Committee, allowing rugby players and programs access to Olympic resources.

Attendance at rugby union matches and tournaments has grown significantly in recent years. Attendance for the USA Sevens tournament has grown steadily from 15,800 in 2004, to 52,000 fans at Sam Boyd Stadium in Las Vegas in 2011. The 2011 College Premier Division national championship match between Cal and BYU drew a crowd of 11,000 at Rio Tinto Stadium. A friendly match between the US and Ireland in 2009 drew 10,000 fans to Buck Shaw Stadium in Santa Clara, and a friendly match between the US and Italy in 2012 drew over 17,000 fans to BBVA Compass Stadium in Houston. This was followed by 20,000-strong crowds at BBVA Compass Stadium vs. Ireland in June 2013 and Scotland in June 2014; these records were smashed in November 2014 however when an historic sell-out crowd of 61,500 watched the match against New Zealand at Soldier Field; the match also drew an average TV audience of 927,000 on NBC.

Another significant development in the history of U.S. rugby union came at the 2015 London Sevens, the final tournament of the 2014–15 Sevens Series, when the US won its first-ever championship of a Sevens Series event.

=== Rugby on TV ===
Rugby on TV (Network and basic cable only)
| Competition | Network | TV since |
|---|---|---|
| CRC Sevens | The Rugby Network | 2024 |
| USA Sevens | CBS | 2025 |
| Rugby World Cup | CBS | 2025 |
| Premiership Rugby | The Rugby Network | 2023 |
| Six Nations Rugby | Peacock | 2018 |
| Major League Rugby | ESPN | 2025 |

The announcement in 2009 that rugby union in its rugby sevens format would by admitted into the 2016 Summer Olympics has meant increased TV exposure. Rugby union came onto NBC's radar following the 2009 announcement. NBC has begun broadcasting several rugby tournaments on network TV, particularly rugby sevens tournaments, considered a television friendly format. NBC has shown the Collegiate Rugby Championship each year since 2010. NBC has also broadcast the USA Sevens tournament each year since 2011. Roughly 5.4 million viewers tuned in to watch the 2011 USA Sevens, helping increase awareness of the sport of rugby. Viewership for the 2012 USA Sevens on NBC earned successful ratings (0.7), beating the ratings for an NHL match (0.4) and five college basketball games (0.1–0.3) played that same weekend. The TV ratings on NBC for the USA Sevens and Collegiate Rugby Championships grew 14% from 2013 to 2014, with the 2014 USA Sevens drawing ratings of 0.7 on Saturday and 1.0 on Sunday.

NBC, along with its Universal Sports affiliate network, broadcast ten matches of the 2011 Rugby World Cup—three on NBC and seven on Universal—marking the first time the Rugby World Cup was broadcast live on TV in the U.S. NBC broadcast a November 1, 2014, match between the United States and New Zealand, earning a 0.7 rating. NBC and Universal Sports Network broadcast nine matches (two on NBC, seven on Universal) from the 2015 Rugby World Cup in England. NBC Sports Group has broadcast matches from Premiership Rugby since spring 2016, and began broadcasting the European Six Nations Championship in 2018. The 2018 Rugby World Cup Sevens held in San Francisco set U.S. rugby viewership records—the finals day coverage averaged 1.4 million viewers.

In addition, specialty cable channels have begun broadcasting an increasing amount of rugby. Select international matches and European club matches are shown on WatchESPN.

=== Bidding to host the Rugby World Cup ===
The United States has been considered a likely candidate to host a Rugby World Cup, due to the recent growth and future growth potential of rugby in the U.S., which has been recognized by World Rugby. In 2010, Mike Miller, at the time the CEO of what was then known as the IRB, stated that the U.S. would host a Rugby World Cup, stating that "it's a question of when, not if." USA Rugby CEO Nigel Melville revealed in November 2011 that the U.S. had been asked by the IRB to consider preparing a bid to host the Rugby World Cup, and that USA Rugby was considering bidding for the rights to host the 2023 or the 2027 Rugby World Cup. When the U.S. was then awarded the right to host the 2012 IRB Junior World Rugby Trophy (a tournament now known as the World Rugby Under 20 Trophy), it was seen as the U.S. moving a step closer to hosting a Rugby World Cup. Nigel Melville stated that hosting the 2012 IRB JWRT was "the first step to ... hosting a Rugby World Cup." IRB Chairman Bernard Lapasset has acknowledged that "the USA is a very important and exciting market for Rugby."

The United States has several features that would make it a successful host of the Rugby World Cup:

1. The U.S. is the world's largest commercial market.
2. The U.S. had 81,678 registered players as of 2010, 10th largest in the world.
3. The U.S. has enough stadiums to host a major tournament, with over 100 stadiums with a capacity of 50,000 or larger, and 25 stadiums with a capacity of 80,000 or larger. Many (although not all) of these stadiums could be used for a Rugby World Cup.
4. The Rugby World Cup has never been held in the Americas, so a U.S. hosted tournament would further WR's interest in globalizing the sport of rugby. The Americas is the only continent that has not been selected to host a Rugby World Cup.
5. The number of fans attending high-level rugby tournaments in the U.S. has been increasing. For example, the USA Sevens tournament held annually at Sam Boyd Stadium in Las Vegas drew over 60,000 fans in 2012, exceeding the number of fans attending WR 7s tournaments in traditional rugby countries such as South Africa, Australia, and Scotland. USA Rugby has also successfully staged other international rugby union tournaments, such as the 2012 IRB Junior World Rugby Trophy.
6. A U.S. hosted Rugby World Cup would likely receive a significant number of international fans. The U.S. is a popular tourist destination, ranked #2 in international tourist arrivals and ranked #1 in international tourism receipts. Many major U.S. cities, such as New York, Chicago, Los Angeles, Washington, Boston and Philadelphia can be reached by non-stop flights from many major European cities.
7. The U.S. has successfully hosted other major global sporting events, including the 1994 FIFA World Cup, the 1984 Summer Olympics and 1996 Summer Olympics, and the 2002 Winter Olympics.
8. Rugby tournaments in the U.S. have landed commercial sponsorships from blue-chip companies, such as Toyota, Subway, Anheuser-Busch, Bridgestone and Geico.

On June 10, 2021, the United States formally accepted their bids for the 2027 or 2031 Rugby World Cup as well as the 2029 Women's Rugby World Cup, with their bid campaigns officially launched on October 20, 2021. The United States became the first country to bid on both Men's and Women's World Cups. On May 12, 2022, the United States was awarded the right to host the 2031 Rugby World Cup and 2033 Rugby World Cup (women's), becoming the first country in the Americas to host the Rugby Men's World Cup.

=== Rugby and popular culture ===
Former U.S. presidents Bill Clinton (left) and George W. Bush (right) played rugby while in college.

The popularity of rugby was given a minor boost when it was featured in the fourth season of Friends in the episode The One with all the rugby, broadcast February 26, 1998. Rugby was also featured prominently in the 2008 movie Forever Strong. Rugby was also featured briefly in the film The Departed, by virtue of being set in Boston's Irish community. Executive and Dallas Mavericks owner Mark Cuban was a competitive rugby athlete during his college days.

At least three U.S. presidents have played the sport:

- Bill Clinton. Clinton developed an interest in rugby in England, playing at Oxford. It has been claimed that he played at Little Rock RFC in Arkansas, but they deny this. However, his interest was mainly casual, and he was on the third or fourth team. Clinton's position was lock.
- George W. Bush. Bush was a keen player during high school and university, and was on Yale's 1st XV, and in 1968, he was part of their win over Harvard. Bush's position was fullback.
- John F. Kennedy: Kennedy played for Harvard's team, along with his brother Joseph. Ted Kennedy was also player for Harvard.

== National teams ==
The United States national rugby union team is nicknamed the Eagles. They played their first international in 1912, but did not begin playing regularly until 1976. The Eagles have qualified for six of the eight Rugby World Cups. The U.S. national team also hosts international matches every June, and generally tours against European teams each November.

The United States are currently a Tier-2 rugby nation. The U.S. has been consistently ranked as one of the top 20 teams in the world since the World Rugby Rankings were developed in 2003.

In recent years, Houston, Texas, has hosted U.S. men's national team matches with high attendance levels against countries such as Scotland, Italy and Ireland. In 2018 the U.S. men beat a Tier 1 national team for the first time in a test match when they defeated Scotland 30–29.

=== Rugby World Cup ===
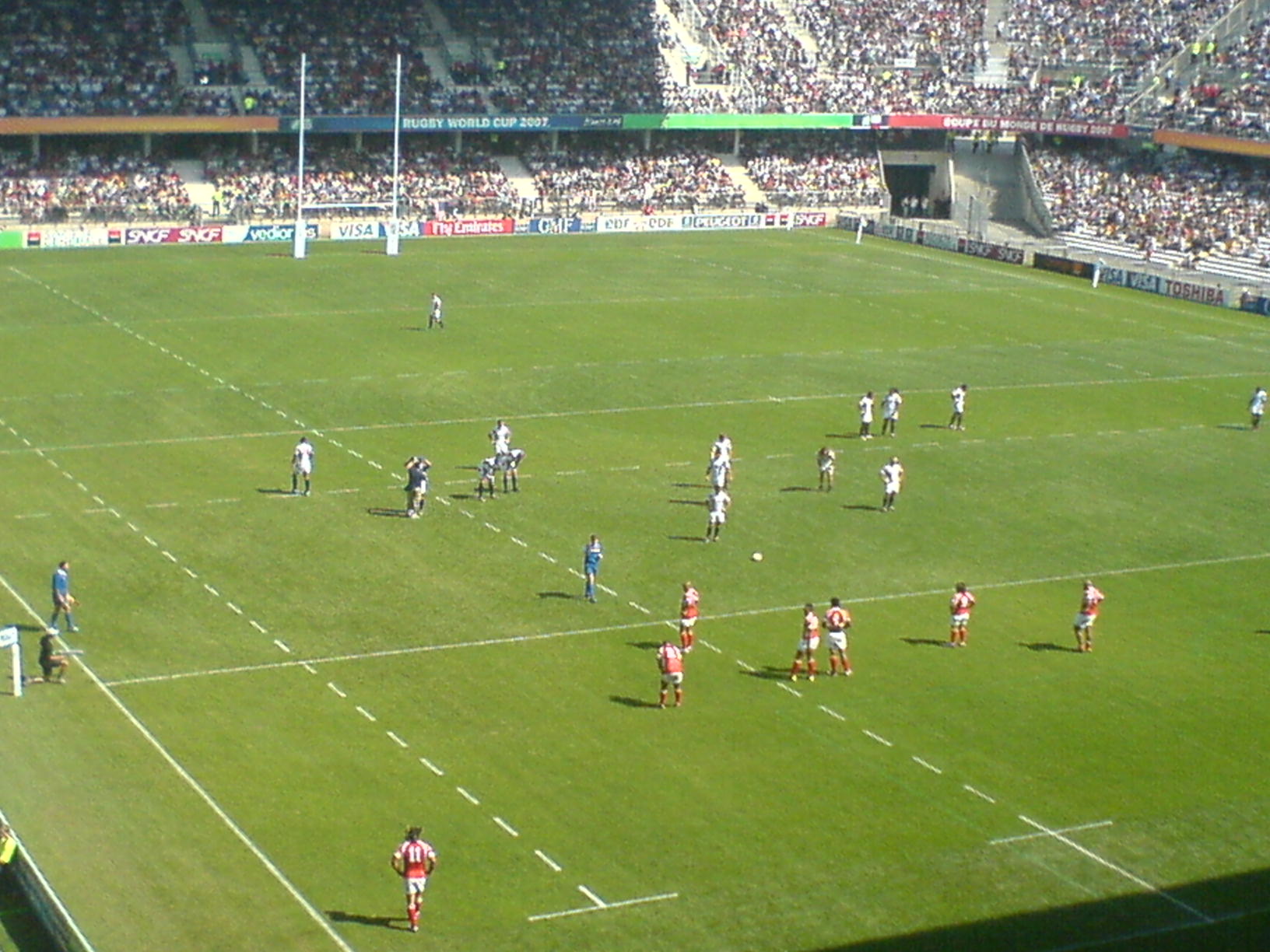
USA vs. Tonga in the 2007 RWC

The U.S. national team has played in six of the seven Rugby World Cup tournaments held every four years since the inaugural 1987 tournament. In the 1987 Rugby World Cup, the United States won one match, beating Japan 21–18 in the pool stage.

At the 1991 Rugby World Cup the United States went 0–3 with losses to New Zealand, England and Italy. The U.S. failed to qualify for the 1995 Rugby World Cup in South Africa. At the 1999 Rugby World Cup in Wales, the U.S. failed to win a match, losing 25–27 to Romania.

The U.S. had one of its better performances at the 2003 Rugby World Cup, winning one game 39–26 against Japan, and narrowly losing to Fiji 18–19. U.S. fly-half Mike Hercus scored 51 points in the tournament, ranked seventh highest in the tournament, even though the U.S. did not advance to the knockout rounds.

The U.S. came away from the 2007 Rugby World Cup in France without a win. One of the team's high points, though, was the winger Takudzwa Ngwenya, who scored against South Africa by out-pacing Bryan Habana for a try, earning "Try of the Year".

The USA played in the 2011 Rugby World Cup in New Zealand. The team's highlights included a 13–6 win against Russia, and a narrow 22–10 loss against tier-one opponent Ireland. The U.S. had a disappointing 2015 Rugby World Cup in England, losing all four matches, including losses to Tier 2 countries Samoa 16–25 and Japan 18–28.

=== Regional competitions ===
The North America 4 was an elite-level IRB-financed tournament that ran from 2006 until 2008. The tournament was contested between four teams, two from the United States and two from Canada.

The United States national team participated in the Pacific Nations Cup from 2013 to 2015. The tournament was intended to strengthen the Tier 2 rugby nations by providing competitive test matches in a tournament format. However, the United States and Canada ended their participation after the 2015 competition.

In 2009, World Rugby launched a new competition, the Americas Rugby Championship, with four teams. The teams included a "USA Selects", effectively the United States "A" (second-level) side; a Canadian team; the Argentina Jaguars, an Argentine developmental side; and an Uruguayan team. These matches between A-sides were not considered official international test matches. The competition was held annually from 2009 through 2014, except in the World Cup year of 2011.

The Americas Rugby Championship was relaunched in 2016 as a Western Hemisphere equivalent to Europe's Six Nations Championship. The new format involves the Argentina Jaguars and the full national teams of the US, Brazil, Canada, Chile, and Uruguay. All matches in the tournament, including those against Argentina Jaguars, are full international tests, and all count in the World Rugby Rankings except those involving Argentina Jaguars.

== Top-level domestic competitions ==
The governing body for World Rugby lifted rugby union's ban on professional rugby following the 1995 Rugby World Cup. Since that time, as other nations have professionalized rugby within their countries, USA Rugby has struggled to transition to a sustainable professional rugby club competition.

=== Amateur era (1997–2016) ===
==== Super League (1997–2012) ====
The Rugby Super League was the national premier Division 1 rugby amateur club competition that ran from 1997 to 2012. The Super League was created in 1996 by the major territorial unions within USA Rugby with the intention of creating a competitive national competition. The inaugural season of the competition saw 14 teams divided into two seven-team divisions: the Western-Pacific Conference and the Midwestern-East Conference.

Aspen won the first championship. Belmont Shore was the most successful club, appearing in the finals every year from 2002 to 2008, until the club left the competition. San Francisco Golden Gate then led the league, appearing in the finals every year from 2009 to 2011.

The size of the league fluctuated over the years. The inclusion of some sub-par clubs and the exclusion of top-performing clubs was controversial issue since the inception of the Super League, called into question whether it was really USA's "premier" competition.

Following the demise of the Super League, USA Rugby formed the Elite Cup in 2013 among the top eight clubs from the previous season's National Division I Club Championship. The competition was divided into two pools of four teams: East, consisting of Boston, Life Running Eagles, New York Athletic Club, and Old Blue of New York; and West, consisting of Denver Barbarians, Glendale Raptors, San Francisco Golden Gate, and Seattle OPSB. However, the competition lasted only one year, as three of the four western members affiliated with the Pacific Rugby Premiership.

==== Regional Premierships (2013–2016) ====
Regional premierships of Division I clubs took the place of the top-level competition in the United States for several years. While this format lives on, it is not longer declared the top-level competition in the U.S., as 2016 saw the introduction of PRO Rugby.

In 2013, seven western clubs announced the formation of the Pacific Rugby Premiership, consisting of three teams from southern California, two from northern California, and two from Colorado. The PRP is a Division 1 competition that began play in spring 2014. The season runs from February to May, with a 12-game regular-season schedule in which teams play each other team twice, culminating in a one-game championship match in May. The teams competing are:

Pacific Rugby Premiership
| Team | Metro Area | Founded |
|---|---|---|
| Olympic Club RFC | San Francisco, CA | 1908 |
| Old Mission Beach A.C. | San Diego, CA | 1966 |
| Denver Barbarians R.F.C. | Denver, CO | 1967 |
| Santa Monica R.C. | Los Angeles, CA | 1972 |
| Belmont Shore R.F.C. | Los Angeles, CA | 1974 |
| San Francisco Golden Gate R.F.C. | San Francisco, CA | 2001 |
| Glendale Merlins | Denver, CO | 2006 |

In July 2014, five eastern clubs announced the formation of the American Rugby Premiership, consisting of two teams from New York, two from Boston, and one from Atlanta. The competition schedule involves eight matches played in a split season, with the first half of the season during September–October, a winter break, and the remaining half of the season in April–May, culminating in a challenge match between the champions of the Pacific and the Atlantic competitions. In 2016, Mystic River Rugby Club became a full member of the ARP, replacing Life RFC in a reformatted competition. The teams competing are:

American Rugby Premiership
| Team | Metro Area | Founded |
|---|---|---|
| Boston RFC | Boston, MA | 1960 |
| Boston Irish Wolfhounds | Boston, MA | 1989 |
| Life RFC | Atlanta, GA | 1980 |
| Mystic River | Boston, MA | 1974 |
| NYAC RFC | New York, NY | 1973 |
| Old Blue RFC | New York, NY | 1963 |

In 2015 eight Midwestern clubs announced the formation of the Midwest Rugby Premiership, consisting of two teams from Chicago, two from Ohio (Cincinnati and Columbus), and one each from Kansas City, Milwaukee, Minneapolis, and Davenport, Iowa. The MRP is a Division 1 competition that began play in fall of 2015. The season runs from September to May, with a 14-game regular-season schedule in which teams play each other twice, a playoff semi final, culminating in a one-game championship match in May. In November 2015, in conjunction with the Red River Premiership the Metropolis RFC, Kansas City RFC, Austin Blacks RFC and Dallas Reds RFC took part in the inaugural USA Rugby sanctioned first round of the Gold Cup. The teams competing are:

Midwest Rugby Premiership
| Team | Metro Area | Founded |
|---|---|---|
| Chicago Lions RFC | Chicago, IL | 1964 |
| Metropolis RFC | Minneapolis, MN | 1960 |
| Kansas City Blues RFC | Kansas City, MO | 1966 |
| Milwaukee Barbarians | Milwaukee, WI | 2012 |
| Cincinnati Wolfhounds | Cincinnati, OH | 1974 |
| Chicago Griffins RFC | Chicago, IL | 1973 |
| Palmer Rugby | Davenport, IA | 1960 |
| Columbus RFC | Columbus, OH | 1975 |

=== Professional era (Since 2016) ===
==== PRO Rugby (2016) ====
The development of a domestic professional rugby competition is seen as a key step in the growth of rugby in the United States. USA Rugby CEO Nigel Melville predicted in 2012 that professional rugby would come to the United States by 2015. Melville was quoted in 2014 as saying "We can do it in two years, it will be city-driven and we will start with six [teams] and we will go from there." U.S. national team assistant coach Justin Fitzpatrick said in 2015 that by 2016 the U.S. will have resolved to create a professional domestic rugby competition.

Griffins Rugby, based in Dallas, announced its goal of becoming a professional rugby club. Jake Abbott became the first professional player to join Griffins from English club Worcester Warriors, and by 2015 the club had signed four professional players.

In November 2015, the Professional Rugby Organization (PRO Rugby) announced that it was launching a USA Rugby-sanctioned professional competition in 2016. Teams played at medium-size venues, with a 12-match schedule from April to July 2016. The five teams were Denver, Ohio, Sacramento, San Diego and San Francisco. On December 21, 2016, the league announced that its investors has pulled funding and that league operations would be suspended indefinitely.

==== Major League Rugby (Since 2018) ====
Major League Rugby is a North American professional rugby union competition that played its inaugural season in 2018. MLR is an initiative driven by existing USA Rugby-member teams, in partnership with private investors, who believe that American rugby can thrive at the highest levels: as a commercial enterprise; as an influential player on the international scene; and as a participation sport at the youth and senior level. MLR played the 2018 season with seven teams, expanding to nine teams for the 2019 season. While the 2020 season was cut short due to COVID-19, the 2021 season will consist of thirteen teams: twelve from the United States and one from Canada.

Major League Rugby implemented its first collegiate MLR Draft in 2020. Players are eligible for draft after 3 years in college at 21 years old. Free agents can try to join teams at 18 years old.

=== Club Sevens Championship ===
The USA Rugby Club 7s National Championship is the top annual American rugby sevens competition organized by USA Rugby. The best sixteen clubs in the country participate each year. The most successful club in the competition is San Diego based–OMBAC, which has won six titles.

== College rugby ==
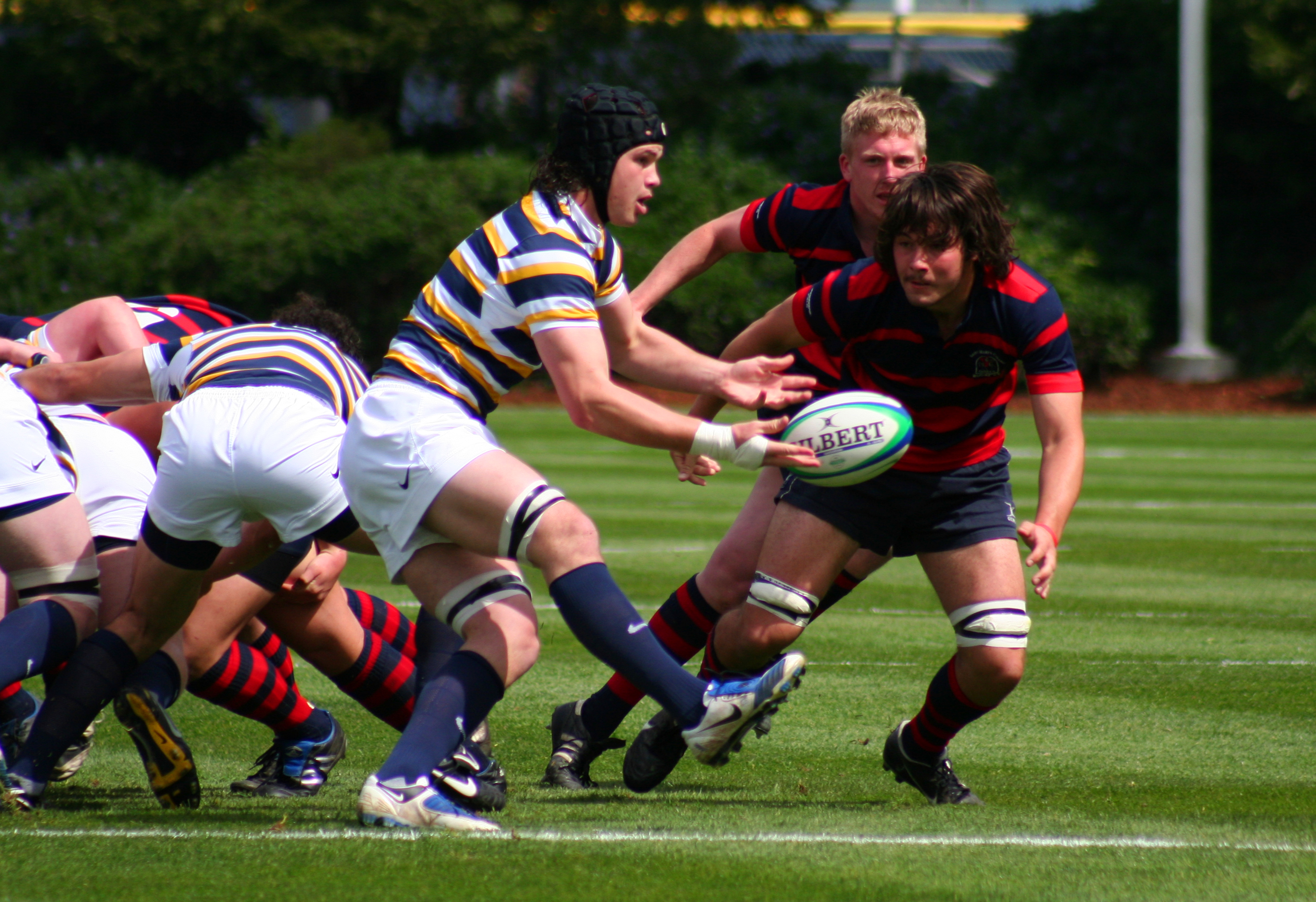
California v Saint Mary's match in 2010

Rugby union is played in universities throughout the United States. More than 1,000 colleges have rugby teams. College rugby is the largest section of USA Rugby's membership. For the 2010–11 season, there were over 32,000 college members and 854 college clubs registered with USA Rugby, roughly a 14% increase from 28,000 college members in August 2008. College rugby continues to grow in popularity, and rugby is one of the fastest growing sports across college campuses.

Women's college rugby is also experiencing significant growth. Rugby was designated as an "emerging varsity sport" by the NCAA in 2002. Initial growth was slow, with only four women's varsity programs in place as of 2008. The sport received a huge boost with the 2009 decision by the International Olympic Committeeee that rugby would return to the Olympics beginning in 2016. Since 2013, 2-4 colleges each year have added a women's varsity program, bringing the total number of programs up to 21 as of 2017.

College rugby includes the National Collegiate Championship competition in fifteens rugby (since 1980). USA Rugby created a smaller Division 1-A competition in 2011 of roughly 30 schools with the intention of refining topflight collegiate rugby. In 2013 a number of top rugby schools formed the Varsity Cup postseason tournament, leading to the perceived existence of two national championships. The Varsity Cup final has been broadcast live on NBC Sports every spring since 2014.

The 2009 announcement that rugby sevens would return to the Olympics in 2016 has led to an increased emphasis in the collegiate ranks on the sevens game, and increasing interest from TV and other media. The highest profile collegiate 7s competition is the Collegiate Rugby Championship (CRC), which is held in June of every year at Talen Energy Stadium in suburban Philadelphia and is televised live by NBC. USA Rugby also operates a college sevens national championship, the USA Rugby Sevens Collegiate National Championships.

Outstanding college rugby players are recognized as All-Americans by USA Rugby. Qualified All-Americans can represent the United States in international tournaments by playing on the United States national under-20 rugby union team.

== High school and youth rugby ==
Rugby union has been growing in the United States at the high school level, both through high school athletic departments and school-sponsored activity clubs and through independent rugby clubs with no school affiliation:

High School Participation Survey of Rugby*
| Season | Schools | Participants | Ref |
|---|---|---|---|
| 1969–70 | 22 | 465 | |
| 1970–71 | 10 | 250 | |
| 1973–74 | 325 | 7,313 | |
| 1975–76 | 325 | 7,313 | |
| 1978 | 15 | 5,333 | |
| 1980–81 | 2 | 42 | |
| 2008–09 | 15 | 779 | |
| 2012–13 | 40 | 1,300 | |
| 2013–14 | 49 | 1,762 | |
| 2014–15 | 43 | 1,599 | |
| 2015–16 | 51 | 1,588 | |
| 2016–17 | 81 | 2,661 | |
| 2017–18 | 83 | 2,593 | |
| 2018–19 | 89 | 3,067 | |
| 2021–22 | 134 | 2,756 | |
| 2022–23 | 79 | 2,381 | |
| 2023–24 | 112 | 2,486 | |
*Surveys are not inclusive of all or most states.

Rugby became the 35th sport of the Massachusetts Interscholastic Athletic Association (MIAA) in 2016, following a 2015 MIAA vote that passed by a wide majority. As of 2015, there were 19 boys’ teams and 5 girls’ teams in Massachusetts, with the majority of the Catholic Conference schools fielding rugby teams.

In 2017, 668 boys single-school and multi-school teams were active during the 15s season.

According to USA Youth and High School Report, youth and high school rugby membership was 44,357 in 2022-23. This figure also included referees and administrators. Of the 44,357 members, about 24,000 were high school players, approximately 25% of which were girls. About 3,400 coaches are registered in youth and high school. California had the most rugby players of any state with 8,077, more than three times the next closest state. Idaho had the highest number of U18 players per capita at 261.4 per 100,000 followed by Hawaii at 235.5 per 100,000. In 2024 USA Rugby reported youth and high School rugby had surpassed 50,000 registrations for the year, signifying a 12% increase from the previous year.

== Regional bodies ==
A list of the Geographical Unions (GU's) and their respective Local Area Unions are as follows:

Governing unions rugby union in the United States
| Super Regions | Geographical Unions | Local area unions |
| Atlantic | Capital Geographical Union | |
|---|---|---|
| Atlantic | Capital Geographical Union | Maryland |
| Atlantic | Capital Geographical Union | Virginia |
| Atlantic | Capital Geographical Union | Washington D.C. |
| Atlantic | Empire Geographical Union | |
| Atlantic | Empire Geographical Union | New York |
| Atlantic | Empire Geographical Union | Northern New Jersey |
| Atlantic | Empire Geographical Union | Southern Connecticut |
| Atlantic | Eastern Penn Geographical Union | |
| Atlantic | Eastern Penn Geographical Union | Delaware |
| Atlantic | Eastern Penn Geographical Union | Eastern and Central Pennsylvania |
| Atlantic | Eastern Penn Geographical Union | Southern New Jersey |
| Atlantic | New England Rugby Football Union | |
| Atlantic | New England Rugby Football Union | Connecticut |
| Atlantic | New England Rugby Football Union | Maine |
| Atlantic | New England Rugby Football Union | Massachusetts |
| Atlantic | New England Rugby Football Union | New Hampshire |
| Atlantic | New England Rugby Football Union | Rhode Island |
| Atlantic | New England Rugby Football Union | Vermont |
| Northern | Mid-America Geographical Union | |
| Northern | Mid-America Geographical Union | Kansas |
| Northern | Mid-America Geographical Union | Missouri RFU |
| Northern | Mid-America Geographical Union | Nebraska |
| Northern | Mid-America Geographical Union | Northwest Arkansas |
| Northern | Mid-America Geographical Union | Oklahoma |
| Northern | Mid-America Geographical Union | South Dakota |
| Northern | Midwest Rugby Football Union | |
| Northern | Midwest Rugby Football Union | Allegheny Rugby Union |
| Northern | Midwest Rugby Football Union | Chicago Area RFU |
| Northern | Midwest Rugby Football Union | Michigan Rugby Football Union |
| Northern | Midwest Rugby Football Union | Minnesota Rugby Football Union |
| Northern | Midwest Rugby Football Union | Wisconsin Rugby Football Union |
| Pacific | Northern California Rugby Football Union | |
| Pacific | Northern California Rugby Football Union | Northern California |
| Pacific | Northern California Rugby Football Union | North and Central Nevada |
| Pacific | Pacific Northwest Geographical Union | |
| Pacific | Pacific Northwest Geographical Union | Idaho |
| Pacific | Pacific Northwest Geographical Union | Oregon |
| Pacific | Pacific Northwest Geographical Union | Washington |
| Pacific | Southern California Rugby Football Union | Southern California |
| Pacific | Southwest Rugby Union | |
| Pacific | Southwest Rugby Union | Arizona Rugby Union |
| Pacific | Southwest Rugby Union | New Mexico |
| Gulf Coast | Texas Geographical Union | |
| Gulf Coast | Texas Geographical Union | Central and Northwest Arkansas |
| Gulf Coast | Texas Geographical Union | North and Central Louisiana |
| Gulf Coast | Texas Geographical Union | Texas |
| Gulf Coast | True South Geographical Union | |
| Gulf Coast | True South Geographical Union | Deep South RFU |
| Gulf Coast | True South Geographical Union | MidSouth RFU |
| Gulf Coast | Carolinas Geographical Union | |
| Gulf Coast | Carolinas Geographical Union | North Carolina RFU |
| Gulf Coast | Carolinas Geographical Union | South Carolina |
| Gulf Coast | Florida Rugby Union | |
| Gulf Coast | Florida Rugby Union | Florida |
| N/A | Independent | |
| N/A | Independent | Georgia Rugby Union |
| N/A | Independent | Hawaii Rugby Football Union |

== See also ==
- History of rugby union in the United States
- USA Rugby
- United States national rugby union team
- United States at the Rugby World Cup
- United States national rugby sevens team
- USA Sevens
- College rugby
- Collegiate Rugby Championship
- Comparison of American football and rugby union
