= Sports in Cincinnati =

Cincinnati is the home of three major league teams, six minor league teams, five college institutions with sports teams, and numerous top-level amateur teams.

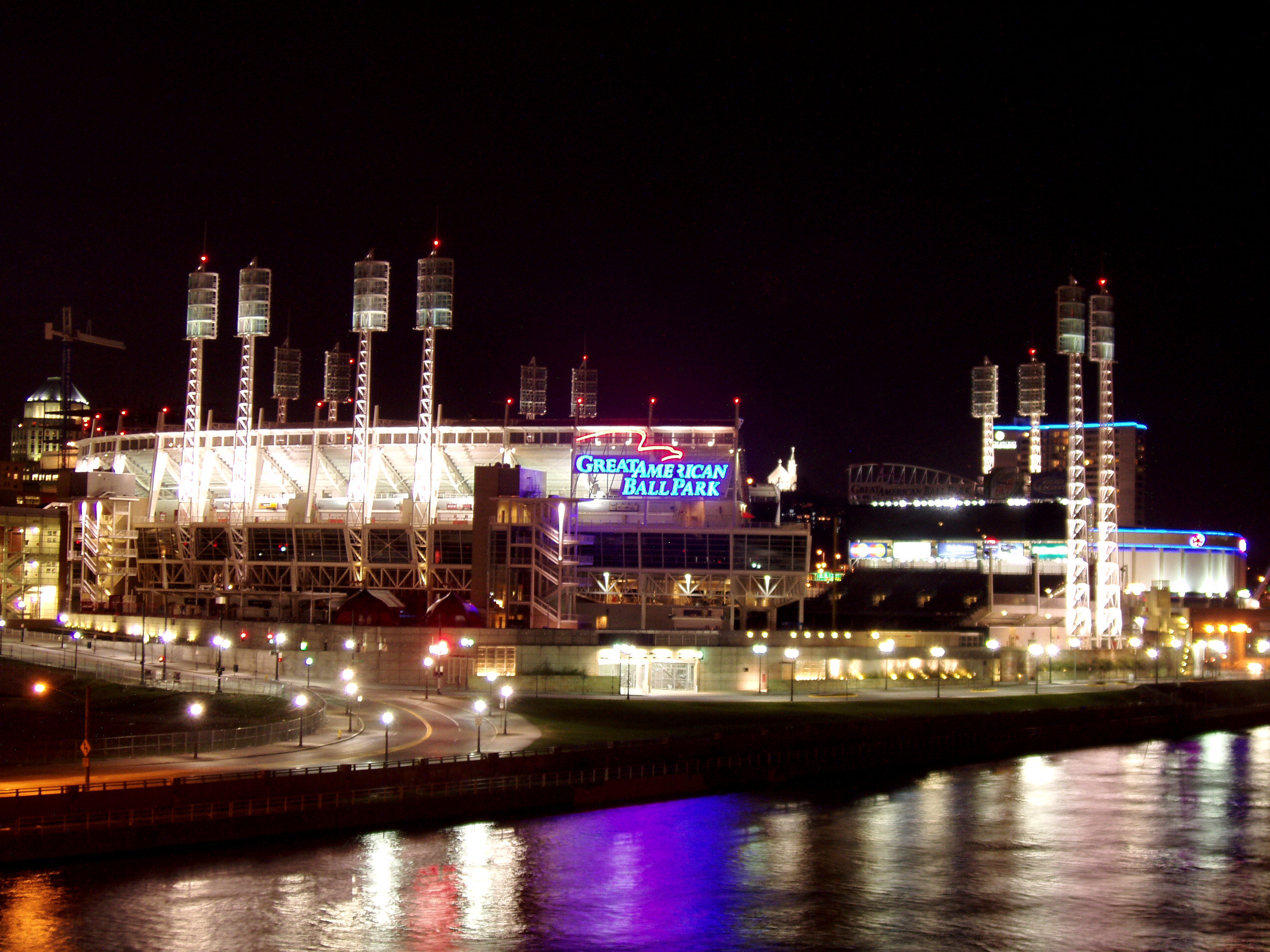
Great American Ball Park, home of MLB's Cincinnati Reds.

== Current teams ==
=== Men's Major League Teams ===
Club	League	Venue	Founded	Championships
Cincinnati Reds	Major League Baseball	Great American Ball Park	1881	5 World Series
Cincinnati Bengals	National Football League	Paycor Stadium	1967	0 Super Bowls
FC Cincinnati	Major League Soccer	TQL Stadium	2019	0 MLS Cups

=== Cincinnati Reds (MLB) ===
5 World Series

- 1919
- 1940
- 1975
- 1976
- 1990

=== Cincinnati Bengals (NFL) ===
0 Super Bowls

=== FC Cincinnati (MLS) ===
0 MLS Cups

1 MLS Supporters' Shield

- 2023

=== Minor Professional Teams ===
Club	League	Venue	Founded	Championships
Cincinnati Cyclones	ECHL	Heritage Bank Center	1990	2
Florence Y'alls	Frontier League	Thomas More Stadium	2003	0
FC Cincinnati 2	MLS Next Pro	NKU Soccer Stadium	2022	0
Kentucky Barrels	AF1	Truist Arena	2025	0
Cincinnati Slingers	International Arena League	Heritage Bank Center	2025	0
Cincinnati Dukes	Continental Football League	TBD	2025	0

=== Kentucky Barrels (AF1) ===
0 Arena Crowns

=== Cincinnati Slingers (IAL) ===
0 Championships

=== Cincinnati Cyclones (ECHL) ===
2 Kelly Cups

- 2008
- 2010

2 Brabham Cups

- 2008
- 2019

=== Florence Y'alls (Frontier League) ===
0 Frontier Cups

=== FC Cincinnati 2 (MLS Next Pro) ===
0 MLS Next Pro Cups

=== Cincinnati Dukes (Continental Football League) ===
0 Championships

=== Universities ===
University	Nickname	League	Division
University of Cincinnati	Cincinnati Bearcats	Big 12	NCAA Division I
Xavier University	Xavier Musketeers	Big East	NCAA Division I
Northern Kentucky University	Northern Kentucky Norse	Horizon League	NCAA Division I
Miami University	Miami RedHawks	Mid-American Conference	NCAA Division I
Thomas More University	Thomas More Saints	Great Midwest Athletic Conference	NCAA Division II
Mount St. Joseph University	Mount St. Joseph Lions	Heartland Collegiate Athletic Conference	NCAA Division III

=== University of Cincinnati Basketball (NCAA D1 Mens) ===
2 National Championships

- 1961
- 1962

=== Other notable Cincinnati teams ===
Club	Sport	League	Venue	Founded	Championships
Cincinnati Wolfhounds	Rugby Union	Midwest Rugby Premiership	Brimelow Fields	1974	0
Cincinnati Dockers	Australian Rules Football	USAFL	Kellogg Fields	1996	1
Cincinnati GAA	Gaelic Football	USGAA	Xavier Rugby Field	2014	0
Cincinnati Cricket Club Tigers	Cricket	Various	Cricket Ground VOA	2015	0
Kings Hammer FC	Soccer	USL League Two	Corcoran Field	2021	0
Cincinnati Cougars	Women's American Football	Women's Football Alliance	Schueler Field	2022	1
Cincinnati Swerve	Indoor Soccer	MASL 3	Game Time Training Center	2022	0
Cincinnati Gladiators	Team Handball & Beach Handball	Various	Eastside Rec Center	2024	0

=== Cincinnati Wolfhounds (Midwest Rugby Premiership) ===
0 Championships

=== Cincinnati Dockers (USAFL) ===
1 Championship

- 1997

=== Kings Hammer FC (USL League 2) ===
0 Championships

=== Cincinnati Cougars (Women’s Football Alliance) ===
0 Championships

=== Ultimate Frisbee ===
- Revolution (2010–present)

== Venues ==
- Paycor Stadium – NFL Football (65,515)
- Great American Ball Park – MLB Baseball (43,500)
- Nippert Stadium – D1 College Football (40,000)
- TQL Stadium – MLS Soccer (26,000)
- Heritage Bank Center – ECHL Hockey & IAL Arena Football (14,453)
- Fifth Third Arena – D1 College Basketball (12,012)
- Lindner Family Tennis Center – Tennis (Center Court: 11,435; Grandstand Court: 5,000)
- Cintas Center – D1 College Basketball (10,224)
- Truist Arena – D1 College Basketball & AF1 Arena Football (9,400)
- Thomas More Stadium – Indie Baseball (4,500)
- Corcoran Field – MLSNP Soccer (1,600)

== Other sporting events ==
The Cincinnati Open, one of the elite nine ATP World Tour Masters 1000 events, is hosted every August in the Cincinnati suburb of Mason across I-71 highway from Kings Island.

Miami University RedHawks: MAC is a Division 1 school located in Oxford, Ohio; 32 miles from downtown Cincinnati.

Kentucky Speedway is a former NASCAR racetrack located in Sparta, Kentucky; 42 miles from downtown Cincinnati.

The Flying Pig Marathon is an annual marathon which winds through downtown Cincinnati and Northern Kentucky.

== Recreation ==
Sports Plus - Cincinnati's Premier Sports Facility is home to two ice sheets that are home to both the Cincinnati Bearcats and Xavier Musketeers ice hockey teams, both of which are members of the American Collegiate Hockey Association. Sports Plus is also home to an inline hockey rink that has a large adult hockey league. There are also 6 basketball courts that host many tournaments, as well as youth and adult leagues.

Within the urban core of the city and its immediate surroundings, the public stairways in Cincinnati offer an urban hiking experience.

Cincinnati and the surrounding metropolitan area has a multitude of disc golf courses.

== Former professional teams ==
American Football

- Cincinnati Bengals (1937–1941), a member of the American Football League (1936). Competed in AFL II (1937), the minor AFL of 1938 (1939), and AFL III (1939–1940).
- Cincinnati Celts, played in the unofficial "Ohio League" and the American Professional Football Association (renamed the National Football League in 1922).
- Cincinnati Reds (NFL), NFL team that played in the 1933 NFL season and the first eight games of the 1934 NFL season.
- Cincinnati Models, team that competed in the Midwest Football League (1935–1940), 1936–1937
- Cincinnati Treslers, team that competed in the Midwest Football League (1935–1940), 1937
- Cincinnati Blades, team that competed in the Midwest Football League (1935–1940), 1938
- Cincinnati Rockers, Arena Football, team that competed in the Arena Football League from 1992–1993.
- Cincinnati Swarm, Arena Football, af2, 2003
- Cincinnati Marshals, Indoor Football, National Indoor Football League, 2004–2006
- Cincinnati Jungle Kats, Arena Football, af2, 2007
- Cincinnati Commandos, Indoor Football, Continental Indoor Football League, 2010–2011, Ultimate Indoor Football League, 2012

Championships (CIFL: 2010,2011) (UIFL: 2012)

- Northern Kentucky River Monsters, Indoor Football, Ultimate Indoor Football League, 2011, Continental Indoor Football League, 2014

Basketball

- Cincinnati Comellos, National Basketball League, 1937–1938
- Cincinnati Royals, NBA team 1957–1972, *Considered a Major League Franchise at the Time*
- Cincinnati Slammers, Continental Basketball Association team 1984–1987

Ice Hockey

- Cincinnati Stingers, World Hockey Association, 1975–1979, *Considered a Major League Franchise at the Time*
- Cincinnati Mighty Ducks, American Hockey League, 1997–2005
- Cincinnati Stingers, Central Hockey League (Minor League), 1979–1980
- Cincinnati Mohawks, American Hockey League, 1949–1952, International Hockey League, 1952–1958

Championships (IHL: 1953,1954,1955,1956,1957) (IHL Regular Season: 1953,1954,1955,1956,1957,1958)

- Cincinnati Wings, Central Professional Hockey League, 1963–1964
- Cincinnati Swords, American Hockey League, 1971–1974

Championships (AHL Calder Cups: 1973) (AHL Regular Season: 1973)

- Cincinnati Tigers (ice hockey), Central Hockey League, 1981–1982

Soccer

- Cincinnati Kids, Major Indoor Soccer League, 1978–1979
- Cincinnati Riverhawks, Professional Soccer, USISL PDL (1997), USL A-League, (1998–2003)
- Cincinnati Silverbacks, Professional Indoor Soccer NPSL, 1995–1998
- Cincinnati Excite, Professional Indoor Soccer, American Indoor Soccer League, 2004–2008
- Cincinnati Kings Indoor Team, Professional Indoor Soccer, Professional Arena Soccer League, 2008–2013
- Cincinnati Saints, Professional Indoor Soccer, Professional Arena Soccer League, 2013–2014
- FC Cincinnati, Professional Soccer, USL, 2016–2018 (Promoted to MLS)

Championships (USL Players’ Shield: 2018)

Softball

- Cincinnati Suds, APSPL, USPL, 1977–1982
- Cincinnati Rivermen, NASL, 1980

Ultimate Frisbee

- Cincinnati Revolution, American Ultimate Disc League, 2013–2016
