= Columbia Rhinos =

American rugby union team

United States
- Full name: Columbia Rhinos Rugby Football Club
- Union: USA Rugby
- Nickname: Rhinos
- Founded: 1967
- Location: Columbia SC
- Ground: Owens Field Park
- President: Sam Carter
- Coach: Phillip de Villiers
- Captain: Alec Wheatley
- League: USA Rugby Division III
Team kit

Union website
- usarugby.org

The Columbia Rhinos RFC is a rugby union club founded in 1967 that plays in Columbia, South Carolina. The team is a Division III club playing in the Carolinas Geographical Union of USA Rugby. The club was selected to host the 2006 and 2007 Division I, II & III National Rugby Club Playoffs as well as the 2006 National Women's Rugby Playoffs. The Club also hosts a rugby sevens tournament the first weekend of December to benefit local children's charities named the Grunk Sevens Tournament.

== League ==
=== Carolinas Senior Men's Division III South 2015–2016 ===
Position	Club											
Position	Club	GP	W	L	T	PF	PA	PD	BT	BL	FF	PTS
1	Charleston Outlaws	5	4	1	0	198	73	125	2	1	0	19
2	Southern Pines	5	4	1	0	155	144	11	3	0	0	19
3	Columbia Olde Grey	5	2	3	0	79	185	-106	2	1	0	11
4	Asheville	4	1	3	0	93	79	14	1	2	0	7
5	Charlotte Barbarians	5	1	4	0	95	139	-44	2	1	0	7

== Playoffs ==
=== Carolinas Senior Men's Division III South 2014–2015 ===
Position	Club	Games				Points			Tries
Position	Club	Played	Won	Drawn	Lost	For	Against	Difference	Tries
1	Olde Grey	2	1	0	1	77	62	+15	
2	Cape Fear Rugby	1	1	0	0	43	33	+10	
3	Asheville Rugby	0	0	0	0	0	0	0	
4	Camp Lejeune Misfits	0	0	0	0	0	0	0	
5	Chapel Hill Warriors	0	0	0	0	0	0	0	
6	Charleston Outlaws D3	0	0	0	0	0	0	0	
7	Charlotte Barbarians	0	0	0	0	0	0	0	
8	Duke Graduates	0	0	0	0	0	0	0	
9	Johnson City Rugby	0	0	0	0	0	0	0	
10	Southern Pines Rugby	0	0	0	0	0	0	0	
11	Triad	1	0	0	1	19	44	-25	
