= New Orleans Rugby Football Club =

NORFC
- Full name: New Orleans Rugby Football Club
- Union: USA Rugby
- Founded: 1973
- Location: New Orleans, Louisiana
- Ground(s): Gretna Park
- President: Kaleb Nelson
- Coach(es): George Sharpe
- Captain(s): Zach Stow
- League(s): True South Rugby Football Union
Team kit

Official website
- www.nolarugby.com

The New Orleans Rugby Football Club (NORFC), founded in 1973, is a men's rugby union team based in New Orleans, Louisiana, United States. The club competes in and is governed by the True South Geographical Union (GU), and USA Rugby.

George Sharpe is the current head coach.

The NORFC practices twice weekly at the Gretna Rugby Pitch located on Gretna Blvd, just off Belle Chase Hwy. in Gretna, Louisiana.

== History ==
The New Orleans Rugby Football Club is currently a member of the True South Rugby Union, Division II & 3. New Orleans Rugby competes against other TSRFU teams such as: Birmingham Rugby Football Club, Memphis Blues Rugby Club, Knoxville Rugby Football Club, Chattanooga Rugby Football Club, Baton Rouge Rugby Football Club and Nashville Rugby Football Club.

NORFC won the USA Rugby South Division II Deep South Pool in 2008, 2009, 2010 and 2011. In 2011, NORFC fielded a 2nd XV in the DIII competition. This team won the Deep South Pool and advanced to the South Finals. New Orleans won the 2011 DII USA Rugby National Championship, defeating defending champions Tampa Krewe. In 2012, New Orleans' DI side won the South union, but lost in the DI national playoffs to the Chicago Lions. That same year, New Orleans' DIII side went 22-0 and won the USA Rugby DIII National Championship. In 2013, the DI side finished third in the 2013 USA Rugby DI Championship, losing in the semi-finals to Seattle/Old Puget Beach, but then beating the Denver Barbarians for third place. In 2014, the DI side finished as runner-up to Life University at the 2014 USA Rugby DI Championship.

== Notable former players ==
Name	Accomplishments
Gary Giepert	
Tim Falcon	
Bob Olsonowski	USA Eagles
Chip Curtis	USA Eagles
Mauricio Urrutia	Chile National Rugby Team
Cameron Falcon	NOLA Gold, USA Eagles
Brennan Falcon	NOLA Gold
Cameron Troxler	NOLA Gold
Billy Stewart	NOLA Gold
Mason Briant	NOLA Gold
Todd Dupre	NOLA Gold
Bobby Johns	NOLA Gold

== High School Rugby Program ==
NORFC created the Louisiana High School rugby program, which includes the following clubs:

- Jesuit Blue Jay Rugby Club
- Brother Martin Crusader Rugby Club
- Barbarians Rugby Club
- Bayou Hurricanes Rugby Club
- St. Paul's High Rugby Club
