= Eno River Rugby =

American rugby team

United States
- Full name: Eno River Rugby Football Club
- Union: USA Rugby
- Nickname(s): The Rage
- Founded: 1991
- President: Jesse Franklin
- Coach(es): Sarah Deane

Official website
- enorugby.com

Founded in 1991, Eno River Rugby, also called the "Rage," is a rugby union club based in Durham, North Carolina. Eno River players come from in and around Durham, playing other teams in the Carolinas Geographical Union and participating in tournaments and playoffs in bordering states.

== Divisions ==
=== Current ===
Women - Eno River Rugby is the oldest women's rugby club in North Carolina and the founding division of the Rage. The club is always seeking women interested in learning and playing rugby. No experience necessary. The team practices at Campus Hills Park in Durham, North Carolina, Tuesday and Thursday evenings from 7-9 PM. The women compete in 15s in the fall and spring and 7s in the summer, traveling throughout North Carolina and the Southeast for tournaments and matches.

=== Disbanded ===
Men - The men's team used to include players 21 and over, a mix of skilled veterans and newcomers. The men's division usually traveled throughout North Carolina and other states for matches, round robins, and tournaments. Unfortunately, this team has disbanded. The current men's rugby team is Tobacco Road Rugby (Formerly known as the Chapel Hill Warriors) in Durham and Raleigh Rugby Vipers in Raleigh. Raleigh Vipers and the

Youth - Known under the youth or "under-19" division, it was the newest division under the Rage and faced some of the best in the North Carolina Rugby Football Union, such as the Chapel Hill Highlanders and schools in Mecklenburg County, North Carolina. This team has disbanded.

== Links ==
- Official Eno River Rugby website
- Eno River Rugby on Facebook
- Official Eno River Rugby Instagram
