= Rocky Mountain Geographical Union =

Rocky Mountain Rugby Football Union
- Abbreviation: RMRU
- Formation: 1967 (as Eastern Rockies), 2014 (to Rocky Mountain Rugby Union)
- Headquarters: Denver, Colorado, United States
- Region served: Colorado; Wyoming; Utah
- Chairman of the Board: Rich Cortez
- President: Anthony Fisher
- Vice President: Kendra Wright
- Treasurer: Bob Lesnanasky
- Website: www.rockymountainrugby.org

The Rocky Mountain Rugby Football Union (RMRU), previously known as the Eastern Rockies Rugby Football Union (ERRFU) from 1967 to 2014, is the Geographical Union (GU) for rugby union teams playing in the Colorado, Utah and Wyoming. It is an association of adult men's and women's rugby teams in the Rocky Mountain under USA Rugby.

== Men's Division 2 ==
- Boulder Rugby
- Denver Barbarians
- Park City Haggis
- Denver Water Dogs
- The Gentlemen of Aspen

== Men's Division 3 ==
- Denver Harlequins
- Colorado Springs Grizzlies
- Queen City Rams
- Northern Colorado Flamingos
- Denver Highlanders
- Littleton Scots
- Denver Barbarians

== Men's Division 4 ==
- Boulder Rugby
- Laramie Lumberjacks
- Colorado Rush
- Marauders Rugby
- Grizzly Old Dudes (GODS)

== Women's Division 1 ==
- Denver Black Ice
- Colorado Gray Wolves
- Utah Vipers

== Women's Division 2 ==
- Boulder Babes
- Denver Black Ice
- Laramie Cold Front
- Salt City Slugs

== Champions ==
West Men's Club Division 1
| Season | Champion |
|---|---|
| 1979 | St. Louis Falcons |
| 1980 | St. Louis Falcons |
| 1981 | Denver Barbarians |
| 1982 | Denver Barbarians |
| 1983 | Dallas Harlequins |
| 1984 | Dallas Harlequins |
| 1985 | Denver Barbarians |
| 1986 | Dallas Harlequins |
| 1987 | Denver Barbarians |
| 1988 | Denver Barbarians |
| 1989 | Denver Barbarians |
| 1990 | Denver Barbarians |
| 1991 | Dallas Harlequins |
| 1992 | Dallas Harlequins |
| 1993 | Kansas City Blues |
| 1994 | Kansas City Blues |
| 1995 | Dallas Harlequins |
| 1996 | Gentlemen of Aspen |
| 1997 | Gentlemen of Aspen |
| 1998 | Gentlemen of Aspen |
| 1999 | Gentlemen of Aspen |
| 2000 | Gentlemen of Aspen |
| 2001 | St. Louis Bombers |
| 2002 | Austin Blacks |
| 2003 | St. Louis Bombers |
| 2004 | St. Louis Bombers |
| 2005 | St. Louis Bombers |
| 2006 | Denver Highlanders |
| 2007 | Denver Highlanders |
| 2008 | Glendale Raptors |
| 2009 | Gentlemen of Aspen |
| 2010 | Gentlemen of Aspen |
| 2011 | Glendale Raptors |
| 2012 | Glendale Raptors |
| 2013 | Denver Barbarians |
| 2014 | Provo Steelers |
| 2024 | Park City Haggis |

*Competition now defunct

*2023-2024 Season a D1/D2 Hybrid Schedule was played

RMRU Men's Club Division 2
| Season | Champion |
|---|---|
| 2002 | Denver Highlanders |
| 2003 | Denver Harlequins |
| 2004 | Denver Harlequins |
| 2005 | Queen City Rams |
| 2006 | Queen City Rams |
| 2007 | Denver Barbarians/Queen City Rams |
| 2008 | Denver Barbarians |
| 2009 | Denver Barbarians |
| 2011 | Northern Colorado Flamingos |
| 2012 | Glendale Raptors |
| 2013 | Glendale Raptors |
| 2014 | Glendale Raptors |
| 2015 | Park City Haggis |
| 2016 | Provo Steelers |
| 2017 | Glendale Raptors |
| 2018 | Denver Barbarians |
| 2019 | Boulder Rugby |
| 2020 | Season Cancelled due to COVID-19 |
| 2021 | Season Cancelled due to COVID-19 |
| 2022 | Denver Barbarians |
| 2023 | Park City Haggis |
| 2024 | Denver Barbarians |

RMRU Men's Club Division 3
| Season | Champion |
|---|---|
| 2012 | Casper Cannibals |
| 2013 | Denver Harlequins |
| 2014 | Queen City Rams |
| 2015 | Queen City Rams |
| 2016 | Denver Highlanders |
| 2017 | Denver Highlanders |
| 2018 | Colorado Springs Grizzlies |
| 2019 | Queen City Rams |
| 2020 | Season Cancelled due to COVID-19 |
| 2021 | Season Cancelled due to COVID-19 |
| 2022 | Queen City Rams |
| 2023 | Colorado Springs Grizzlies |
| 2024 | Colorado Springs Grizzlies |

RMRU Women's Club Division 1
| Season | Champion |
|---|---|
| 2002 | Harlequins Old Girls |
| 2003 | Harlequins Old Girls |
| 2004 | Harlequins Old Girls |
| 2017 | Utah Vipers |
| 2018 | Utah Vipers |
| 2019 | Glendale Merlins |
| 2022 | Colorado Gray Wolves |
| 2023 | Utah Vipers |
| 2024 | Utah Vipers |

RMRU Women's Club Division 2
| Season | Champion |
|---|---|
| 2024 | Boulder Babes |

== See also ==
- Rugby union in the United States
