= Midwest Rugby Premiership =

Rugby union league in the US

- Current season, competition or edition: 2023
- Sport: Rugby union
- Founded: 2015; 11 years ago
- Organizing body: Midwest Rugby Union
- Country: United States
- Most recent champion: St. Louis Bombers Rugby Football Club (2023-24)
- Website: midwest.rugby/premiership

The Midwest Rugby Premiership is a rugby union competition in the United States that serves mainly as the Division I league for the Midwest Conference (National Competitive Region 1), but also includes two teams from the Frontier Conference (American Competitive Region 3). The winner progresses to the national Division I playoffs.

== Format ==
Ten teams are divided into east and west divisions, with each team playing every other team in their group twice (home and away). The season runs from August through November, with the two division winners playing in the final the following May.

== Teams ==
East Division
Team	Metro Area	Founded
Chicago Griffins	Chicago, IL	1973
Chicago Lions	Chicago, IL	1964
Cincinnati Wolfhounds	Cincinnati, OH	1974
Columbus RFC	Columbus, OH	1975
Detroit Tradesmen	Detroit, MI	1978

West Division
Team	Metro Area	Founded
Kansas City Blues	Kansas City, MO	1966
Metropolis RFC	Minneapolis, MN	1960
Milwaukee Barbarians	Milwaukee, WI	2012
Palmer Rugby	Davenport, IA	1960
St. Louis Bombers	St. Louis, MO	1962

== Champions ==
=== By Year ===
Season	Teams	Champion	Score	Runner-up
2018–19	10	Chicago Lions	30–13	Palmer Rugby
2019–20	10	Chicago Lions	29–15	Kansas City Blues
2020–21	Canceled due to the COVID-19 pandemic			
2021–22	12	Chicago Griffins	38–15	Metropolis RFC
2022–23	10	Chicago Griffins	34–28	St. Louis Bombers
2023–24	10	St. Louis Bombers	34–28	Cincinnati
