= MidSouth Rugby Football Union =

The MidSouth Rugby Football Union is the Local Area Union (LAU) for rugby union teams in Tennessee and portions of Arkansas under the True South Geographical Union of USA Rugby. The LAU also currently includes two teams located outside the core area of the LAU:

- One men's club is located in Huntsville, Alabama, in the northern portion of that state. The rest of that state is under the jurisdiction of the Deep South Rugby Football Union, the other LAU under the True South Union.
- One college team is in the Purchase area of Kentucky, a state that is not presently covered by any USA Rugby geographical union.

== Men's clubs ==
- Clinch River
- Chattanooga
- Huntsville
- Johnson City
- Knoxville
- Maryville Highlanders
- Memphis Blues
- Nashville RFC

== Women's clubs ==
- Memphis
- Nashville
- Knoxville

== Men's college clubs ==
- Arkansas State University
- Bryan College
- Freed-Hardeman University (no longer has a team)
- Harding University (no longer has a team)
- Lee University
- University of Memphis
- Middle Tennessee State University
- Murray State University
- Sewanee: The University of the South
- University of Tennessee
- University of Tennessee at Martin
- Tennessee Tech
- Vanderbilt University

== Women's college clubs ==
- Arkansas State University
- Middle Tennessee State University
- Sewanee: The University of the South
- University of Tennessee

== Men's U19 ==
- Spartan Rugby
- Cordova

== Women's U19 ==
- Spartan Rugby
- Maryville
- Karns
- Brighton

== See also ==
- True South Geographical Union
- USA Rugby
- Rugby union in the United States
