= Charleston Outlaws RFC =

American rugby union team

Charleston Rugby Football Club
- Full name: Charleston Outlaws Rugby Football Club
- Union: USA Rugby
- Nickname: Outlaws
- Founded: 1973
- President: Scott McLaughlin
- Coach: Bertrand Valero
- League: USARugby South Div III

Official website
- www.charlestonrugby.com

Charleston Outlaws Rugby Football Club is a rugby union team based in Charleston, South Carolina. The Outlaws compete in Division III Georgia Rugby Union. Charleston has hosted an annual rugby sevens tournament on Memorial Day Weekend since 2003.

== Results ==
2013 D2 Results:

Opponent	Result	Score
at Hilton Head	W	36–29
vs The Citadel	W	66–0
vs Columbia	W	36–13
vs Greenville	W	57–19
at Augusta	W	21–17
vs Renegades	W	38–10
at Old White	L	19–48
vs Fort Bragg	W	49–0
at Cape Fear	W	45–20
vs Old Suttonians	W	48–38

== Playoffs ==
=== Carolinas Senior Men's Division III South 2014–2015 ===
Position	Club	Games				Points			Tries
Position	Club	Played	Won	Drawn	Lost	For	Against	Difference	Tries
1	Olde Grey	2	1	0	1	77	62	+15	
2	Cape Fear Rugby	1	1	0	0	43	33	+10	
3	Asheville Rugby	0	0	0	0	0	0	0	
4	Camp Lejeune Misfits	0	0	0	0	0	0	0	
5	Chapel Hill Warriors	0	0	0	0	0	0	0	
6	Charleston Outlaws D3	0	0	0	0	0	0	0	
7	Charlotte Barbarians	0	0	0	0	0	0	0	
8	Duke Graduates	0	0	0	0	0	0	0	
9	Johnson City Rugby	0	0	0	0	0	0	0	
10	Southern Pines Rugby	0	0	0	0	0	0	0	
11	Triad	1	0	0	1	19	44	-25	
