= Nate Osborne =

Australian–America rugby union coach

- Born: Nathan John Osborne; July 29, 1980 (age 46) Queanbeyan, Australia
- Height: 6 ft 0 in (1.83 m)
- Weight: 215 lb (98 kg)

Rugby union career
- Position(s): Fly-half, Fullback, Center
Amateur team(s)
Years	Team	Apps	(Points)
1985–1996	Queanbeyan Blues		
1997–1998	St Edmund's College, Canberra		
1998	Australian Schoolboys		
1999–2000	Randwick RFC		
2001–2002	Southern Districts RFC		
2002–2005	Easts RFC		
2005–2007	Denver Barbarians		
2007–2016	Metropolis RFC		
Coaching career
- Years: Team
- 2011–2014: Metropolis RFC
- 2014–2015: US Men's XV's (Assistant)
- 2017–2022: New Orleans Gold
- 2022: Old Glory DC
- 2024: Dallas Jackals (Assistant)

Nate Osborne is an Australian–American rugby union coach. He was the head coach of the New Orleans Gold before moving in 2022 to Old Glory DC, both of Major League Rugby (MLR) in the United States.

== Professional rugby career ==
=== Playing career ===
While in his 20s Osborne played as a fly-half with the Denver Barbarians in the Rugby Super League.

=== Coaching career ===
Osborne became the head coach of Metropolis RFC in 2011, and led the team to the quarterfinals in 2014.

Osborne joined the United States national rugby union team as an assistant coach in 2014. He continued with the U.S. national team through to the 2015 Rugby World Cup, where he was the Backs/Attack coach.

Osborne was announced as the coach of the MLR's New Orleans Gold in June 2017 in preparation for the team's inaugural 2018 season. Announced April 1, 2022, Osborne will be the interim head coach for Old Glory DC.
