= Ben Landry =

American rugby union player (born 1991)

- Born: 26 March 1991 (age 35) Pewaukee, Wisconsin, U.S.
- Height: 6 ft 5 in (1.96 m)
- Weight: 270 lb (19 st 4 lb; 120 kg)
- School: Pewaukee School District
- University: University of Wisconsin–Whitewater

Rugby union career
- Position: Lock
Amateur team(s)
Years	Team	Apps	(Points)
2015	Milwaukee Barbarians		
Senior career
Years	Team	Apps	(Points)
2016	Denver Stampede	0	(0)
2018	Glendale Raptors	4	(5)
2018–2019	Ealing Trailfinders	15	(0)
2020	New England Free Jacks	1	(0)
2021–	Seattle Seawolves	14	(0)
- Correct as of 5 April 2022
International career
Years	Team	Apps	(Points)
2016–	United States	25	(5)
- Correct as of 5 April 2020

Ben Landry (born March 26, 1991) is an American rugby union player who plays as a lock for the United States national rugby union team, and the Seattle Seawolves in Major League Rugby (MLR). He previously played professionally with the Ealing Trailfinders of RFU Championship.

Landry attended Pewaukee High School in Wisconsin where he played multiple sports — American football, basketball, and rugby. In college, Landry pursued rugby and became a collegiate All-American, in addition to continuing to play American football and basketball.

Landry debuted for the U.S. national rugby team in early 2016, starting four matches in the 2016 Americas Rugby Championship. Landry took a break from rugby later in 2016 to play American football, trying out for several National Football League teams. Landry returned to the U.S. national rugby team in 2017, and started two matches at lock in the June 2017 internationals, and two matches at flanker in the November 2017 internationals. He also played for the U.S. during the 2018 Americas Rugby Championship. Landry joined the Glendale Raptors for the 2018 inaugural season of Major League Rugby.

On 17 May 2019 Landry was confirmed as leaving Ealing. He was a 2021 mid-season pickup for the Seattle Seawolves of the MLR and was picked up for the 2022 season.
