= Detroit Tradesmen =

- Full name: Detroit Tradesmen Rugby Club
- Union: USA Rugby
- Founded: 1978; 48 years ago
- Location: Detroit
- Ground: Levey Middle School
- President: Zac Pelton
- Director of Rugby: DJ Pinneo
- Coach: Seamus Bannon
- Captain: Linda Thwala
- League(s): Midwest Rugby Premiership Div 1 & Div 3
Team kit

Official website
- www.detroittradesmen.com

The Detroit Tradesmen is an American rugby union team based in Detroit. The flagship team plays in the Midwest Rugby Premiership with an additional team playing in Division III.

== History ==
The Detroit Tradesmen Rugby Club is one of the most established and competitive men’s rugby union programs in Michigan, with a history that dates back to 1978 and reflects both working-class roots and sustained on-field success. Founded in Detroit by a group of players who split from another local club, the Tradesmen were originally made up largely of skilled laborers—carpenters, electricians, and pipefitters—which inspired the club’s name and identity. Their first match in 1978 showed early promise, competing closely despite fielding a short roster, and they quickly built a reputation for toughness and competitiveness.

Throughout the 1980s and 1990s, the club grew in both size and talent, expanding beyond its trades-based origins to include players from a wide range of professions while maintaining its blue-collar culture. This period laid the foundation for long-term success, including consistent appearances in regional and national competitions.

In the early 2000s, the Tradesmen achieved a major milestone by advancing to a Division II Final Four, which led to their promotion into Division I rugby—one of the highest levels of amateur club competition in the United States. They immediately made an impact, going undefeated in their first Division I season and capturing a Midwest championship, establishing themselves as a perennial contender.

Since then, the club has remained a fixture in the Midwest Rugby Premiership, regularly qualifying for playoffs and competing against top clubs across the region. Their sustained success includes multiple Midwest championships and a runner-up finish in the 2016 & 2018 USA Rugby Division II National Championship.

The Tradesmen have also expanded their structure to include multiple sides, such as Division I and Division III teams, allowing for both elite competition and player development within the organization. In addition to traditional 15s rugby, the club has competed on the national stage in 7s tournaments, including appearances at national championships and strong recent performances.

Today, the Detroit Tradesmen Rugby Club continues to compete in Michigan rugby and supports the development of the sport in the Detroit area.
