= True South Geographical Union =

True South Rugby Football Union Geographical Union
- Abbreviation: True South GU
- Formation: 2013
- Region served: Alabama; Arkansas; Florida; Mississippi; Louisiana; Tennessee, United States of America

The True South Geographical Union is the Geographical Union (GU) for rugby union teams playing in the Southern United States for USA Rugby.

True South Rugby Football Union is responsible for governing the following Local Area Unions (LAU's):

- Deep South Rugby Football Union (DSRFU)
- MidSouth Rugby Football Union (MSRFU)

== See also ==
- USA Rugby
- Rugby union in the United States
