= Palmer Rugby =

Palmer
- Full name: Palmer College Rugby Football Club
- Union: USA Rugby
- Founded: 1960; 66 years ago
- Location: Davenport, Iowa
- Ground: Centennial Park
- League: Midwest Rugby Premiership
Team kit

Official website
- www.palmerrugby.com

Palmer College Rugby Football Club is an American rugby union team based in Davenport, Iowa. The team plays in the Midwest Rugby Premiership and is the official rugby team of the Palmer College of Chiropractic, founded in 1897 by D.D. Palmer.

== History ==
The rugby program was started by David Palmer (grandson of the college's founder) in 1960. The men's team won multiple collegiate championships in the 1960s and 1970s. In the following decade, the team moved to the senior club division of USA Rugby, advancing to the national championships four times.

Palmer added a women's program in 2004, established by Tracy Francis-Nguyen. The team reached the national playoffs for the first time in 2022.
