= Arizona Rugby Union =

American Local Area Union

The Arizona Rugby Union (ARU) is the Local Area Union (LAU) for rugby union teams in Arizona. ARU is part of the Southern California Rugby Football Union (SCRFU), which is one of several Geographical Unions (GUs) that comprise USA Rugby.

== Men's Clubs ==
=== Division 2 (National Division 2) ===
- Tempe Old Devils

=== Division 3 (National Division 3) ===
- Camelback
- Northern Arizona Landsharks
- Old Pueblo Lions
- Phoenix RC
- Red Mountain Warthogs
- Scottsdale Blues
- Tucson Magpies

=== Associate Members ===
- Phoenix Storm
- Prescott Blacksheep
- Thunderbird
- Yuma Sidewinders

== Women's Clubs ==
- Northern Arizona Lady Landsharks
- Phoenix Women's Rugby Team
- Scottsdale Lady Blues
- Tempe Women's Rugby Club
- Old Purblo Lightning

== College Clubs ==
Men:

- Arizona State University Men Rugby
- University of Arizona Wildcats
- Grand Canyon University Men's Rugby

Women:

- Women's Rugby at Arizona State University
- University of AZ Women's Rugby
- Grand Canyon University Women's Rugby

== Under 19 Clubs ==
High School:

- Scottsdale Wolves
- Tempe Rugby Club HS (U16, U19)
- Ahwatukee Rugby Club
- Arrowhead Berserkers
- Brophy Rugby Club
- Chandler United
- North Valley Scorpions
- East Valley Eagles RFC
- Northern AZ Cobrafists
- OP Lyons
- Phoenix Firebirds HS
- Red Mountain Knights
- Salpointe Catholic Rugby Club
- Tucson Barbarians
- Tucson Blackbirds
- West Valley Misfits
- White Mountain Highlanders

Youth:

- Scottsdale Wolves Youth
- Eclipse Rugby
- Chandler Crusaders
- North Valley Scorpions
- Phoenix Firebirds
- Laveen Golden Eagles
- Red Mountain Knights
- Tempe Rugby Club Youth (U8-U14)
- White Mountain Highlanders

== Tournaments ==
- The Arizona Rugby Fest now hosted by the Arizona Rugby Union first started by the Scottsdale Blues in 1991 is a premier rugby 15's tournament that is held the first weekend in December each year when the weather is the most enjoyable in Arizona. The event attracts some of the most competitive sr. men's, sr. women's clubxfrom around the nation and offers an exceptionally impressive social program for the rugby fans.
