= Metropolis RFC =

- Full name: Metropolis Rugby Football Club
- Union: USA Rugby
- Founded: 1992
- Ground(s): Sports & Orthopaedic Specialist's Field at Columbus Park
- President: Ron McDonald
- Coach: Jamille Jacobs
- League: Midwest Rugby Premiership/USA Rugby Division I

Metropolis RFC is an American rugby team based in Minneapolis. The flagship team plays in the Midwest Rugby Premiership, with an additional side playing in Division II.

== History ==
The club was founded in 1992 after the merger of Minneapolis RFC (founded 1960) and Metro RFC (founded 1980).

== Honors ==
- Midwest Rugby Premiership (USA Rugby Division I Midwest Conference)
  - 2017
- USA Rugby Division III
  - 2011 (win by B-team)

== Notable former players ==
- (Australia) Nate Osborne
- (United States) Joe Scheitlin
