= St. Louis Bombers Rugby Football Club =

US rugby union club, based in St. Louis, Missouri

(United States) St. Louis Bombers RFC
- Full name: St. Louis Bombers Rugby Football Club
- Union: Missouri Rugby Football Union
- Nickname: Bombers
- Founded: 1962; 64 years ago
- Location: St. Louis, Missouri, United States
- Ground: Emerson Central Fields St. Louis
- President: Ben Ebert
- Coach: Corey Harman Nick Feakes Peter Lang
Team kit

Official website
- www.stlouisbombers.com

The St. Louis Bombers Rugby Football Club is a rugby union team based out of St. Louis, Missouri, United States. The Bombers are former members of the SuperLeague, the premier league in the United States.

In 2023 they came runners up in USA Club Rugby 7s Nationals.

They are the 2024 USA Club Rugby D1 Champions.

== History ==
=== 1960s–1990s ===
The St. Louis Bombers Rugby Football Club arrived on the St. Louis rugby scene in the spring of 1962. Original founding members of the club included Frank Hauff, Gene Gladstone, Tom Jones, Cliff Schlereth, Bob Meyer, and John Himmelman, who the Black side MVP award is named after. The Bombers were a result of a merger between "The Old Blacks" and the "Sisler-Hummel" rugby clubs, two of the most powerful and successful clubs in St. Louis during the 1940s and 1950s. Coached and captained by Frank Hauff from 1962 to 1965, the Bombers immediately took control of St. Louis rugby, winning the Missouri Rugby Union Championship in their first two years and five out of their first six. From 1964 to 1965 the Bombers were undefeated and shut out all league opponents.

In those early days the Bombers played a rugged style of rugby. This was characterized by the coaching philosophy of the day, as quoted from the 1972 Missouri Rugby Union yearbook. "We would rather teach someone who likes to hit how to play rugby, than teach someone who likes to play rugby how to hit".

The Bombers attracted many talented athletes and rugby players during the 1970s and 1980s, but finished as runner-up to the powerful and now defunct St. Louis Falcon's RFC for most of the two decades. Though the Bombers won several tournament titles during this period, the biggest matches were always against the Falcons.

In 1985 Jim Boggeman, Ron Laszewski and a few others created the St. Louis Bomber RFC bylaws that are used by the club today.

The Bombers put one on the Falcons and won a hard fought Missouri Rugby Union Championship in 1980.

=== 1990s–present ===
In 1988, the Bombers won the first in a string of Missouri Rugby Union Championships, and have won this Championship in every year but three. This includes sweeping 1st, 2nd, and 3rd, divisions of the Missouri Rugby Union in every year except one since 1996. The Bombers have also shown well in the USA Rugby Western Club Championships, winning the Championship in 2001.

An exchange program with top-level rugby clubs in New Zealand, such as Auckland Marist and North Harbour Marist, has strengthened the Bombers player ranks over the years.

The Bombers are consistently represented on the USA Rugby Western Select Territorial Team and regularly have players competing for spots on the USA Eagles National Team. Past Eagles include Jim Dierker, Ron Laszewski, John McBride, Chris Schlereth, Danny Fernandez and John Tarpoff.

John McBride has had the job of coaching the Bombers after legend Ron Laszewski.

== Honors ==
- 11 - 1st Division Missouri RFU Championships
- 10 - 2nd Division Missouri RFU Championships
- 11 - 3rd Division Missouri RFU Championships
- 1999 Major League Rugby USA National Champions
- 2001, 2003, & 2004 USA Rugby Western Club Champions
- 2002, 2003, 2004, 2012, & 2013 "Sweet 16" appearances
- 2001, 2003, & 2004 "Elite 8" appearances
