= North Carolina Rugby Football Union =

The Carolina Geographic Rugby Union is the Local Area Union (LAU) for rugby union teams playing in North Carolina and South Carolina. Youth rugby in North Carolina is governed by the North Carolina State Rugby Organization of USARugby, the North Carolina Youth Rugby Union.

== Men's Clubs ==
- hill warriors.org Chapel Hill Warriors Rugby Football Club - NCRU Division II
- Bragg Rugby Football Club (based in Fayetteville, North Carolina) - NCRU Division III
- Cherry Point Bastards Rugby Football Club - NCRU Division IV
- Columbia Olde Grey Rugby Football Club - NCRU Division III
- Camp Lejeune Misfits Rugby Football Club - NCRU Division III
- Triad Rugby Football Club - NCRU Division III
- Cape Fear Rugby Football Club - NCRU Division III
- Duke Grads Rugby Football Club
- Gastonia Rugby Football Club - www.GastonCountyRugby.com
- Eno River Rage Rugby Football Club (based in Durham, North Carolina) - NCRU Division III
- Southern Pines Rugby Football Club - NCRU Division II
- Charlotte Barbarians Rugby Football Club - NCRU Division III
- Charlotte Royals Rugby Football Club
- Wilmington Rugby Football Club "Liberty Ships"
- Asheville Rugby Football Club
- Charlotte Rugby Football Club - www.charlotterugby.com - NCRU Division II
- Raleigh Rugby Football Club - Vipers - Capital Rugby Union Division II

== Boys High School ==
- Ardrey Kell High School
- Charlotte Catholic High School RFC
- Concord High School RFC (DEFUNCT)
- East Mecklenburg High School RFC
- Myers Park High School RFC
- Philip O Berry Academy RFC
- Providence High School RFC
- Rocky River RFC
- William Amos Hough High School
- West Mecklenburg High School RFC
- Ascend Leadership Academy

== Boy's Club Rugby ==
- North Mecklenburg High School RFC
- Chapel Hill Highlanders
- Southern Pines Gators
- Clayton Copperheads
- Triad Bulldogs (DEFUNCT)
- Raleigh Rattlesnakes
- Raleigh Redhawks
- Union County Lions
- Charlotte Tigers
- Greensboro Youth Rugby Association
- Sandhillsharks

== Women's Clubs ==
- Charlotte Rugby Football Club
- Eno River Rugby Football Club
- Ft. Bragg Women's Rugby Football Club
- Raleigh Rugby Football Club - Venom

== Men's Collegiate ==
- AHO (Appalachian State) RFC
- Belmont Abbey College
- Davidson
- Duke
- East Carolina
- Elon
- Guilford College
- North Carolina State
- UNC - Chapel Hill
- UNC - Charlotte
- UNC - Greensboro
- UNC - Pembroke
- UNC - Wilmington
- Wake Forest
- Western Carolina
- Wingate University

== Women's Collegiate ==
- Appalachian State
- Duke
- East Carolina
- Elon
- Guilford
- North Carolina State
- UNC - Greensboro
- UNC - Chapel Hill
- UNC - Charlotte
- UNC - Wilmington
- Western Carolina

== Girl's High School/Club ==
- East Meck (DEFUNCT)
- North Meck
- Myers Park
- Providence (DEFUNCT)
- South Meck HS
- Southern Pines Youth Rugby Harlequins
- TAYRA Capitals
- Northern Guildford Nighthawks
- Drop Kick Divas
- Greensboro Youth Rugby Association
