= Michigan Rugby Football Union =

Sports league

The Michigan Rugby Football Union (MRFU) is the Local Area Union (LAU) for Rugby Union teams in the state of Michigan. The MRFU is part of the Midwest Rugby Football Union (MRFU), one of the seven Territorial Area Unions (TAU's) that comprise USA Rugby.

== Men’s Clubs ==
- Battle Creek
- Detroit RFC
- Detroit Tradesmen Rugby Club Detroit Tradesmen
- Findlay SCARS
- Flint Rogues Rugby Club
- Eastside Anchormen Rugby Club
- Fraser
- Grand Rapids
- Kalamazoo
- Lansing Capital Area Crisis RFC
- Michiana
- Michigan RFC
- Oakland Highlanders
- Toledo Celtics
- Traverse City Blues
- Tri-City Barbarians

== Women’s Clubs ==
- Ann Arbor
- Detroit RFC
- Flint Sirens
- Kalamazoo

== Collegiate Clubs - Men ==
- Bowling Green University
- Calvin College
- Central Michigan University
- Davenport University
- Ferris State University
- Grand Valley State University
- Hillsdale College
- Hope College
- Lake Superior State University
- North Central Michigan College
- Northern Michigan University
- Oakland University
- Michigan State University
- Saginaw Valley State University
- University of Michigan
- University of Michigan-Dearborn
- Western Michigan University
- Wayne State University

== Collegiate Clubs - Women ==
- Central Michigan University
- Ferris State University
- Grand Valley State University
- Michigan State University
- Northern Michigan University
- Saginaw Valley State University
- University of Michigan
- Wayne State University
- Western Michigan University

== Youth Clubs - Boys ==
- Ann Arbor
- Anthony Wayne
- Battle Creek
- Berkley HS
- Birmingham Area Youth Rugby Football Club (Buc Rugby), Birmingham, MI
- Brighton
- Dearborn
- Dexter Devils Rugby Football Club Dexter, MI
- Forest Hills
- Grand Blanc
- Grand Haven
- Grand Rapids Catholic
- Grandville
- Howell
- Kalamazoo
- Kenowa Hills
- Lakeview HS
- Livonia HS
- Lowell
- Knights Rugby Club (KRC), Northville
- Rockford
- Sparta
- Traverse City
- Troy United
- Washtenaw
- West Ottawa

== Youth Clubs - Girls ==
- Grandville Girl's Rugby Club
- Ann Arbor Pioneers
- Berkley HS
- Redford Thurston
- Traverse City Blues
- Toledo Girls Rugby Football Club
- Lakeview Huskies
