= Flint Rogues Rugby Club =

Sports club

Flint Rogues Rugby Football Club
- Union: USA Rugby, Michigan Rugby Union, Division III
- Founded: 1972
- Ground(s): Longway Park, Flint, MI
- President: (United States) Rob Moquin
- Coach(es): (United States) Michael Mize, Jaylin Steedman, Nick Kiessel
- Captain(s): (United States) Connor Kovacs
- League(s): Midwest Rugby Division III, Eastern Conference, Northern League

Official website
- www.flintrugby.net

The Flint Rogues Rugby Football Club is a rugby union team from Flint, Michigan and member of USA Rugby, Division III Midwest Rugby Eastern Conference, Northern League and Division III of the Michigan Rugby Football Union.

== History ==
In March 1972, Larry Marfechuk and Jim Keener became the founding members of the Flint Rogues Rugby Football Club when they gathered a group of male athletes and taught them the game of rugby football. Back in 1972, the game was not as widespread in the State of Michigan as it is now and the Rogues were one of the first senior men's rugby teams in the state. The original uniform was red/white/blue in color but was replaced with the current colors of red/white/black.

In 1976, the Flint Rogues were a top contender in the State of Michigan. The club traveled to many tournaments out of state as far as Missouri and Louisiana. In 1980, the club brought home the B Division Championship for the Michigan Rugby Union in 1980 and also a Consolation Trophy for the B Division at the Great Lakes Rugby Tournament in Detroit. In 1984, the Flint Rogues won the Michigan Cup, First Division state title. In 1990, the Rogues won the Division II Michigan Cup, winning it again in 1992. In 1993, the Rogues won the Battle Creek 7's tournament and qualified for the Midwest 7's for the only time in club history.

The club experienced a good run from the late 1990s and into the early 2000s, being promoted to Division II of the Michigan Rugby Union. The club won the Division II Michigan Cup consecutively in 2002 and 2003. After a winless season in 2008, the Rogues rebounded, posting a 5-1 record in the 2009 spring season. The Rogues had a perfect fall 2010 season, going 7-0, winning Midwest Rugby's Northern League championship and earning a playoff berth for the first time in several seasons.

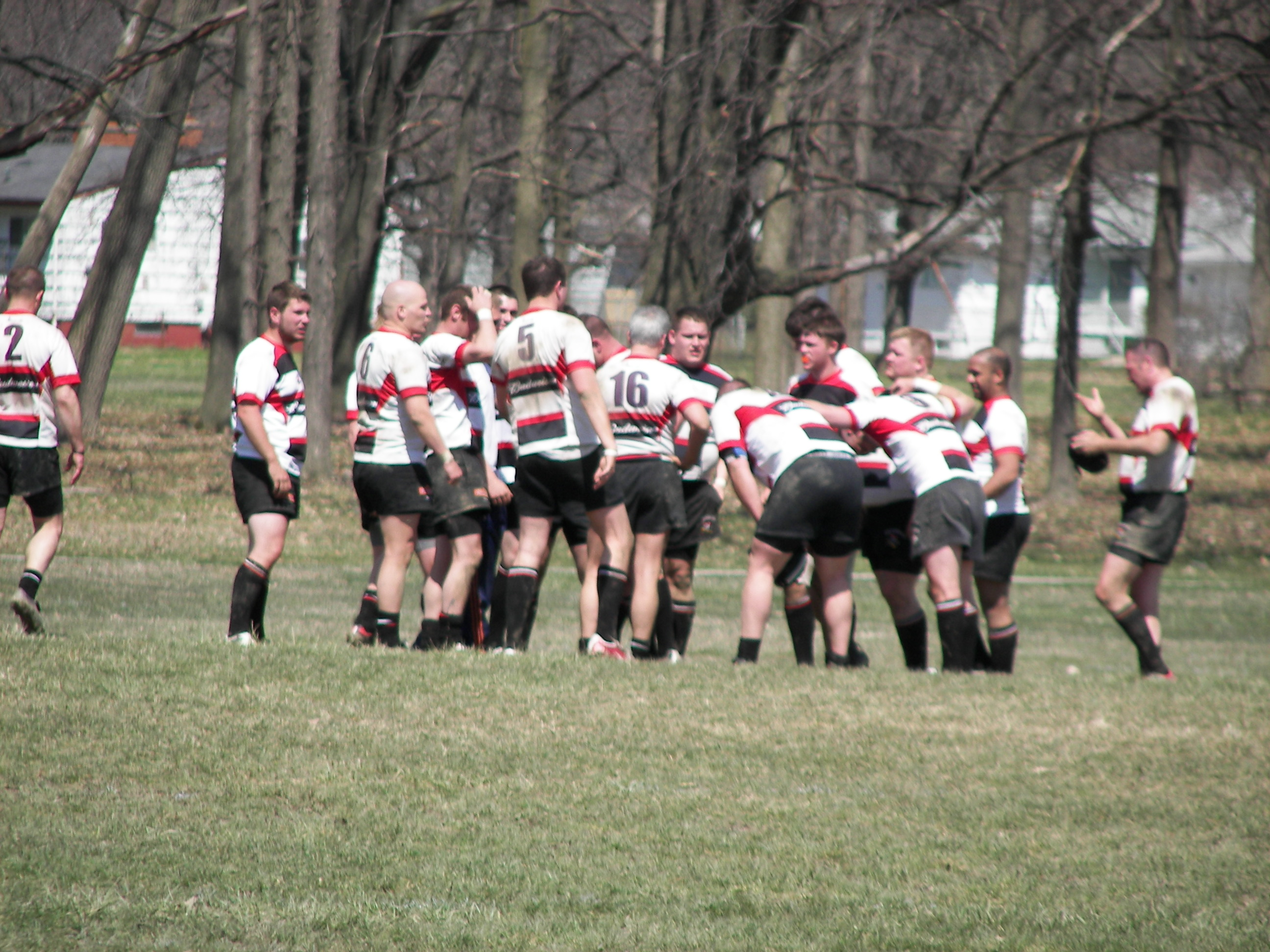
Battle of the Rogues: Flint Rogues RFC at halftime against Windsor Rogues RFC

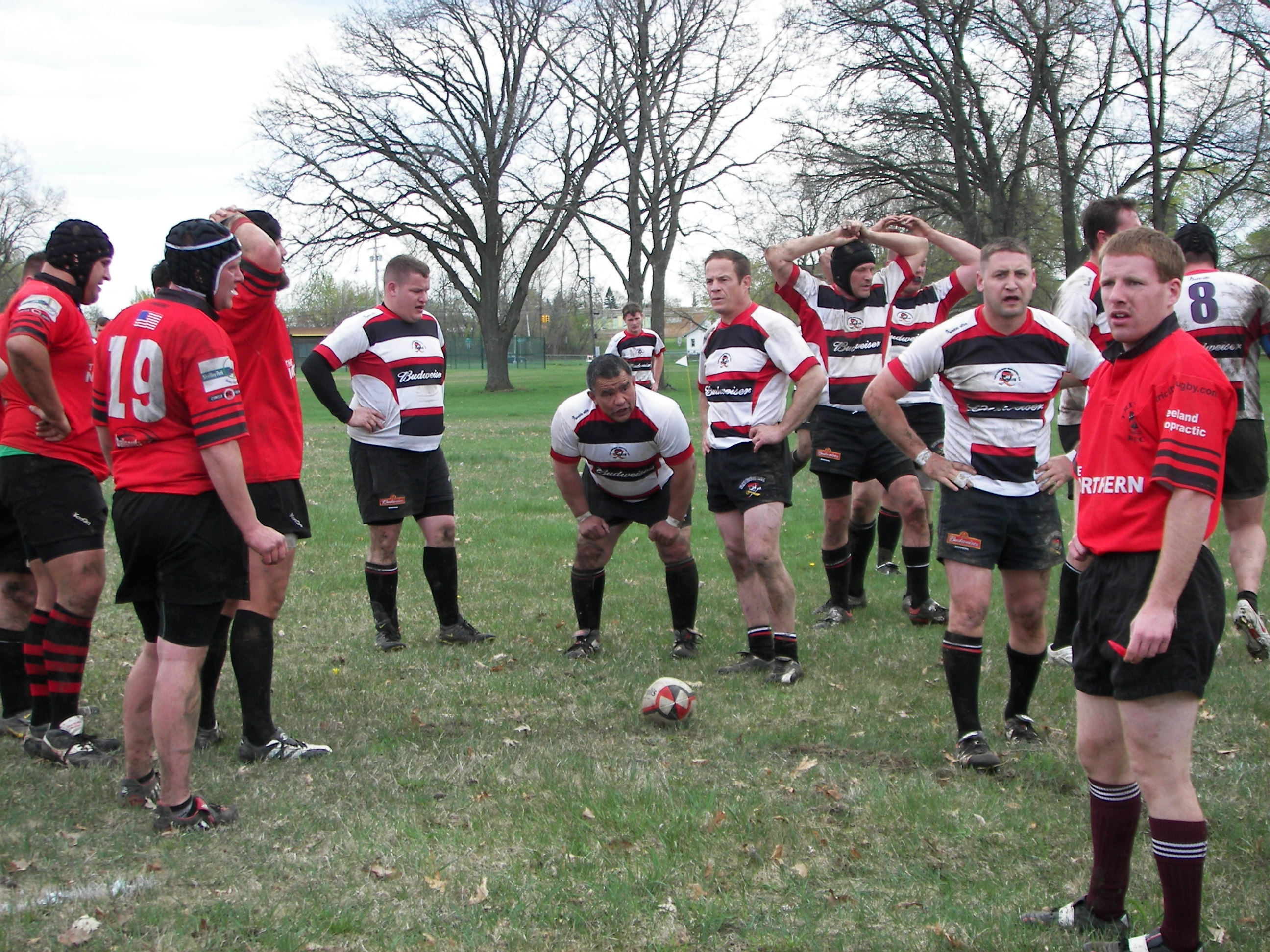
The Rogues gathering for a scrum against the Tri-City Barbarians RFC

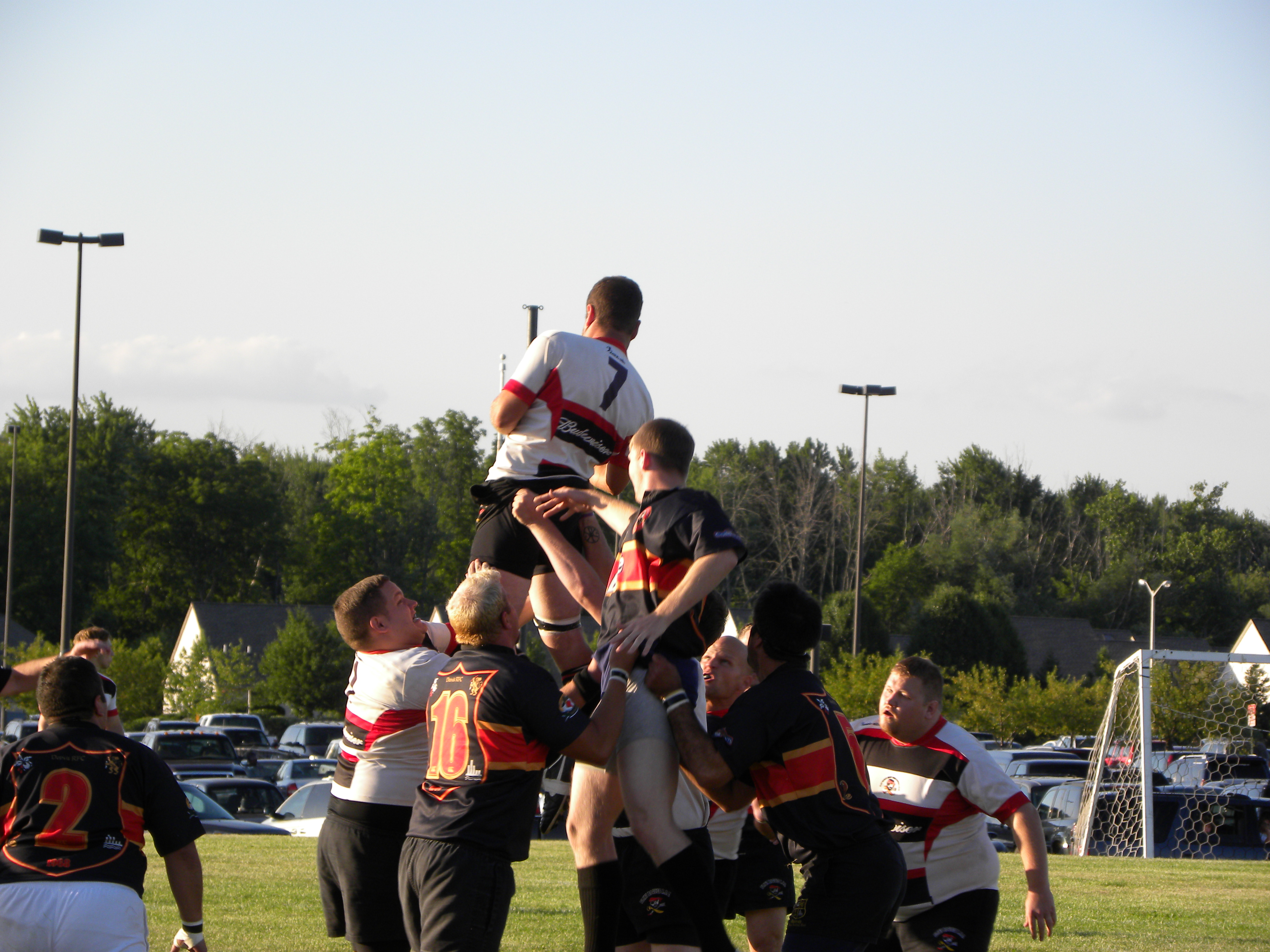
The Rogues securing a lineout against Detroit RFC

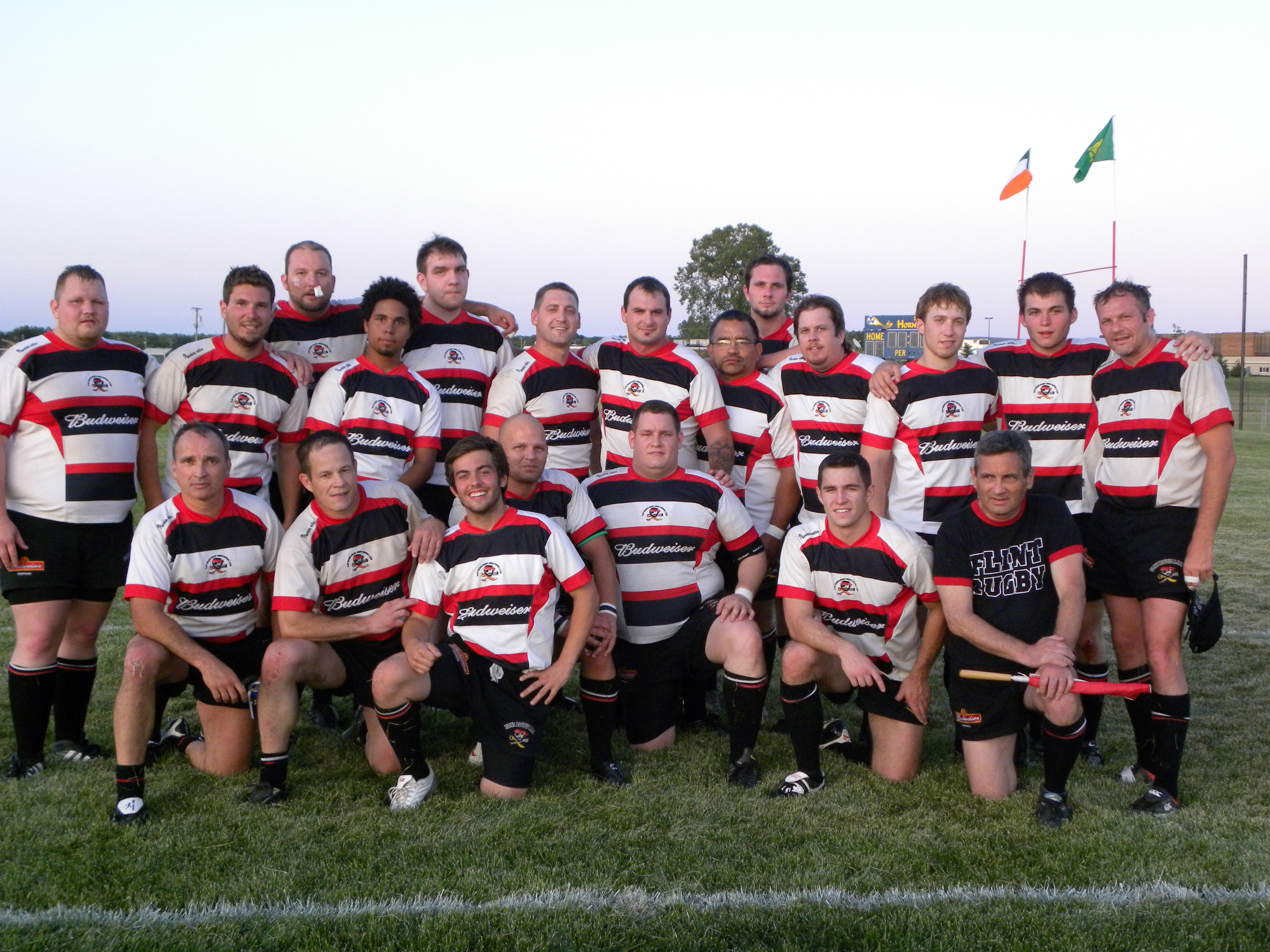
The Rogues after the annual game against Detroit RFC at the Saline Celtic Festival

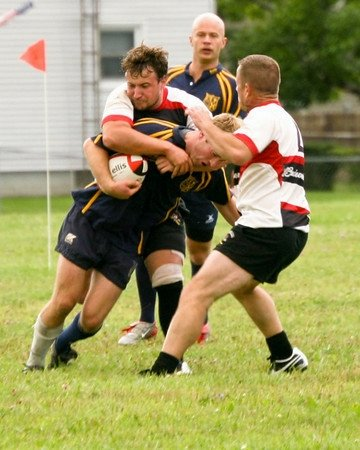
Paul "Cujo" Canjar laying the smackdown on a Michigan RFC player

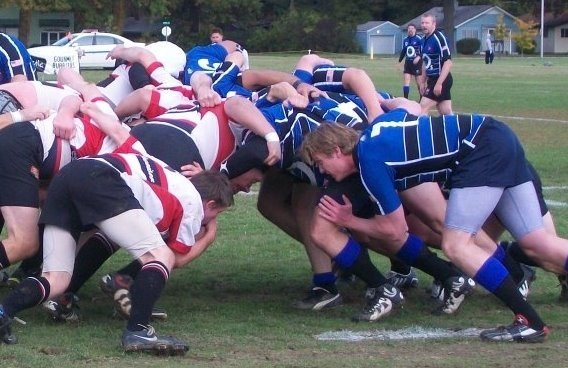
The Rogues in a scrum with Fort Wayne RFC

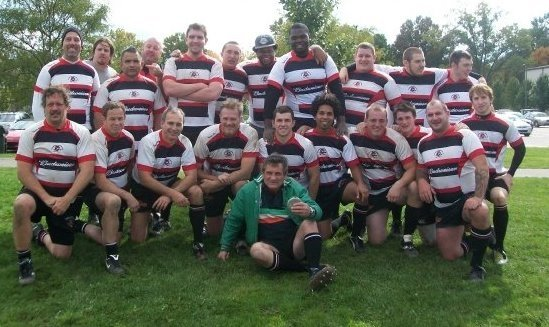
The Rogues after the 10 October 2009 game against Fort Wayne RFC

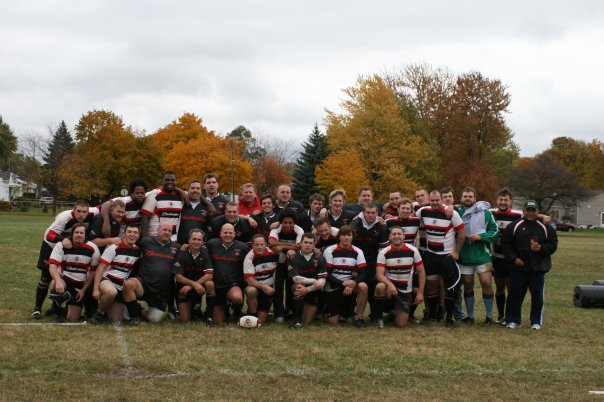
The Rogues team after the last game of the year against Traverse City

== Sponsorship ==
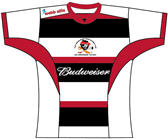
The Flint Rogues Current Uniform

After over a decade with Budweiser as their primary sponsor, the Rogues named Shea Automotive their primary sponsor prior to the Fall 2023 season; The Rogues also have several secondary sponsorships from many local businesses as well.

== Club Honors ==
- 1980 - Michigan Rugby Union B Division Championship
- 1980 - Consolation Trophy, B Division, Detroit Great Lakes Tournament
- 1984 - Division I Michigan Cup
- 1990, 1992, 2002, 2003 - Division II Michigan Cup
- 1993 - Battle Creek 7s Tournament Champions
- 1993 - Qualified for USA Rugby Midwest 7s Tournament
- 1997, 2000 - Kalamazoo Snowball Tournament Champions
- Rogues Cup (played for annually against the Windsor Rogues RFC) Winners - 2005, 2006, 2007, 2009, 2010, 2011
- Victory Cup (played for annually against the Tri-City Barbarians RFC) Winners - 2006, 2007, 2009, 2010, 2011
- 2010 - Midwest Rugby Union Northern League Champions
- 2022 — Midwest D-4 Runner-Up
- 2023 — Undefeated 5-0 Regular Season

== Our Opponents ==
Battle Creek Griffins RFC
Detroit RFC
Detroit Tradesmen RFC
Findlay SCARS RFC
Fort Wayne RFC
Grand Rapids Gazelles RFC
Kalamazoo Dogs RFC
Michiana Moose RFC
Michigan RFC
Oakland Highlanders RFC
Toledo Celtics RFC
Traverse City Blues RFC
Tri-City Barbarians RFC
Windsor Rogues RFC

== Game Results ==
2010 Season

Date	Home team	Score	Away team	Score	Venue	Match Report
April 10, 2010	Tri-City Barbarians	10	Flint Rogues RFC	5	Midland, MI	Loss
April 17, 2010	Windsor Rogues RFC	5	Flint Rogues RFC	40	Windsor, Ontario, Canada	Win
April 24, 2010	Flint Rogues RFC	24	Sarnia Saints RFC	28	Flint, MI	Loss
May 1, 2010	Detroit RFC	22	Flint Rogues RFC	27	Detroit, MI	Win
May 8, 2010	Flint Rogues RFC	31	Toledo Celtics RFC	20	Flint, MI	Win
May 15, 2010	Kalamazoo Dogs RFC	39	Flint Rogues RFC	29	Kalamazoo, MI	Loss
May 22, 2010	Flint Rogues RFC	56	Battle Creek Griffons RFC	19	Flint, MI	Win
August 26, 2010	Flint Rogues RFC	28	Detroit RFC	32	Flint, MI	Loss
September 11, 2010	Flint Rogues RFC	24	Kalamazoo Dogs RFC	5	Flint, MI	Win
September 18, 2010	Flint Rogues RFC	27	Battle Creek Griffins RFC	7	Flint, MI	Win
September 25, 2010	Traverse Bay Blues RFC	14	Flint Rogues RFC	71	Traverse City, MI	Win
October 2, 2010	Flint Rogues RFC	15	Fort Wayne RFC	8	Flint, MI	Win
October 9, 2010	Tri-City Barbarians RFC	5	Flint Rogues RFC	59	Midland, MI	Win
October 16, 2010	Michigan RFC	13	Flint Rogues RFC	49	Ann Arbor, MI	Win
October 23, 2010	Detroit Tradesmen RFC	17	Flint Rogues RFC	32	Warren, MI	Win
November 6, 2010	Cincinnati Kelts RFC	49	Flint Rogues RFC	28	Cincinnati, OH	Loss
