= Cincinnati Wolfhounds =

American rugby union team

Cincinnati
- Full name: Cincinnati Rugby Football Club
- Nickname: Wolfhounds
- Founded: 1974; 52 years ago
- Location: Cincinnati
- Ground: Brimelow Fields
- League: Midwest Rugby Premiership

Official website
- cincinnatirfc.com

The Cincinnati Rugby Football Club, nicknamed the Wolfhounds, is an American rugby union team based in Cincinnati, Ohio. The flagship team plays in the Midwest Rugby Premiership and additional teams playing in Division III and in the USA Rugby Club 7s for Men and Women.

== History ==
The club was founded in 1974. It currently fields competitive teams in Midwest's Division 1 and 3 and Club Sevens for both men's and women's. Since their inception, the Wolfhounds remain one of only two teams in the Midwest Rugby Union to compete in Division I for their entire history.
