= Milwaukee Barbarians =

- Full name: Milwaukee Barbarians Rugby
- Founded: 1975; 51 years ago
- Ground: Brown Deer Park
- President: Ty Ash
- League(s): USA Rugby Division 2 & 3
Team kit

Official website
- milwaukeerugby.org

The Milwaukee Barbarians are an American rugby team based in Milwaukee. The first team plays in Division 2 with an additional team playing in Division 3.

== History ==
The club was founded in 1975 as Derry's Rugby Club but rebranded as the Milwaukee Barbarians in 2012 after series of name changes including the Milwaukee Harlequins and the West Side Harlequins. Over the years, the club has made numerous appearances in the National Club Championship tournament in various divisions.

The full history of the club can be found here.

== Coaching staff ==
- Head coach: Joe Grams

== Notable players and affiliates ==
- Ben Landry : Represented the United States at the Rugby World Cup in 2019 and plays for the Seattle Seawolves in Major League Rugby.
- Daryl Bagley : Plays for the Dallas Jackals in Major League Rugby.
