= Columbus RFC (Ohio) =

American rugby union team

Columbus
- Full name: Columbus Rugby Football Club
- Union: USA Rugby
- Founded: 1975; 51 years ago
- Location: Columbus, Ohio
Team kit

Official website
- columbusrugby.org

Columbus RFC is an American rugby union team based in Columbus, Ohio. The flagship team plays in the Midwest Rugby Premiership with an additional team playing in Division II.

== History ==
The club was founded in 1975 as the Scioto Valley RFC.

== Notable former players ==
- (United States) Perry Baker
- (United States) Steve Finkel
- (United States) Jon Estep
- (United States) Andy McGarry
- (United States) Eric Parthmore
- (United States) Rich Schurfeld
- (United States) Gary Wilson
- (United States) Glynn Merrick
- (United States) Ron Keyser
- (United States) Terry Larimer
