= Carolinas Geographical Union =

Geographical Union for rugby union teams

Carolinas Geographical Rugby Union
- Abbreviation: CGRU
- Formation: 2013
- Region served: North Carolina; South Carolina, United States of America
- President: Scott Conway
- Website: cgru.rugby

The Carolinas Geographic Rugby Union is responsible for administration and governance of Rugby Union (XVs and 7s) for adults in North and South Carolina and surrounding areas in Tennessee and Georgia. The CGRU currently serves over 30 men's (D2/D3/D4) and women's (D2) clubs. Membership has grown significantly in recent years with over 1400 registered players. The mission of the Carolinas Geographic Rugby Union is to grow, develop, support, and manage the sport of rugby union in the Carolinas and surrounding areas.

== Men's Senior Clubs ==
· Asheville Iguanas Rugby Football Club

· Atlanta Old White

· Atlanta Renegade

· Cape Fear Rugby Football Club

· Charlotte Barbarians Rugby Football Club

· Charlotte Royals Rugby Football Club

· Charlotte Rugby Football Club CRFC Men's Team

· Columbia Rhinos RFC

· Fayetteville Dragons Rugby Club

· Gaston County Gargoyles Rugby Football Club

· Greenville Griffins RFC

· Hartsville RFC

· Johnson City RFC

· Life University

· Myrtle Beach RFC

· Onslow Misfits RFC

· Raeford RFC

· Southern Pines Celts Rugby Football Club

· Triad Rugby Football Club

· Tobacco Road RFC

== Women's Senior Clubs ==
· Atlanta 2.0 Selects

· Atlanta Harlequins

· Carolina Villains

· Charleston Hurricanes

· Charlotte Rugby Football Club CRFC Women's Team

· Columbia Bombshells

· Eno River Rugby Women's Rugby Football Club

· Fear the Maniacs RFC

· Savannah Shamrocks

· Southern Pines Celts

== See also ==
- Rugby union in the United States
