= Marcus Satavu =

US international rugby union footballer

- Born: Marcus Epi Satavu; November 22, 1988 (age 37) Portland, Oregon, United States
- Height: 1.88 m (6 ft 2 in)
- Weight: 100 kg (220 lb; 16 st)
- University: Southern Connecticut State University

Rugby union career
- Position(s): Outside centre, Wing
Amateur team(s)
Years	Team	Apps	(Points)
2007–2014	US Air Force		
2014	OMBAC Rugby		
2015	Hartford Wanderers		
2015–2016	Mystic River		
–	New Haven RFC		
Senior career
Years	Team	Apps	(Points)
2019-	Rugby United New York		
National sevens team
Years	Team		Comps
2012–2014	USA 7s		2
- Rugby league career

Playing information
- Position: Centre, Second-row
Club
Years	Team	Pld	T	G	FG	P
2016	Brooklyn Kings RLFC

Marcus Epi Satavu (born 22 November 1988) is an American rugby union player. He is of Fijian descent and has played senior level rugby with such teams as OMBAC, Mystic River and most recently, New Haven RFC. He has represented the United States playing rugby sevens, making his USA 7s debut at the Tokyo Sevens during the 2013–14 IRB Sevens World Series.

== Early life and career ==
Satavu was born in Oregon to Fijian parents but raised in Sunnyvale, California. He attended Fred C. Beyer High School in Modesto and graduated in 2007. Shortly after graduation, he joined the United States Air Force. As a child, Satavu spent several years in his parents native Sigatoka, Fiji, where he developed a passion for the sport of rugby. This passion, led to him earning a spot on the Air Force rugby team (also known as the Falcons) after trying out in 2011 while serving with the 337th Air Control Squadron at Tyndall Air Force Base in Florida. In his first year on the Falcons squad, Satavu helped his team to their 8th consecutive Armed Forces championship. Satavu's skill throughout the tournament did not go unnoticed, and earned him an honorable mention for the All-Tournament Team. In Later that year, Satavu was named to the United States Combined Services Rugby Team which played against a select side from New Zealand in Washington, D.C. In 2012, he was named to the Atlantis Sevens team, which acted as developmental side, representing the United States at the Victoria International 7s Tournament in British Columbia.

== USA Sevens and later club career ==
In January 2014, Satavu earned a spot in the Air Force World Class Athlete Program (WCAP) and an invitation to the USA Rugby developmental camp. He was one of five WCAP players to be named to the USA Eagles 7s residency squad in Chula Vista, California in preparation for the 2013–14 IRB Sevens World Series.

Satavu made his USA 7s debut against Fiji in the 2014 Japan Sevens that March, seeing playing in five of the USA's matches in that series, including USA's 12–17 loss to Australia in the plate final.. The following week he made his second tournament appearance with the Eagles in Hong Kong, garnering another 5 matches.

In June 2014, he was named to the OMBAC 7s roster, competing as San Diego in the Elite City 7s Series in Houston, helping his club reach the finals but losing to tournament favorites, Seattle. Satavu continued playing rugby after leaving the military and relocating to Connecticut. There he played for fifteens for local club Hartford and played in the high performance sevens circuit with the CT Bulldogs. In August 2014, Satavu was named to the Stars Rugby 7s invitational touring squad for the Tobago International Rugby 7s Tournament and would make several more appearances with the Stars over the next few years. Later that month he was again called upon by USA Rugby and was named to the developmental USA Falcons for the 2014 Serevi RugbyTown Sevens. In 2015, Satavu joined Mystic River sevens squad, helping them to a bronze medal at the 2015 USA Rugby Club 7s (USARC7).

== Rugby league career ==
Satavu also played rugby league with the Brooklyn Kings RLFC in the USARL during their 2016 season and was selected to represent the Northern Conference in the North vs. South All-Star Game that October. The following month, Satavu was given the opportunity to compete for a spot on the Rugby Football League's Toronto Wolfpack and made the final round of selections. That December, he traveled to United Kingdom as 1 of 10 Americans to join the team at training camp and compete for one of five roster spots. Later that month, Satavu started at Centre for the Toronto Wolfpack RLFC Trialists in a match against the Brighouse Rangers RFC but would not make the final selections.
