= Fijians in the United Kingdom =

Fijians in the United Kingdom include Fijian-born immigrants to the United Kingdom as well as their British-born descendants. As of 2011, there were 6,285 Fijian-born residents in the UK.

== History and settlement ==
Fiji and the United Kingdom have close ties, with Fiji being a member of the Commonwealth of Nations, although its membership was suspended in September 2009. For several generations, Fijians have served in the British Army. They fought for the British against the Japanese in the Second World War, and later in Malaya, Borneo, Oman and Iraq.

Fijians have been dubbed the "unsung heroes" of the British army, and, according to Major Charles Heyman, "There is a long military tradition in Fiji and many serve today because their fathers and grandfathers did" and "the Fijians have been an essential part of the British empire and what they are doing, basically, is filling the vacant slots in the British Army because we cannot recruit enough from the UK itself". As of 2009, approximately 2,000 Fijians are working for the British armed forces (as a result from recruiting since 1998).

== Demographics and population ==
The 2001 UK Census recorded 3,464 Fijian-born people residing in the United Kingdom. The 2011 census recorded 5,759 people born in Fiji living in England, 88 in Wales, 325 in Scotland and 113 in Northern Ireland.

The largest numbers of people of Fijian origin in the UK can be found in London as well as towns within the proximity of British Army infantry bases such as Catterick and Salisbury. Fiji is a diverse nation with a mix of many ethnicities, those of indigenous Austronesian origin form the majority of the island's population, with minorities of Indians amongst other groups. Many famous British people of Fijian descent are Indo-Fijians, including Nifa Hindes, Nishan Hindes, Satya Nandan, Ramon Tikaram, Tanita Tikaram and Simita Kumar.

== Culture and community ==
Many Fijians attend community church services held at various barracks around the country on the first Sunday of every month. The Fijian community in the UK is fairly tight-knit and they enjoy large banquets and meals together, where traditional Fijian dishes are cooked in earth ovens, Lovo is a popular with the community whilst other foods such as chicken, lamb, fish with coconut milk alongside yam and sweet potatoes are also popular. There are currently no Fijian shops or restaurants in the capital, although many African owned establishments prove popular with the Fijian community. Food is a major part of Fijian culture, and celebrations take place across the country every year on a day called Fiji day which commemorates the country's independence. Dancing and games of rugby are also a common sight at these celebrations. Fijians and other Pacific Islanders also tend to choose similar night clubs and venues especially in London.

== Notable individuals ==
- Nifa and Nishan Hindes
- Satya Nandan
- Ramon Tikaram
- Tanita Tikaram
- Derek Derenalagi
- Rus Tuima
- Joe Cokanasiga
- Phil Cokanasiga
- Simita Kumar

== See also ==
- Demographics of Fiji
- Fijians
