= Anthony Purpura =

American rugby union player

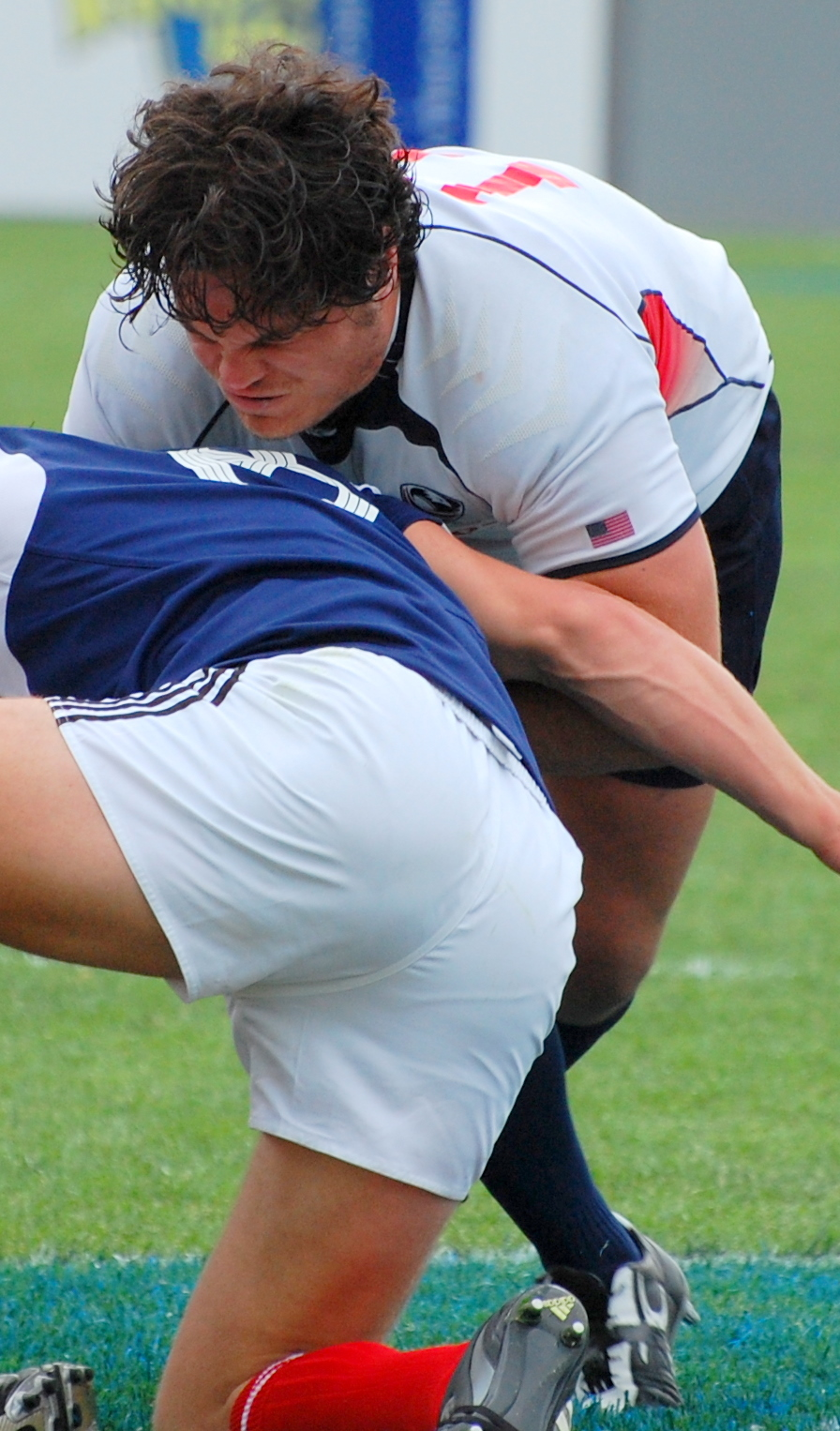
- Born: Anthony Purpura; November 11, 1986 (age 40) Lawrence, Massachusetts
- Height: 1.90 m (6 ft 3 in)
- Weight: 118 kg (260 lb; 18 st 8 lb)
- University: University of Maine

Rugby union career
- Position: Prop
- Current team: New England Free Jacks
Amateur team(s)
Years	Team	Apps	(Points)
2006–2007	Mystic River		
2007–2017	Boston R.C.		
2017	Old Blue		
Senior career
Years	Team	Apps	(Points)
2018	San Diego Legion	10	(0)
2019–	New England Free Jacks	2	(0)
International career
Years	Team	Apps	(Points)
2010-	USA	10	(5)
- Correct as of 6 July 2017

Anthony Purpura (born November 11, 1986, in Lawrence, Massachusetts) is a professional American rugby union player who plays prop for the USA Eagles XV side. He currently plays for the New England Free Jacks in Major League Rugby (MLR).

Purpura had a successful club career for top-level teams such as Old Blue R.F.C., Boston Rugby Club and Mystic River Rugby Club.

Other Club affiliations include University of Maine and Mid Canterbury Rugby Football Union and as assistant coach at Harvard University.

== Club rugby career ==
Purpura was introduced to the sport of rugby by a roommate while in school at Avon Old Farms, where he was a member of the football team and standout All-Star wrestler. In 2005 he entered the University of Maine as a recruit for the football team, but give it up the sport to join the U. Maine rugby club. Between 2005 and 2009 Purpura served as co captain and president of the club and helped the Black Bears to perhaps one of their best seasons, finishing the fall ranked 7th in the country. Throughout his four-year career at Maine, Purpura led the team to a 17–2–1 record.

While still in college, Purpura first transitioned to the next level of rugby with Division 1 Mystic River alongside former Eagle front rower Jake Sprague. In 2007 he made the jump to Boston RFC, then part of the Rugby Super League. After nearly a decade with Boston, Purpura had a short stint with Old Blue.

=== San Diego Legion ===
In March 2018, Purpura signed with the San Diego Legion of Major League Rugby.

=== New England Free Jacks ===
Purpura signed with the New England Free Jacks in 2019.

== USA Rugby career ==
Purpura was selected to tour with the USA Eagles squad for the Autumn 2010 tour of Europe and made his international debut in June 2010 was against Russia.

After a nearly seven-year hiatus, Purpura was again named to the Eagles roster as a starter against Uruguay on 4 February 2017. Two weeks later, he again earned a starting position in the front row and scored his first test match try in the USA's 51–34 victory y Canada on 18 February in Round 3 of the 2017 Americas Rugby Championship.
