= Pono =

Pono may refer to:

== People ==
- Pono (rapper) (born 1976), Polish rapper; see Polish hip hop
- Pono Haitsuka (born 1991), American rugby player
- Soyisile Pono (born 1994), South African cricket player
- Pono Chong (born 1970), Hawaiian politician

== Places ==
- Pono River, Indonesia

== Other ==
- Pono (digital music service)
- Pono (word)
- PonoPlayer
