= MRRC =

MRRC may refer to:

- Mangere Refugee Resettlement Centre, a refugee resettlement centre in New Zealand
- Metropolitan Remand and Reception Centre, a prison in Sydney, Australia
- Mystic River Rugby Club, a rugby club in Massachusetts, United States
