= United States national football team =

United States national football team may refer to:

== American football ==
- United States men's national American football team
- United States women's national American football team

== Association football (soccer) ==
- United States men's national soccer team
- United States women's national soccer team

== Australian rules football ==
- United States men's national Australian rules football team
- United States women's national Australian rules football team

== See also ==
- United States national rugby team (disambiguation)
- United States men's national football team (disambiguation)
- United States women's national football team (disambiguation)
