= Fijian Americans =

Ethnic group

Total population
- 54,383 (2020 census)

Regions with significant populations
- California (especially around Sacramento, followed by the San Francisco Bay Area as well as other places in the Central Valley and Los Angeles) and Texas; Smaller populations in New York City, Boston, Philadelphia, Chicago, Milwaukee, Washington, D.C., Atlanta, Miami, Saint Paul, Broomfield and Everett as well as Des Moines and Kansas City.

Languages
- American English, Fijian, Fiji Hindi

Religion
- Christianity, Hinduism, and Islam

Related ethnic groups
- Pacific Islanders, Indian Americans, Chinese Americans, Fijians

Fijian Americans refers to Americans citizens who are native to or descendants of people from the Fiji Islands. Most of Fijian Americans are of ethnic Fijians or Indo-Fijians descent. Fijian Americans are considered Pacific Islanders in the United States Census. There are 32,304 Fijian Americans living in the U.S. as of 2010, with 75% of them living in the state of California alone, especially in Sacramento County. The American Community Survey 2015-2019 counted a Fijian immigrant population of 47,000. In the 2020 census 54,006 people acclaimed to be of "Fijian" descent while another 377 acclaimed to be of Rotuman descent.

== History ==
Fijians began to migrate in small numbers to the United States in the early 1950s. It was not until 1959 that Fijians began to emigrate in large numbers, emigrating 71 Fijians to the US in this year. In the 1960s more of 400 Fijians emigrated to the United States (mostly in 1968, when emigrated 368 Fijians). Since then the number of Fijian immigrants admitted to the United States has ranged from hundreds to a few thousand people each year.

During the 1970s and 1980s, the number of Fijians emigrating legally to the United States rose significantly. In the 1970s, the number increased between 1976 and 1979, rising from 132 to about 1,000 people. In the 1980s, the number rose from 712 people in 1983 to more than 1,200 people in 1987.

Later, in 1996, 1,847 more Fijians arrived in the US and, in 1997, 1,549 Fijians arrived with legal status.

== Demographics ==
There are 32,304 Fijian Americans in the United States according to the 2010 US Census. California has the largest population of people of Fijian nationality, enumerating 19,355 residents (0.06% of the state's population). The largest Fijian communities are in Sacramento County, Sonoma County, and Alameda County. There is a sizable community of Fijian Americans in Modesto (0.6%; 1,109 residents). These communities may include Indo-Fijians. According to the 2015-2019 American Community Survey, there were 47K Fijian immigrants in the USA, the top counties of residence being:

1) Sacramento County, California - 11,000

2) Alameda County, California - 5,100

3) San Mateo County, California - 3,400

4) Stanislaus County, California - 3,000

5) Los Angeles County, California - 2,500

6) San Joaquin County, California - 1,900

7) Contra Costa County, California - 1,600

8) Snohomish County, Washington - 1,300

9) Santa Clara County, California - 1,300

10) Sonoma County, California - 1,000

Fijian Americans have several associations, including the Fiji American National Association, FANA in Hayward, California, and the Fiji American Welfare Association.

== Notable people ==
- Freddie Keiaho
- Roger Keiaho, of Rey Fresco
- Jimmy Snuka
- Jimmy Snuka, Jr. ("Deuce")
- Tamina Snuka
- Hodgy
- Vijay Singh
- Prerna Lal
- Frankie Luvu
- Dinah Jane
- Chris Aguila
- Andrew Osborne
- Saul Patu
- Marcus Satavu
- Preeya Singh
- Inoke Breckterfield
- Mekeli Wesley
- Tai Wesley
- Bui Baravilala
- Hosanna Kabakoro
- Jovesa Naivalu
- David Niu
- Trina Davis
- Alpana Singh
- Bobby Singh
- Ronil Singh
- Joshua Fox
- Ciwa Griffiths
- Saimoni Tamani
- David Young
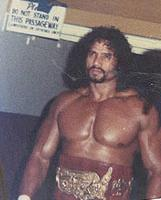
Jimmy Snuka

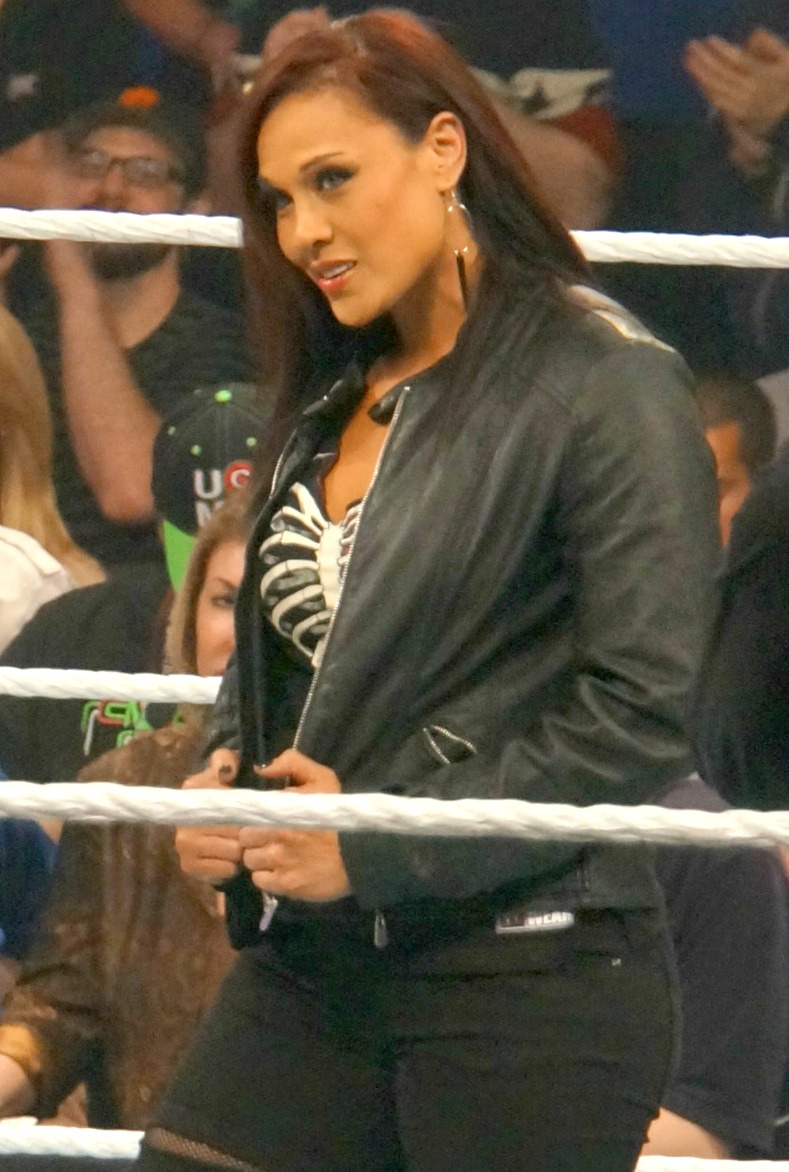
Tamina Snuka

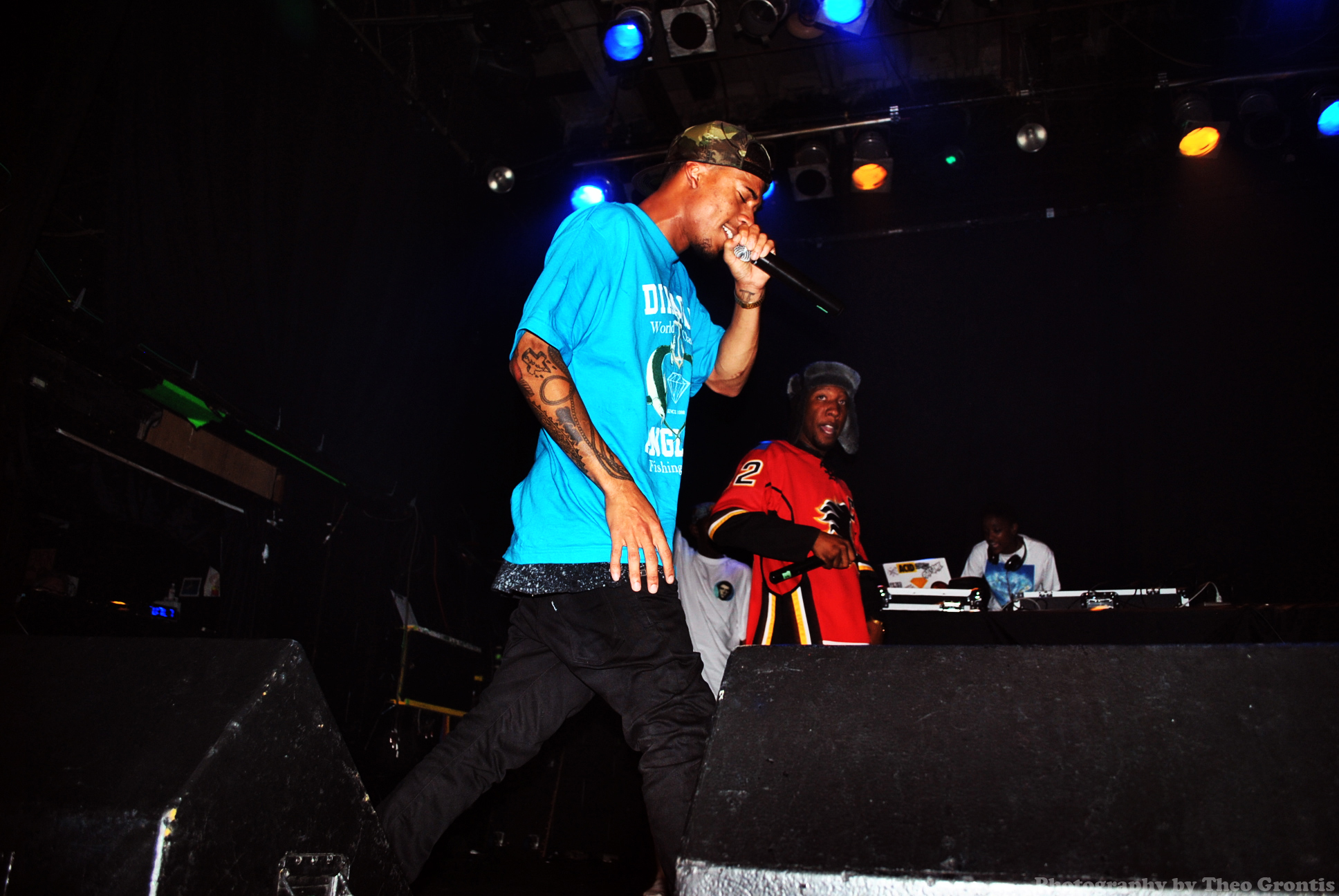
Hodgy

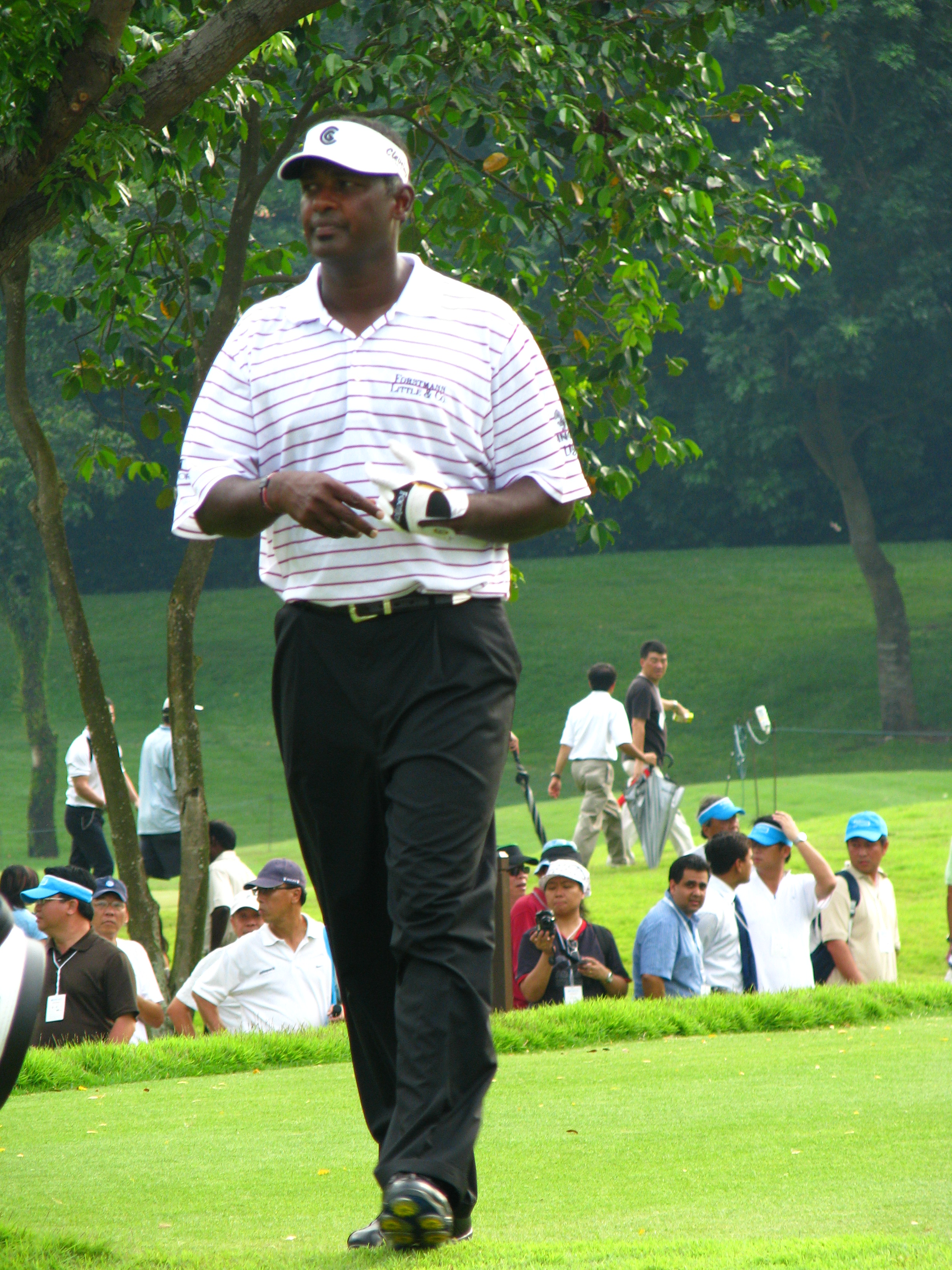
Vijay Singh
