= Alatasi Tupou =

Samoa international rugby union player

- Born: Alatasi Tupou; April 21, 1988 (age 38) Apia, Samoa
- Height: 1.89 m (6 ft 2 in)
- Weight: 87 kg (192 lb)

Rugby union career
- Position: scrum half
Senior career
Years	Team	Apps	(Points)
2014	Shirley RFC		
2015–2016	Mystic River	18	(249)
International career
Years	Team	Apps	(Points)
2008	Samoa U20		
2008–2014	Samoa		
National sevens team
Years	Team		Comps
2006–	Samoa 7s		59

Alatasi Tupou (born April 21, 1988) is a Samoan professional rugby union player from Apia, Samoa. He has represented Samoa in both rugby fifteens and sevens and was also a member of Mystic River's the 2016 National Championship squad in the American Rugby Premiership.

== Rugby career ==
=== Fifteens ===
Tupou first represented Samoa with the Samoan U20 team in 2008. He was quickly called up to the senior national fifteen a side team that same year, making his debut as the starting full-back against the New Zealand All Blacks on September 3, 2008, becoming the first junior player to graduate from playing in the IRB Junior World Championship to win full Test honors. The following year he was named as a replacement scrum half for Samoa's Rugby World Cup Qualifier match against Papua New Guinea.

=== Sevens ===
Tupou has been a regular on the Samoan Sevens roster since he was eighteen years old and has been active in the World Rugby Sevens Series, scoring 467 points in nearly 200 matches throughout his 48 tournament appearances between 2006 and 2015. In 2012, Tupou made headlines during the 2012 Wellington Sevens after he was tackled by an inebriated spectator who rushed onto the field during Samoa's final match of pool play against New Zealand.

In November 2016, Tupou was named to the Manu Samoan team to compete in the Dubai and South African legs of the 2016–17 World Rugby Sevens Series. The following year he was named to captain for Samoa's 2017/2018 rugby sevens season which began in July at the 2017 Dubai Sevens, leading his team to a 6th-place finish. He continued with the Samoan squad for 7 more tournaments before serving a brief suspension due to a drunk driving incident prior to the London leg of the tour. After pleading guilty to driving under the influence and without a licence, Tupou was given a two-week suspension (not including his stand down from the London and Paris legs). Upon completion of his suspension Tupou would be named to the Samoan squad which competed in the 2018 Rugby World Cup Sevens in San Francisco, marking his first appearance since April.

=== Club career ===
In 2014, Tupou played for the Shirley Rugby Club in Christchurch, New Zealand. He later signed with the Mystic River Rugby Club in Boston, Massachusetts in 2015, helping them win a bronze medal in the USA Rugby Club 7s Championship Series. Tupou stayed with the Mystics for their 2015-2016 fifteen a side campaign in the American Rugby Premiership, helping them to a national title. Tupou scored 17 points (1 try, 2 penalties, 3 conversions) in the final match of the USA Rugby Emirates Airline Club Men's Division I National Championship, earning Most Valuable Player honors.
