= Derek Derenalagi =

British Paralympic athlete (born 1974)

Personal information
- Nationality: Fijian/British
- Born: 3 October 1974 (age 52) Nadi, Fiji

Sport
- Country: Great Britain
- Sport: Athletics
- Events: F57 Shot put F57 Discus
- Club: Watford
- Coached by: Alison O'Riordan

Achievements and titles
- Paralympic finals: 2012
- Personal bests: Shot Put: 11.55m Discus: 43.03m
Medal record
Track and field (athletics)
Representing Great Britain
IPC Athletics European Championships
Gold medal – first place	2012 Stadskanaal	discus - F57/58

Derek Derenalagi (born 3 October 1974) is a British Paralympic discus thrower and former soldier.

== Early life ==
From Nakavu Village in Nadi, Fiji, Derenalagi was born to a single mother and was raised by his grandmother.

== Military service ==
Derek Derenalagi
- Military career
- Allegiance: United Kingdom
- Branch: British Army
- Service years: 1999–2007
- Rank: Private

Derenalagi joined the British Army in 1999. As Fiji was part of the British Empire from ~1870-1970, there is a well-established tradition of Fijians joining the British armed forces. For example, thousands of Fijians served as part of New Zealand and Australian units during WW2. In July 2007 he was on a tour of duty in Helmand Province, Afghanistan, when his vehicle was hit by an improvised explosive device (IED) as it travelled to a helicopter landing site. On return to Camp Bastion he was pronounced dead, but whilst preparing his body for a body bag, medical staff found that he still had a pulse. As a result of the injuries he sustained, both of Derenalagi's legs were amputated above the knee. In a coma, he was flown back to the UK where, nine days later, he woke up in Selly Oak Hospital, Birmingham.

== Athletics ==
Derenalagi is part of the Ministry of Defence's Battle Back programme, funded by the Help for Heroes charity. As part of the scheme he took part in a 2009 training camp at the United States Olympic Training Center at Chula Vista, California. He competes in the F57 Paralympic disability category for athletes with spinal cord injuries and amputations. At the 2012 IPC Athletics European Championships in the Netherlands, Derenalagi won the gold medal in the F57/58 discus. His winning throw of 41.41 metres (135.9 ft) came in the final round of the competition and earned him a score of 826 points, enough to beat Russian F58 world champion and world record holder Alexey Ashapatov, whose throw of 46.85 metres (153.7 ft) scored him 795 points.

Derenalagi was selected to represent Great Britain at the 2012 Summer Paralympics as part of a 49-member squad for athletics. He competed in the men's F57–58 discus event, which was held on 31 August 2012 in the Olympic Stadium. He is the first Fijian selected to represent Great Britain in the Paralympics.

== Speaking ==
Derenalagi is an inspirational speaker and regularly speaks at schools, charity events, and businesses across the UK to talk about overcoming adversity, and achieving goals. He is represented by the speaking agency Military Speakers
