= United States men's national football team =

The United States men's national football team may refer to:

- United States men's national American football team, men's national American football team
- United States men's national Australian rules football team, men's national Australian rules football team
- United States men's national soccer team, men's national association football team

== See also ==
- United States women's national football team (disambiguation)
- United States national football team (disambiguation)
