= Richard Tardits =

United States international rugby union & gridiron football player

- Born: Richard Tardits; July 30, 1965 (age 61) Bayonne, France
- Height: 1.87 m (6 ft 2 in)
- Weight: 110 kg (240 lb)

Rugby union career
- Position: Flanker
Senior career
Years	Team	Apps	(Points)
- Mystic River Rugby Club
International career
Years	Team	Apps	(Points)
1993–1999	United States	24	(10)
- Football career

Profile
- Position: Linebacker

Career information
- College: Georgia
- NFL draft: 1989: 5th round, 123 (By the Phoenix Cardinals)th overall pick

Career history
- 1989: Phoenix Cardinals*
- 1990–1992: New England Patriots
- * Offseason or practice squad member only
- Stats at Pro Football Reference

Richard Tardits (born July 30, 1965), is a former American football linebacker for the New England Patriots of the National Football League (NFL), and a former rugby union footballer for the United States national rugby union team. He held the record for most sacks in a career at the University of Georgia, until surpassed by David Pollack in 2004, and he was referred to as 'Le Sack' by fans because of his French birth.

== Playing career ==
Tardits was born in Bayonne, France. He was former player on the French junior national rugby team and a participant in the Running of the Bulls at Pamplona, he was a walk-on for the Georgia Bulldogs. During his NFL playing days, he sponsored a semipro football team in his French hometown of Biarritz.

During his NFL career, he also helped the Mystic River Rugby Club reach the national finals. He later represented the United States in rugby.

== NFL career ==
Phoenix Cardinals

- 1989: 5th round Draft pick (123rd overall)

New England Patriots

- 1990: 2 G, 1 GS
- 1991: 16 G, 1FR
- 1992: 9 G

Career Totals: 27 Games, 1 Game Start, 1 Fumble Recovery

== Rugby Career (USA Eagles) ==
Rugby World Cup

- 1999 (1 +1 Game)

Rugby World Cup Qualifiers

- 1994–1996 (3 Games, 1 Try)

Pacific Rim Championship

- 1996–1997 (3 Games)
- 1997–1998 (1 Game)
- 1998–1999 (5 Games)

Pan-American Championship

- 1996–1997 (1 Game)

Friendlies

- 02/10/1993 v Australia
- 12/03/1994 v Bermuda (1 Try)
- 21/05/1994 v Canada
- 05/11/1994 v Ireland
- 06/01/1996 v Ireland (1 Try)
- 11/01/1997 v Wales
- 12/04/1998 v Spain (Sub)
- 25/07/1998 v Fiji (Sub)

Other Club Affiliations:

- French National Team (under 21)
- Biarritz Olympique (France)
- Mystic River Rugby Club (USA)
