= Jennie Scott Griffiths =

American journalist and activist (1875–1951)

- Griffiths, Brisbane, 1920
- Born: Jennie Scott Wilson; October 30, 1875; Woodville, Texas, U.S.
- Died: June 29, 1951 (aged 75); San Francisco, California, U.S.
- Citizenship: United States (until 1897); United Kingdom (1897–1928); United States (from 1928)
- Occupations: Journalist, activist
- Years active: 1893–1951
- Employers: Fiji Times; Australian Woman's Weekly; freelance writer
- Known for: Feminist, labor, and socialist organizing; pacifism
- Children: 10, including Ciwa
- Relatives: George Littleton Griffiths (father-in-law)

Jennie Scott Griffiths (October 30, 1875 – June 29, 1951) was an American newspaper editor, journalist, and political and women's rights activist. Born in Texas, from the age of two, she performed as an orator and was a well-known elocutionist and child prodigy. Mostly homeschooled, she did attend formal institutions briefly and learned shorthand and typing. Her first job was typing the History of Texas from 1685 to 1892. Then she worked as a journalist and as a promoter for the Hagey Institute, which led to her traveling abroad. While on a world tour to promote the institute, she went to Fiji and married. Griffiths began editing for the Fiji Times, a newspaper owned by her husband. In 1913, the family moved to Australia where she became active in feminist, labor, and socialist organizations. As a pacifist, she opposed drafting personnel for war service. She wrote regularly for The Australian Worker and the socialist press. In the 1920s her family moved to San Francisco and naturalized as American citizens. She worked on the Federal Writers' Project of the Works Progress Administration and continued publishing in journals like the Industrial Worker. She served as the secretary of the California branch of the National Woman's Party in the 1940s and lectured frequently in favor of the passage of the Equal Rights Amendment. Her papers are housed in the National Library of Australia.

== Early life and education ==
Jennie Scott Wilson was born on October 30, 1875, near Woodville, in a log cabin built by her father on the banks of Wolf Creek in Tyler County, Texas, to Laura (Cowart née Nettles) and Stephen Randolph Wilson. Her mother was from Louisiana, and her father, known as Randolph, was a cotton farmer from Tennessee. He had served in Hood's Texan Brigade of the Confederate Army during the American Civil War and her mother had lost all of her brothers in the conflict. (Note: Laura had previously been married to William J. Cowart and had four children with him: Thomas (b. 1860), John (b. 1862), William (b. 1864), and James (b. 1866). Randolph had previously been married to Rachael A Charlton with whom he had three children: Mary (b. 1854), J.C. (b. 1856), and Sarah (b. 1864).) After their marriage, the couple would have two daughters together, R. Ellen (b. 1874) and Jennie, who was named after a family friend.

Wilson was the youngest child, very small for her age weighing only 14 pounds (6.4 kg) at nearly age three (as an adult she stood 4 feet 9 inches (145 cm)), and was considered a child prodigy in elocution. She began to deliver speeches when she was just two years old and went on to cover subjects such as temperance and spirituality when addressing veterans groups and Sunday schools. The orations were written by her father, or included well known works, such as Rose Hartwick Thorpe's Curfew Must Not Ring Tonight and Edgar Allan Poe's The Raven and were presented throughout the state. She also recited prose and poetry, for which newspapers reported about her remarkable memorization skills. At the end of her performances she collected offerings from the audience. The family moved to Limestone County, Texas, when she was young, first settling in Pottersville and later in Lost Prairie.

When Wilson was twelve, the family moved again, settling in Huntsville, Texas. She enrolled in school for the first time there, but quickly rose to the top of the class and left, continuing her education with a tutor at home, studying the works of Edward Bellamy, Charles Darwin, Henry George, Thomas Huxley, and Thomas Paine. The family moved again in 1890 to Austin, and Wilson began learning shorthand and typing at a local business school. (Note: Wilson later claimed that she enrolled in law school in 1890, at the University of Texas at Austin, but left before graduating because women were not allowed to practice law. The university credits Ella Crim Lynch as the first woman to enroll in 1906, in their law school and the Texas District and County Attorneys Association confirms that women could not be licensed until 1913. A 1909 newspaper story about Griffiths published in The Panola Watchman indicates only that she attended business school in Austin when she was sixteen. Law school records for the University of Texas do not show Wilson as a student, but do show her half-brother Thomas Cowart as a student in 1892. T. H. Irving, who wrote the entry on Griffiths for the Australian Dictionary of Biography, speculated that she might have learned law from her brother.) She did not finish the course, as she received a job offer to type John Henry Brown's History of Texas from 1685 to 1892. In 1893, she moved to San Antonio and began writing for and editing the youth column of the journal Texas Farmer. Simultaneously, she also began working as a court reporter and became involved in the work of the Hagey Institute, an organization which promised to cure alcoholism and narcotic addiction. Her main income came from her promotional work with Hagey, frequently traveling from Texas to California, Colorado, and Mexico over the next three years on their behalf.

== Career ==
=== Fiji (1896–1912) ===
In 1896, Wilson left Texas with her half-brother Thomas Cowart and his family to promote the establishment of Hagey Institutes internationally. After stopping in Honolulu, Hawaii, the group made their way to Auckland, New Zealand, before arriving in Suva, Fiji. Upon her arrival, she met Arthur George Griffiths, oldest son of the editor of the Fiji Times newspaper. Arthur proposed to her upon their meeting and despite her brother's protests, the two were married the following day, November 9, 1897, at the Holy Trinity Anglican Cathedral, in Suva. Under the nationality laws in place at the time, United States nationals who were women, lost their nationality upon marriage, as it was assumed that they acquired the nationality of their husband. Because of the legislation, Wilson lost her United States' citizenship. Fiji, at the time was a British colony and under the Fijian nationality law, Europeans living in Fiji were British subjects. Under terms of the British Aliens Act 1844, foreign women marrying British husbands became British subjects. The couple would have ten children together: Randolph (1898), Tom (1900), Don (1901), Max (1902), Laura (1903), Leonard (1905), Stephen (1907), Leonie (1908), Ciwa (1911), and Hazel (1913).

Despite her duties as a mother, Griffiths became a contributor and editor at the Fiji Times, out of financial necessity. The couple engaged a nanny to help with the children and both Arthur and she worked as unpaid help to keep the paper going. When Jennie's father-in-law George Littleton Griffiths died in 1908, Arthur inherited the businesses. He had little training in writing, as he had focused on the management side of the business and keeping the equipment running. As Griffiths' experience was in writing, she took over editing the paper and wrote a regular column "Passing Notes", a society page, as well as reporting on the news, including coverage of foreign events and the legislature. Arthur was not suited to running the business and because of a lack of schooling opportunities, Griffiths urged him to sell it so that they could relocate to Australia in 1912.

=== Australia (1913–1920) ===
Arthur invested the proceeds from the sale in a large house in Sydney and the B & R Motor Company. The business went bankrupt, causing them to have to move. As the children reached the age of fourteen, each had to go to work to help with the family finances. Three months after having given birth to her last child in 1913, Griffiths went to work at Australian Woman's Weekly, a women's journal which was operated by Denton & Spencer from 1911 to 1921 before folding. (Note: Per Clarke, the Australian Woman's Weekly published by Denton & Spencer had no affiliation with the current magazine The Australian Women's Weekly which was founded in 1931.) The paper focused on household hints, fashion, handicrafts, and short fiction pieces. Under her editorship, Griffiths began to add articles on professional women and employment issues, as well as political and social movements. Eventually, she added more radical commentary in an opinion column which covered issues such as cooperative child care centers and kitchens to help the poor, the plight of unemployed women immigrants, equal pay, child welfare programs, legal reforms of divorce laws, women's participation in politics, sexual hygiene and birth control.

By 1915, Griffiths was publishing articles in other journals and newspapers like The Australian Worker, Sydney's The International Socialist and The Sunday Times, which allowed her to express her pacifist and socialist views. By 1916, she was publishing more articles on feminism and politics in other journals than she was writing for Australian Woman's Weekly. In the debates on the draft, which emerged in women's groups in 1916 and 1917 after Australia entered into World War I, she argued strongly against the policy. She joined organizations like the Australian Labor Party, Social Democratic League, the Women's Anti-Conscription Committee, and the Women's Peace Army and actively took an anti-war stance. She participated in peace demonstrations, petition drives, and used her skill from her youth as an elocution performer to speak perched upon boxes in the street proclaiming the evils of war and its ties to power and wealth for those who benefited from the profits of increased manufacturing of weapons and other war-related products. These activities led the publishers of the Australian Woman's Weekly to fire her in October 1916.

After her termination, Griffiths was unable to find permanent employment and took assignments to write articles for numerous papers both in and out of Australia. In addition to publishing in the Sunday Times, the International Socialist and Brisbane's Daily Standard, she wrote articles on feminism and against the war for Britain's Social Democrat and Chicago's Industrial Worker. She also wrote articles criticizing racism and the prosecution of people who opposed the war. Federal policies in favor of the war, the uncertain employment of both herself and Arthur, and the fact that T. J. Ryan, Premier of Queensland, was the only remaining Labor Party leader in power, convinced Griffiths to move to Queensland in 1917, where the family settled in Brisbane. She became very active there, speaking at meetings in support of the Bolshevik revolution, International Workers' Day, and the Sydney Twelve, members of the Industrial Workers of the World who had been arrested and charged with treason. She attempted to revive the Queensland Socialist League and was involved in the Red Flag riots, both in sewing banners and participating in demonstrations. When participants in the March 1919 protest were arrested, she campaigned for their release, but was disillusioned by the Australian turn toward conservatism and decided after the prisoner release to return to the United States.

=== United States (1920–1951) ===
In June 1920, Griffiths returned to Texas, first settling in San Benito in Cameron County. Family members followed a few at a time over several months, with some of the boys taking positions as crew on sailing vessels to pay for their passage. Two of her sons, Randolph and Don, remained behind in Australia. In 1922, they were back in San Antonio, and Griffiths was campaigning for the pardon of George McKinley Grace, a Black man who had been found guilty of assaulting a White woman. Griffiths and his other supporters opposed his hanging, believing that he was wrongfully convicted, but they were unsuccessful. Unable to make a living there, by 1923 the family had moved to San Francisco, California. She became a regular contributor of poetry to the Industrial Worker and wrote for the San Francisco Examiner and other local newspapers. She was involved in speaking engagements and activities of the Children's Protection Society, the Women's International League for Peace and Freedom, the Women's Peace Union, and the National Woman's Party. In 1928, she regained her United States nationality, when she and Arthur naturalized.

During the 1930s Griffiths was recognized in the book American Women Poets of 1937 published by Henry Harrison in 1937 and was involved in the California division of the Federal Writers' Project for the Works Progress Administration. She gave lectures and worked for passage of the Equal Rights Amendment in the 1940s and in 1943 was elected as secretary-treasurer of the California branch of the National Woman's Party. Griffiths was one of the featured lecturers on women's gains toward equality for the National Woman's Party's commemoration of Susan B. Anthony's 125th birthday in 1945. In 1947, she was one of the women honored by the National Woman's Party for their work to gain suffrage and advance women's rights and in 1949, she was the California delegate to the party convention.

== Death and legacy ==
Griffiths died on June 29, 1951, in San Francisco and was buried on July 2 at the Woodlawn Memorial Park Cemetery in Colma, California. Her papers were donated to the National Library of Australia in 1993. The leather bag which was presented to her by the Red Flag prisoners, for whose release she had pressed, is also part of the collection of her memorabilia at the National Library. Griffiths is remembered as an activist who championed equal opportunity and equal rights for women, in part because she was often the main breadwinner in her family and in part because of her beliefs and idealism to defend those she felt had been wronged by social conventions and injustice. Her daughter, Ciwa, became a pioneering speech therapist who founded the HEAR Center in California and spent her career advocating for the use of technology and speech education to help people with hearing difficulties.
