= United States women's national football team =

United States women's national football team may refer to:

- United States women's national American football team
- United States women's national Australian rules football team
- United States women's national soccer team

== See also ==
- United States men's national football team (disambiguation)
- United States national football team (disambiguation)
