= Mystic River Rugby Club =

US rugby union club, based in Malden, MA

Mystic River Rugby
- Full name: Mystic River Rugby Club (MRRC)
- Union: USA Rugby
- Founded: 1974; 52 years ago
- Ground: Pine Banks Park (Capacity: 1,000)
- Coach(es): (New Zealand) Kayne Bubb (United States) Thomas Clark (United States) Kareem Affifi (United States) Mike Bozza (United States) Alex Brussard
- League(s): American Rugby Premiership; NERFU Division 1 NERFU Division 2
1st kit	2nd kit

Official website
- www.mysticrugby.com

The Mystic River Rugby Club, sometimes called Boston Mystic, is a New England Rugby Football Union (NERFU) club, founded in 1974, located in Malden, Massachusetts, and Melrose, Massachusetts, who field teams in Division 1 American Rugby Premiership and Division 2 Rugby Union in the United States and are the current 2018 USA Rugby D1 National Champions.

Their home field is located at Pine Banks Park. Their primary sponsor is Coors Light.

== History ==
=== The early years (1970s) ===
The Mystic River Rugby Club was founded in 1974 by 32 members of the Boston Rugby Club, who took a great step forward in exercising their independence. These members had long since functioned as a ‘club within a club’ and had developed a distinct style of play both on and off the field. They were experienced rugby players, and immediately the Mystics established a schedule within the first division of New England. They soon became a sought-after fixture by teams from all over based on a reputation for hard, fast rugby and an aggressive “joie de vie”.

The club evolved throughout the 1970s with the influx of younger players and Tours to Wales and the former Soviet Union highlighted these years. In 1978, the Mystics became the first American rugby team to be invited to play rugby in the Soviet Union. In the early 1980s the club saw a major turnover, a somewhat generational change, when several new players were attracted from local colleges. Old Boys rugby began to take shape and several of the original Mystics began playing a schedule of "over 30s" rugby. In 1986 the Mystics returned to Malden, Massachusetts, where they were originally incorporated in 1976.

=== The 1990s: The birth of a dynasty ===
With several of the club's players regularly representing New England and the East Coast in representative side play, the Mystics were committed to championship level rugby. Their reputation earned them respect overseas as well, with touring sides, such as the Glamorgan County RFC, seeking a challenge at top level rugby.

In 1989, Mystic River defeated their parent club Boston to win the first of seven straight New England championships. They would go on to win the Northeast Championship that same year. In 1992 the Mystic finished second in the US, losing to the Old Blues from California in the National Finals. The Mystics had established themselves as a force within the national rugby community.

=== The 2000s ===
In 2000 and 2001, Mystic River competed in the short lived Major League Rugby (a former amateur club competition not to be confused with the current professional Major League Rugby competition). Set up in the manner of the European Rugby Champions Cup, the MLR was designed to provide an additional competition structure for top division teams outside of their usual geographical unions and complement their USA Rugby competition schedule, however, it was never sanctioned by USA Rugby and the Mystics returned to competing solely in USA Rugby competition in the fall of 2001.

The 2007 season saw the Mystics win their first New England title after twelve years, moving on to take the Northeast Championship in 2008 and a spot in the National Division 1 Sweet 16. In their 2009–2010 season, Mystic River again took both the New England and Northeast Championships, making it through to the quarter-final round of the USA Rugby DI National Championship Series as well as making their first ever appearance in the National Sweet 16 in 7s competition. 2010 also marked the expansion of the Mystic River Youth Rugby Program and the addition of the U-19 Mystic Eagles, who saw success in both 15s and 7s tournaments in their inaugural season.

=== 2014 merger with Middlesex ===
In 2014, Mystic River merged with cross-town rivals, the Middlesex Barbarians, in an effort to develop the game of rugby in the area. While the details of the merger allowed the forty-year-old rugby club to retain their name, Middlesex coach Josh Smith took over head coaching duties for the combined club, with former Eagle prop Jake Sprague as forwards coach, and Glen Mannering directing the backs, with the club now competing in both Division 1 and Division 2.

As the 2014–2015 season came to a close, the newly formed Mystics went undefeated at the top of the Division 1 table going into the playoffs. Post season wins against White Plains RFC and Kansas City earned them their first trip to the USA Rugby D1 Final Four tournament since 1992, while in D2 the Mystic Barbarians took the NERFU D2 Championship against division rival New Haven, eventually losing to New York Rugby Club in the USA Rugby D2 Round of 16 beginning a new era for Mystic Rugby.

The Mystics also saw success in 7s, qualifying for the 2015 USA Rugby Club 7s (USARC7) Championship Series for the second time in club history, losing in the Semifinal round to eventual tournament winners Seattle Saracens, but coming away with the bronze medal.

=== American Rugby Premiership (2015—present) ===
Beginning in the 2015–2016 season, Mystic River became a "de facto" member of the American Rugby Premiership (ARP), joining Life Running Eagles and fellow Atlantic North D1 clubs Boston RFC, NYAC, Old Blue and the Boston Irish Wolfhounds in the reformatted elite competition.

Though officially a member of the Atlantic North Division 1 Conference, the Mystics competed in the ARP and played all teams but Life. They finished their regular season with a record of 6 wins and 2 losses in their inaugural year in the elite competition, automatically securing a berth in the USA Rugby Championships quarter-final round as the number two seed in the Atlantic North Conference. A win over the Midwest Conference's number one seeded team would put the Mystics in the Final Four for the second year in a row, against ARP rivals Old Blue. In the final match of the Eastern Championship Series, a 10–5 win put Mystic River in the Division 1 National Championship for the first time since 1992. The Mystics would go to play the Western Conference Champions, the Austin Blacks in the USA Rugby Emirates Airline Club Men's Division I National Championship. After a hard-fought match, Mystic River won their first ever National Title by a score of 45–33.

At the beginning of the 2016–2017 season Mystic River became a full member of the ARP, making it through to the Eastern Division finals. However, they were knocked out by NYAC 14–24. The following season the Mystics were able shock the favored Norfolk Blues 36–22 to set up a revenge match with their New York rivals, beating NYAC 26—25 and earning a trip to the 2018 national championship game. In the final match, Mystic River were able to stay ahead of their Western conference counterparts, Belmont Shore RFC and win their second national title by a score of 25–24.

=== Boston Mystics and Major League Rugby ===
Mystic River, which was called Boston Mystic or Mystics in some press releases, were scheduled for several 2018 exhibition games in Major League Rugby (MLR). Though they were merely exhibition, these matches were the first taste of the MLR professional era in the New England market. In late 2018, the New England Free Jacks were announced as a 2020 expansion team in MLR and Mystic River subsequently became a main source of talent for the initial Free Jacks roster including head coach Josh Smith. For the Free Jacks' first exhibition match against Ontario in October 2018, there were 15 former Mystic River players on their roster, including coaches Smith and Kareem Afifi.

==== 2018 season ====
Date	Opponent	Home/Away	Result
March 24	Rugby United New York	Away	Lost, 0–50
March 31	Rugby United New York	Home	Lost, 24–42
April 21	Ontario Arrows	Home	Lost, 19–29
May 5	Ontario Arrows	Away	Lost, 8–77

== National / representative players ==
=== USA Eagles ===
This is a list of players who currently or have at one time played for the Mystics and have represented their country with the United States national rugby union team, also known as the Eagles, in rugby fifteens or sevens. Not represented in this list are the many Mystics who have been named to the Eagles' player pools or Junior sides over the years. For Rugby sevens players, (*) denotes tournament appearances such as World Rugby Sevens Series.

Player name	Rep Year(s)	Caps	Pts	Debut	Date
Dimitri Efthimiou	2010	1*	0	2010–11 IRB Sevens World Series	21 January 2010
Pono Haitsuka	2013–2014	8*	49	2013–14 IRB Sevens World Series	29 November 2013
Tavite Lopeti	2021–	5	5	United States v New Zealand	23 October 2021
Alec Montgomery	1986–1989	6	0	United States v Canada	8 November 1986
Anthony Purpura	2010–2017	8	5	United States v Russia	5 June 2010
Richard Tardits	1993–1999	24	10	United States v Australia XV	2 October 1993
Marcus Satavu	2014	2*	-	2014 Japan Sevens	22 March 2014
Jake Sprague	2009	1	0	United States vs Uruguay	14 November 2009
Mitch Wilson	2022–	3	15	United States vs Kenya	6 November 2022

=== All-Americans (USA U-20/U-23) ===
Below is a list of players who have received Rugby All-American honors. The Collegiate All-Americans rugby team is considered the USA's U23 national team, while the Junior All-Americans are the USA's U20 national team.

Player name	College/Club	Year(s)	XVs/7s	Team	Grade	Ref
Alex Brussard	Boston College High School	2008	XVs	First Team	U20	
Kyle Ciquera	St. Bonaventure University	2019	XVs	First Team	U23	-
Steve Dazzo	Dartmouth College	2015	XVs	Honorable Mention	U23	
Dimitri Efthimiou	Northeastern University	2013	7s	Honorable Mention	U23	
Chris Frazier	Northeastern University	2015	7s	First Team	U23	
Pono Haitsuka	Oregon State University	2013	7s	First Team	U23	
Martin Keuchkerian	Mystic River U19	2017	XVs	First Team	U20	
Ian Luciano	New England College	2016	XVs	Honorable Mention	U23	
Dylan Lubbe	Brigham Young University	2009, 2010, 2012	XVs	First Team, Honorable Mention	U23	
Trevor McKenzie	Amoskeag Youth Rugby	2007	XVs	First Team	U20	-
Brian Raposo	Bridgewater State University	1998, 1999	XVs	First Team	U23	-
Akinola Raymond	Maryland Exiles	2012	7s	First Team	U20	
John Sullivan	St. Bonaventure University	2016	XVs	Honorable Mention	U23	
Erik Thompson	UCLA	2013-2015	XVs	First Team	U20	
Chris Tofte	Amoskeag Youth Rugby	2005, 2006	XVs	First Team	U20	-

=== Other Nations ===
This is a list of Mystic River players who have represented other nations in rugby union fifteens or sevens, unless otherwise indicated. Players marked with a "♦" represented other nations in rugby league.

- (Austria) David Barry (AUT)
- (Republic of Ireland) Declan Brady (IRL) ♦
- (England) Steve Brain (ENG)
- (British Virgin Islands) Sean Burgess (BVI)
- (Jamaica) Mikel Facey (JAM)
- (Mexico) Marcos Flegmann (MEX)
- (Canada) Ethan Fryer (CAN U-20)
- (Uganda) Joseph Lusse (UGA U-19)
- (Botswana) Molibi Maphanyane (BOT)
- (Israel) Guy Matisis (ISR)
- (South Africa) Herman Mostert (RSA)
- (Trinidad and Tobago) Jeron Pantor (TTO)
- (Tonga) Etuini Pongi (PAC)
- (Lebanon) Mikhael Shammas (LEB) ♦
- (Kenya) Edwin Shimenga (KEN)
- (Samoa) Alatasi Tupou (SAM)
- (Fiji) Alfred Uluinayau (FIJ)
- (Indonesia) Kyle Winter (INA)

== Championships ==
=== Fifteens (Division 1) ===
- New England Champions (1989–1995, 2009, 2015)
- Northeast Champions (1989, 1991, 2007, 2009–2012, 2015)
- Eastern Champions (1991, 2016, 2018)
- National champions (2016, 2018)
- National Playoff Appearances:

Playoff Round	Appearances	Year(s)
Sweet Sixteen	8	1989, 1991, 2008 2009, 2010, 2011, 2012, 2015
Quarter Finals	8	1992, 2010, 2011, 2012, 2015, 2016, 2017, 2018
Semi Finals	4	1992, 2015, 2016, 2018
National Finalist	3	1992, 2016, 2018

=== Fifteens (Division 2) ===
- New England Champions (2015, 2016, 2017)
- National Playoff Appearances:

Playoff Round	Appearances	Year(s)
Sweet Sixteen	3	2015, 2016, 2017
Quarter Finals	0	
Semi Finals	0	
National Finalist	0	

=== Sevens ===
- USA Rugby Club 7s Championship Series

Year	Seeded	Round	Result	Source
2010		Sweet Sixteen	13th	
2015		Bronze Medal Match	3rd (bronze)	
2016		Quarterfinals	8th	
2018		Bronze Medal Match	3rd (bronze)	
2019	8th	Sweet Sixteen	14th	
2021	11th	Sweet Sixteen	13th	
2022		Sweet Sixteen	11th	
2023	12th	Sweet Sixteen	16th	
2025	11th	Bronze Medal Match	4th	

== U19/Youth rugby ==
Mystic River founded their Youth Rugby program in 2005. It was originally aimed more at introducing local children in the surrounding community to the sport of rugby, via American Flag Rugby (AFL) and later USA Rugby's newly developed "Rookie Rugby", a non-contact flag variant of the sport for younger children. In 2010, the Mystics expanded the program to include competitive U-17 and U-19 teams. Both levels saw immediate success, quickly becoming perennial contenders and medalists in such competitions as the Bay State Games.

The Mystics also field a Collegiate Select Side which selects stand out local collegiate rugby talent and plays teams both in the United States and abroad. In 2015, several former members of the Mystic Youth program would go on to receive collegiate All Conference honors.

After an undefeated season in 2017, the Mystic River U19 7s team accepted an invitation to the National High School Invitational 7s tournament held in Minneapolis, MN, marking the first time any Mystic youth program was invited to play in a national championship. The Mystics continued their undefeated record throughout the tournament and claimed their first ever national championship title.
