= Pine Banks =

Park in Massachusetts, United States

Coordinates: 42°26′33.54″N 71°03′44.03″W

Pine Banks Main Entrance

Pine Banks is a 107.5-acre (0.435 km^{2}) park located in the cities of Malden and Melrose, Massachusetts. It was donated by former Mayor of Malden Elisha S. Converse to be used "forever as a public park". The agreement was that both towns had equal ownership, responsibility, and power, which is still the case today; the non–profit Board of Trustees owns the park, with equal representation from both cities.

The land of the park area was once owned by the Neponset band of the Massachusett Native American Tribe. It was later owned by the Lynde family in the early 18th century, and then the Converse Family (1881) who established it as the public park that it is today. The Park was designed by Frederick Law Olmsted and opened to the public in 1889.

== Geography ==
The structure of Pine Banks was formed millions of years ago when volcanoes (now inactive) and earthquakes shaped the area. As a result, there are rocky cliffs throughout the park, and even a fault line just south of the park. In addition to that, thousands of years ago, receding glaciers formed an esker which can be seen at the park as an elevated path.

The largest cliff, which is made of solid bedrock, rises 40–50 feet straight up to form Mount Ephraim, which overlooks the whole park from the southern border. This is the highest point, but not the only point of elevation in the park. There are other, smaller hills and cliffs.

There is a small shallow pond north of Mount Ephraim that was sometimes called Island Pond but now is usually not named. The pond's banks are fairly marshy, making it a good home for frogs, turtles and snakes. It is highly unlikely that any fish call this pond home. It is sometimes stocked with fish for fishing tournaments.

In addition to the pond, there are other small creeks and wetlands throughout the park. One of these small creeks once connected to the Malden River.

== Park facilities ==
The Playground Area

In addition to being a natural forest area, Pine Banks is also a recreational park. Centered in the park near the pond is a child's playground, containing swings, slides, and other equipment. In the playground there are also two long picnic tables sheltered by a roof. Many birthday parties are celebrated here, but reservations are required.

North of the wooded area there are several fields: One softball field, two full size baseball fields, a 400 meter track with soccer field inside it, and a newly renovated Rugby field. Many sporting events are held at these fields, including soccer games. There are many lights that sufficiently light up the fields for night games. Parking is located near the fields.

Pine Banks once contained a golf course, but that is no longer in existence. The course was where the present-day fields are.

There was once a zoo that was home to such animals as goats, donkeys, peacocks, ducks and other assorted animals. The zoo was removed in the early to mid-1990s.

The park also contains an international regulation-size rugby pitch and is home to the Mystic River Rugby Club (Rugby Union), the current 2018 Division 1 USA Rugby Champions.

== Gallery ==
Playground Area

A view from atop Mount Ephraim

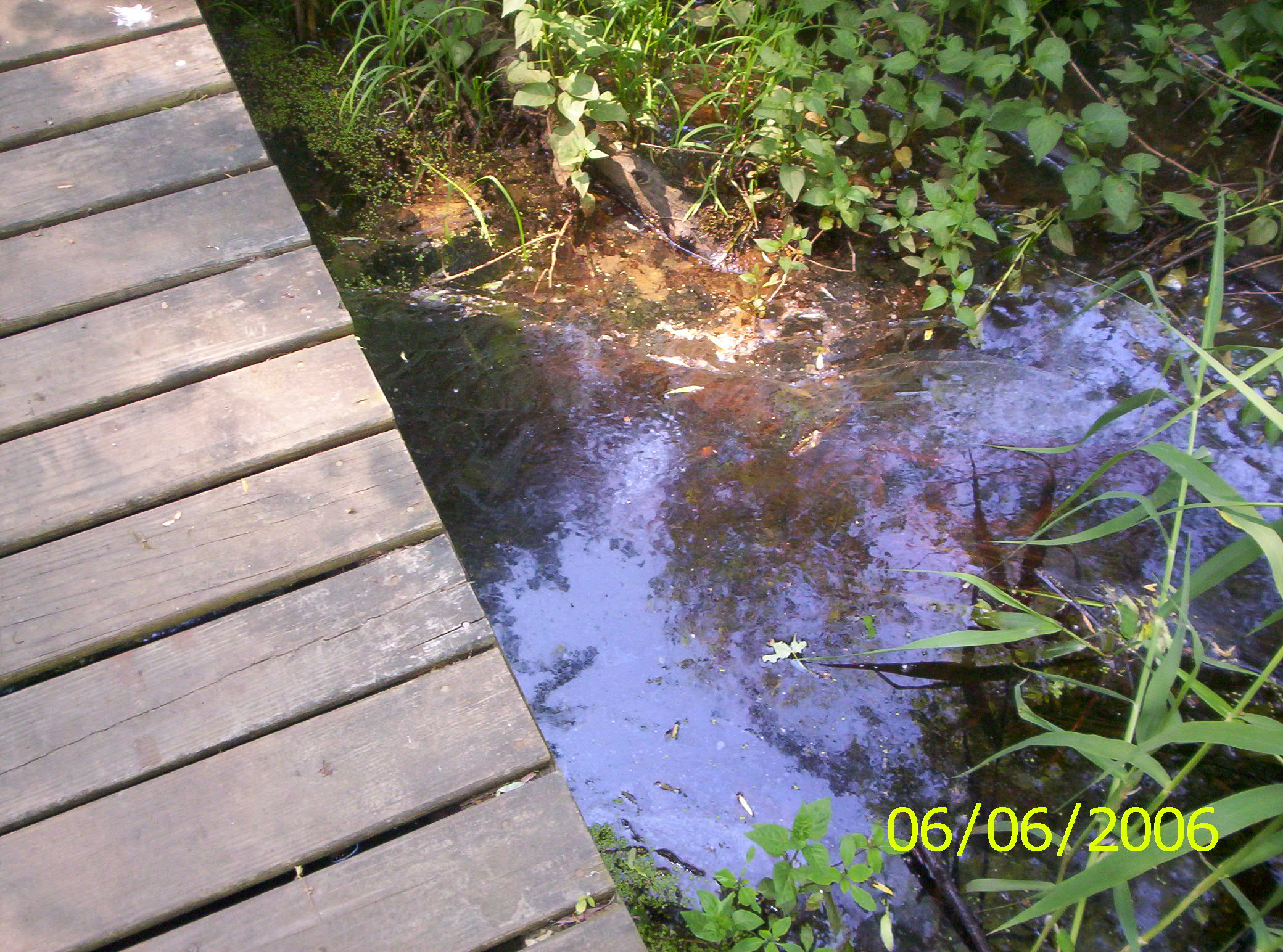
A view of a creek from a small footbridge

A sunset as seen through trees in Pine Banks

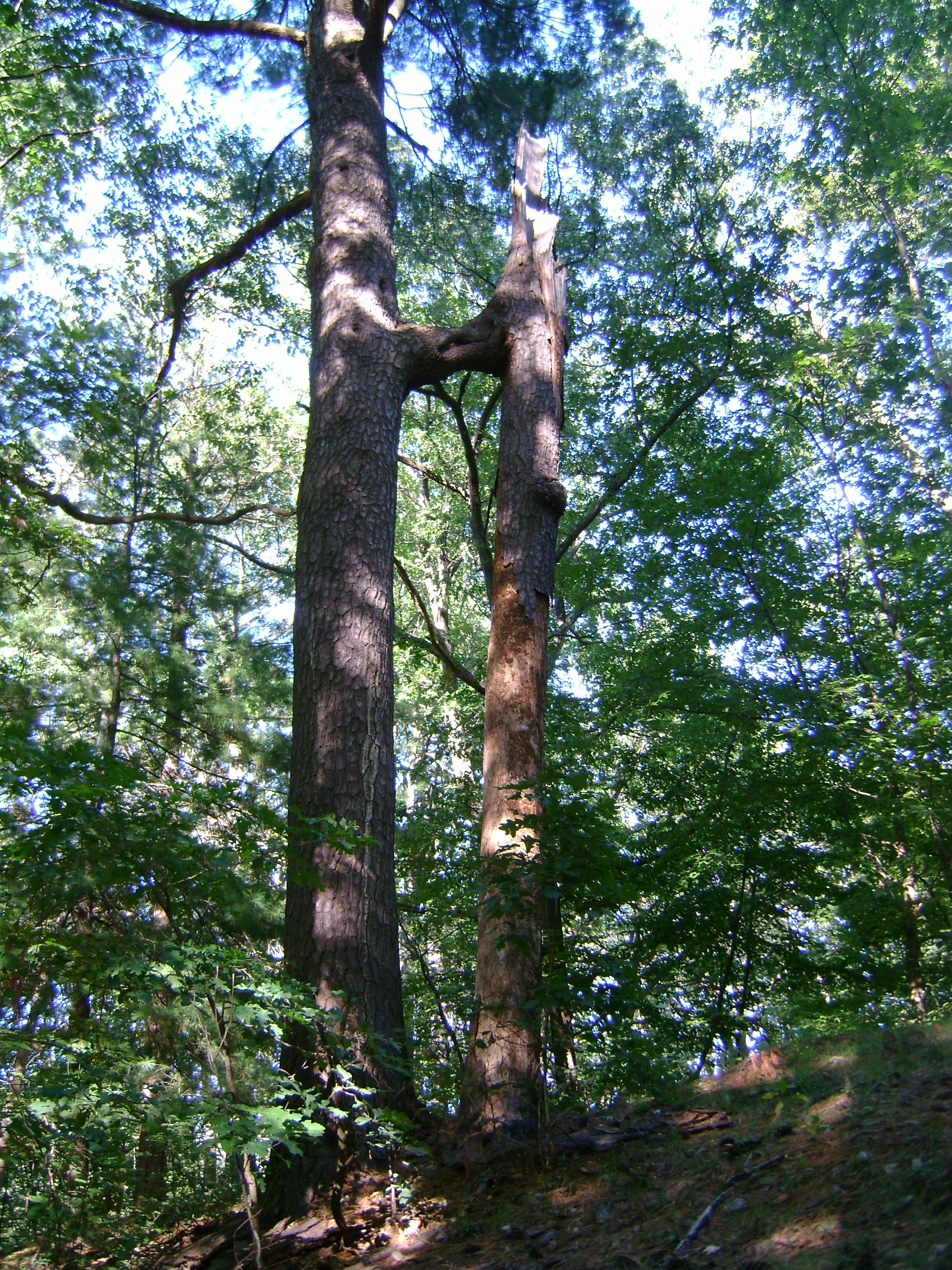
a conjoined tree in Pine Banks Park
