= Pono Haitsuka =

US rugby union player (born 1991)

- Born: Ryne "Pono" Haitsuka; July 18, 1991 (age 35) Kaneohe, Hawaii
- Height: 1.72 m (5 ft 8 in)
- Weight: 79.4 kg (175 lb; 12.50 st)
- University: Oregon State University

Rugby union career
- Position: scrum half/fly-half
Senior career
Years	Team	Apps	(Points)
2014–2016	Mystic River	20	(25)
2016	San Diego Breakers	9	(5)
National sevens team
Years	Team		Comps
2013–2014	United States		8

Ryne "Pono" Haitsuka (born 18 July 1991) is an American professional rugby union player. He has played with such teams as Mystic River in the American Rugby Premiership and the San Diego Breakers in the PRO Rugby competition. He has also represented the United States as a member of the United States national rugby sevens team.

== USA national sevens team ==
Haitsuka attended Kamehameha Schools in Honolulu where he played American football, wrestling, and track and field. He later studied psychology at Oregon State University where he made the switch to rugby. As a member of OSU's rugby team, Haitsuka became a standout player, earning All-American honors in 2013 and a spot on USA Rugby's developmental side at the Serevi RugbyTown 7s. Haitsuka put his collegiate studies on hold to attended the USA 7s training camp at the Olympic Training Center in San Diego and in November 2013, was named to the national team roster. He made his USA Eagles debut at 2013 Dubai Sevens and scored his first try in the tournament’s Shield Semifinal against France.

== Club rugby career ==
=== Mystic River Rugby Club ===
Haitsuka played with Boston-based Mystic River in the American Rugby Premiership. Haitsuka made over 20 appearances with the club between 2014–2016, helping them reach the National Championship Series in 2015, where they would eventually fall to NYAC in the Final Four. He also played with Mystic's sevens side, who finished third in the nation at the 2015 USA Rugby Club 7s (USARC7) Championship Series

=== San Diego Breakers ===
In 2016, Haituska signed with the San Diego Breakers in the upstart PRO Rugby competition, making 13 appearances before the league folded in 2017.
