= Ciwa Griffiths =

American educator and speech therapist

- Born: February 1, 1911; Suva, Fiji
- Died: December 3, 2003 (aged 92); Laguna Hills, California
- Known for: auditory-verbal therapy

Ciwa Griffiths (1 February 1911 – 3 December 2003) was an American speech therapist and pioneer of auditory-verbal therapy and universal neonatal hearing screening.

== Life ==
Griffiths was born in Suva, Fiji. She was the ninth of ten children. Her mother Jennie Scott Wilson, a feminist and pacifist, was born in Texas and her father, Arthur George Griffiths, in Fiji. Her grandfather, George Littleton Griffiths had founded the Fiji Times in Levuka in 1869, where her mother worked as a reporter and wrote the editorials. The family lived in Suva, Sydney, Brisbane, Texas, California and experienced the hard times of the two world wars and the Great Depression.

She received her Bachelor of Arts degree from San Francisco State College in 1932. In the midst of the Depression she found no work until Roosevelt founded the Works Progress Administration (WPA).

In 1937 she began teaching in a one-room school in Monterey County, California where a deaf child gave the impetus for her to turn to education for the deaf. Previously, she had obtained credential admission to elementary school at San Francisco State College. In 1940-1941, she studied at the Clarke School for the Deaf in Massachusetts, received a Master of Science degree from the University of Massachusetts and was admitted to teach the deaf at the Clarke School. She trained in pedaudiology with Edith Whetnall at the Audiology Unit of the Royal National Throat, Nose and Ear Hospital in London in 1954. There she was able to observe for the first time how deaf children could learn to speak normally with amplification combined with auditory-verbal therapy if one started with it in the first three years.

In 1954 she founded the Hear Foundation in Eagle Rock, Los Angeles, California. Later, the Foundation was renamed Hear Center and moved to her home in Pasadena, California.

In 1955, she received her doctorate in education from the University of Southern California.

In the 1950s, she began using bilateral (two hearing aids) full-time amplification for deaf babies and infants. She provided hearing aids to babies as young as one month old. At that time, it was thought that hearing aids could not be given to children under six years of age. However, her observations and experience showed that residual hearing could be optimized to allow integration into the natural environment and mainstream schooling. Improved audiometry in the 1980s found that 97% of the students in schools for the deaf had enough residual hearing to benefit from hearing aids and speech education. It was also in favour of the intensive involvement of parents, that they were informed, committed and consistent in their hearing education. In the 1970s, she organized the world's first two international conferences on the use of hearing technology for deaf children. This resulted in a new organisation, the Auditory-Verbal International (AVI) (today AG Bell Academy).

Griffiths died on 3 December 2003 in Laguna Hills, California, Orange County, California.

== Work ==
Griffith's life's work included the field of hearing and learning to hear and speak. She was a pioneer of hearing tests, hearing training and hearing education. She was one of the first people to realize that regardless of the degree of deafness it was possible to hear with a hearing aid and its use in young children allowed them to grow up as part of the hearing world.

While the use of hearing aids on babies, universal neonatal hearing screening, has become routine in some countries today. Back then, Griffiths pushed to get the state to pass a law that made hearing screening at birth mandatory. She also ensured that the law was followed.

She did not focus on individual speech sounds, but developed speed, rhythm and speech. She knew that if a deaf child could learn to hear with the help of hearing aids during the maturation period of speech development of up to 3.5 years, the child would then learn speech naturally. She made the experience that early hearing screening, informed, committed and assertive parents, the immediate use of improved hearing aids with strong and adaptable amplification, allowed deaf or hard of hearing children to become part of the hearing world.

In the 1950s, when providing deaf infants with bilateral hearing aids, Griffiths discovered that the hearing aids could be discontinued after a few months because the infants had now developed normal hearing ability. There were exceptions that still needed to be fitted with hearing aids because of neural defects (rubella, meningitis, heredity). Their clinical study of 21 deaf infants from 1969 to 1973 showed that 67% of the infants who participated in the study and were fitted with hearing aids by the age of 8 months developed normal hearing, while this was not the case in any of the infants who received hearing aids after 8 months.

When Griffiths realized that the first months of life were crucial for normal hearing development, she began to advocate general hearing tests for newborns in 1964. She created the blueprint for California's first neonatal hearing screening program in 1966 and continued to do so until the State of California passed legislation in 1984 (Legislative Mandates) and 1998 making hearing screening at birth mandatory. In a similar study conducted by otologist Arpad Götze at the ENT Clinic of the Janos Hospital in Budapest, Hungary from 1978 to 1981 with 68 deaf infants, 51 (75%) developed normal hearing. In 12 infants, hearing did not improve, 10 of them only wore the hearing aid from 10 months, and in the remaining 5 the results could not be followed up.

The use of Griffith's Auditory Approach - although at the time ridiculed by the medical establishment - became a standard application in American hospitals. Over the years, the Hear Center has received international recognition for its innovations and extensive testing and therapy programs. As the inventor, she acquired a United States patent for aids and techniques for testing newborns for hearing loss. These test procedures were particularly valuable for deaf infants under 8 months of age, because they allowed hearing aids to be fitted before the critical period of 8 months, which enabled the majority of them to develop normal hearing within months.

Deaf children remind me of butterflies: At first encased within a cocoon of deep silence not of their making, and then when sound and cadences of love reach them, they emerge in all their individual colors, in soft or brilliant hue.

— Ciwa Griffiths: Come Out, Little Butterfly

== Publications ==
- Patterns, Crown Publications 1941
- A study of the ability of deaf children in grouping, accentuation, and phrasing of movements of the individual speech organs versus syllables, 1941
- The utilization of individual hearing aids in young deaf children. University of Southern California dissertations and theses, Los Angeles CA 1955
- Til forever is past; poems, Exposition Press 1967
- Conquering childhood deafness; a new technique for overcoming hearing problems in infants and children; report on ten years of HEAR Foundation achievements. Exposition Press 1967 (Im Bestand von 223 Bibliotheken weltweit)
- Proceedings of the 1st International Conference on Auditory techniques, Pasadena, California, sponsored by the HEAR Foundation in conjunction with the San Diego Speech and Hearing Center and Oralingua Staff. Thomas publisher 1974, ISBN 0398030472
- The Hear Foundation (Film), 1975 A documentary film about the Hear Foundation in Pasadena, California, in which director Ciwa Griffiths and a deaf child take a tour of the testing facilities and remedial classes for deaf infants and younger children.
- The auditory approach: its rationale, technique, and results. Audiology & Hearing Education 1975 Effective
- with J. Ebbin: Effectiveness of early detection and auditory stimulation on the speech and language of hearing impaired children. HEAR Center 1978
- Proceedings of the 2nd International Conference on Auditory Techniques, 1979
- HEAR: A Four-Letter Word. Autobiografie und Geschichte der Gehörlosenerziehung. Wide Range Press 1991, ISBN 0963070908
- One out of ten. Autobiografie, Wide Range Press 1993, ISBN 0963070959
- Why the dragon breathes fire. Wide Range Press 1995, ISBN 0963070916
- The HEAR-Center
