= Nifa and Nishan Hindes =

British identical twin models

Nifa and Nishan Hindes (born 7 August 1979 in Gloucestershire, United Kingdom) are British identical twin models, born to an English father and an Indian-Fijian mother.

They have been featured on the cover of Asian Women magazine, in Top Model magazine, in People magazine (including being listed on their "50 most beautiful people" in 1998), and in FHM as "100 Sexiest Women in the World" in 2003 as #92, and as Foster's Pitgirls, for Grand Prix motor racing.

They have had television appearances on shows such as Sex & Chocolate and The Young Person's Guide to Becoming a Rock Star, as well as in the television movie Homer's the Odyssey. They were also cast in a small roles in Star Wars: Episode I – The Phantom Menace, as the twin twi'lek slaves of the pod racer, Sebulba.

They are both 5' 11", with 34-25-35 measurements, and represented by Storm Models modelling agency.
