= Jake Sprague =

American rugby union player

- Born: Jacob Sprague; December 27, 1984 (age 41) Boston, Massachusetts
- Height: 1.83 m (6 ft 0 in)
- Weight: 113 kg (249 lb)

Rugby union career
- Position: Prop
Amateur team(s)
Years	Team	Apps	(Points)
2004-2009	Mystic River Rugby Club		
2009-2010	New York Athletic Club		
International career
Years	Team	Apps	(Points)
2009 - 2010	USA	2	
Coaching career
- Years: Team
- 2012-present: Mystic River Rugby Club

Jacob "Jake" Sprague (born December 27, 1984) is an American rugby union player and coach. He was born in Boston, Massachusetts. Sprague began his rugby career with the Babson College rugby union team, and later played at club level with Division 1 Mystic River Rugby Club. He later played for New York Athletic Club RFC in the Rugby Super League.

Sprague has played prop for the USA Eagles XV side. He was selected to tour with the USA Eagles squad for the Autumn 2010 tour of Europe. His international debut was in November 2009 against Uruguay.
