= United States national rugby team =

United States national rugby team may refer to:

== Rugby union ==
- United States national rugby union team, nicknamed the "Eagles"
- United States women's national rugby union team, nicknamed the "Eagles"
- United States national rugby sevens team
- United States women's national rugby sevens team

== Rugby league ==
- United States national rugby league team, nicknamed the "Hawks"
- United States women's national rugby league team, nicknamed the "Hawks"
