= New Haven Old Black RFC =

(United States) New Haven Old Black RFC
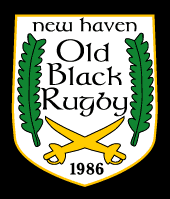
- Full name: New Haven Old Black Rugby Football Club
- Union: New England Rugby Football Union
- Founded: 1986
- Ground(s): Boulevard Field; New Haven, Connecticut
- President: (United States) Nikita Guryakov

Official website
- www.nhrugby.com

The New Haven Old Black Rugby Football Club is a rugby club in New Haven, Connecticut. They play in Division II of the Empire Rugby Union.

Founded in 1986, they play at Boulevard Field in New Haven. The club's colors are black, green and gold.

== History ==
=== 1980s ===
Prior to the start of the club in the Spring of 1986, there was no rugby in the Greater New Haven area. A group of Southern Connecticut State University graduates, led by Robert Chester, applied for membership of the NERFU. The NERFU accepted the petition and the club was allowed to play on a probationary basis.

After initially feeling the strain of a minimum of two games a week, Old Black went on to have a highly successful inaugural season, culminating in the win of the Connecticut Cup by upsetting Providence in the final. They were awarded full membership of the NERFU in the Fall of 1986.

=== 1990s ===
The year 1993 saw a restructuring of the club, owing to the retirement of a number of the club's early members. That season, Old Black returned to Division II, having been promoted to Division I a couple of years earlier. They elected to remain there for the next 10 years, and it was seen as a wise move. In 2002 they won the NERFU Division II title; three years after their return to Division II.

=== 2000s ===
In 2000 they qualified for the Elite 8 of Division II, followed by a Sweet 16 appearance in 2001. 2002 was the year the club won the national Division II title and was again promoted to Division I, where they played until 2013, where they were assigned to Division II.

== Notable former players ==
- (New Zealand) Kahn Fotuali'i, Samoa scrum-half
- (Fiji) Andrew 'Tui' Osborne, Eagles wing/fullback (one cap)
- Jacko Ah Hoy, Eagles sevens

== Honors ==
- USA Rugby Division II National Champions:
  - 2002
- USA Rugby Division II Elite 8 Appearances:
  - 2000
  - 2002
  - 2014
- USA Rugby Division I Sweet 16 Appearances:
  - 2004
  - 2006
  - 2007
  - 2009
- USA Rugby Division II Sweet 16 Appearances:
  - 2000
  - 2001
  - 2002
  - 2014
- NERFU Division II Champions:
  - 1996
- Connecticut Cup:
  - 1986
