= Fijians =

Ethnic group native to Fiji

iTaukei Indigenous Fijians
kaiViti
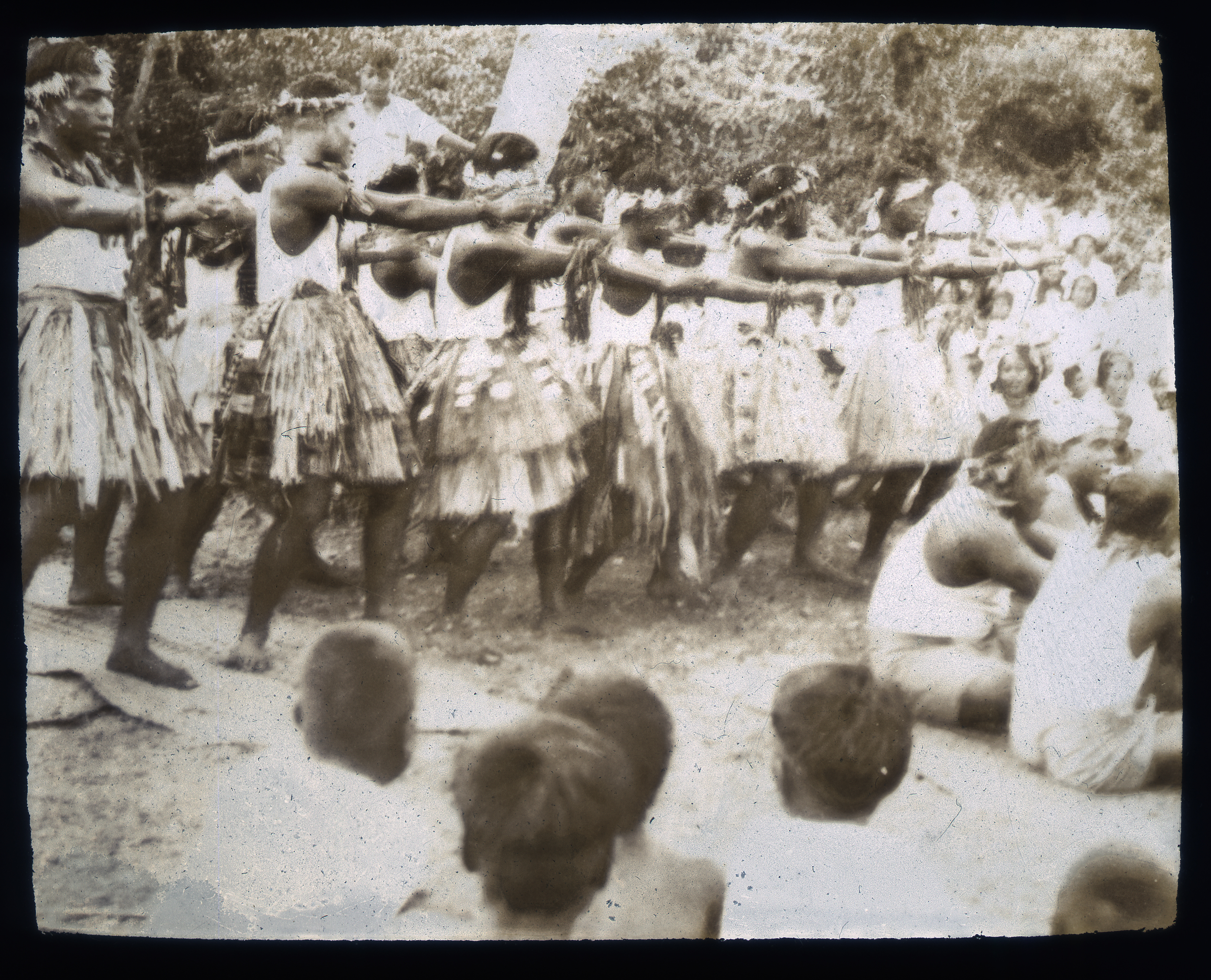
- Fijian dance

Total population
- c. 615,000

Regions with significant populations
- Fiji: 475,739
- Australia: 68,947
- United States: 54,006
- Canada: 25,180
- New Zealand: 25,038
- United Kingdom: 20,000
- Cook Islands: 1,000
- Kiribati: 1,000
- Japan: 342
- Norfolk Island: 47
- Italy: 41
- Taiwan: 16

Languages
- Fijian • English

Religion
- Christian (Methodist 66.6%; Roman Catholic 13.3%; Assemblies of God 6.2%; Seventh-day Adventist 5.1%, other 8.8%).

Related ethnic groups
- Papuans, Ni-Vanuatu, other Melanesian peoples, other Austronesian peoples, Indo-Fijians

Fijians (Fijian: iTaukei, lit. 'Owners [of the land]') are an Austronesian ethnic group native to Fiji, who speak Fijian and English and share a common history and culture.

Fijians, or iTaukei, are the major indigenous people of the Fiji Islands of Melanesia. Indigenous Fijians are believed to have arrived in Fiji from western Melanesia approximately 3,500 years ago and are the descendants of the Lapita people, who were a seafaring people originally from what is now Taiwan. Later they would move onward to other surrounding islands, including Rotuma, as well as settling in other nearby islands such as Tonga and Samoa. They are indigenous to all parts of Fiji except the island of Rotuma. The original settlers are now called "Lapita people" after a distinctive pottery produced locally. Lapita pottery was found in the area from 800 BCE onward.

As of 2005, indigenous Fijians constituted slightly more than half of the total population of Fiji. Indigenous Fijians are predominantly of Melanesian extraction, with some Polynesian admixture.

Australia has the largest Fijian expatriate population, according to the Ministry of Pacific Island Affairs. According to the Australian census, the largest ethnic backgrounds that Fijians identified with were Indian/Indo-Fijian and Indigenous Fijian origins. Fijian New Zealand are also the fifth largest Pacific ethnic group living in New Zealand. Outside Oceania, a notable Fijian diaspora is found in other Anglophone countries, namely Canada, United States and the United Kingdom.

The Bose Levu Vakaturaga (Great Council of Chiefs) once passed laws and regulations governing the indigenous Fijian people. Until its disbanding by the Military of Fiji following the 2006 coup, the Great Council of Chiefs met yearly to discuss native Fijian concerns. The council, which was formerly responsible for appointing Fiji's president, was composed of 55 Fijian chiefs selected from the 14 provinces. Included in the council were three appointees from the island of Rotuma and six appointed by the Minister of Fijian Affairs. The Minister of Fijian Affairs consulted with the President as part of the selection process. Former Prime Minister Sitiveni Rabuka was given a lifetime appointment on the council.

== Culture ==
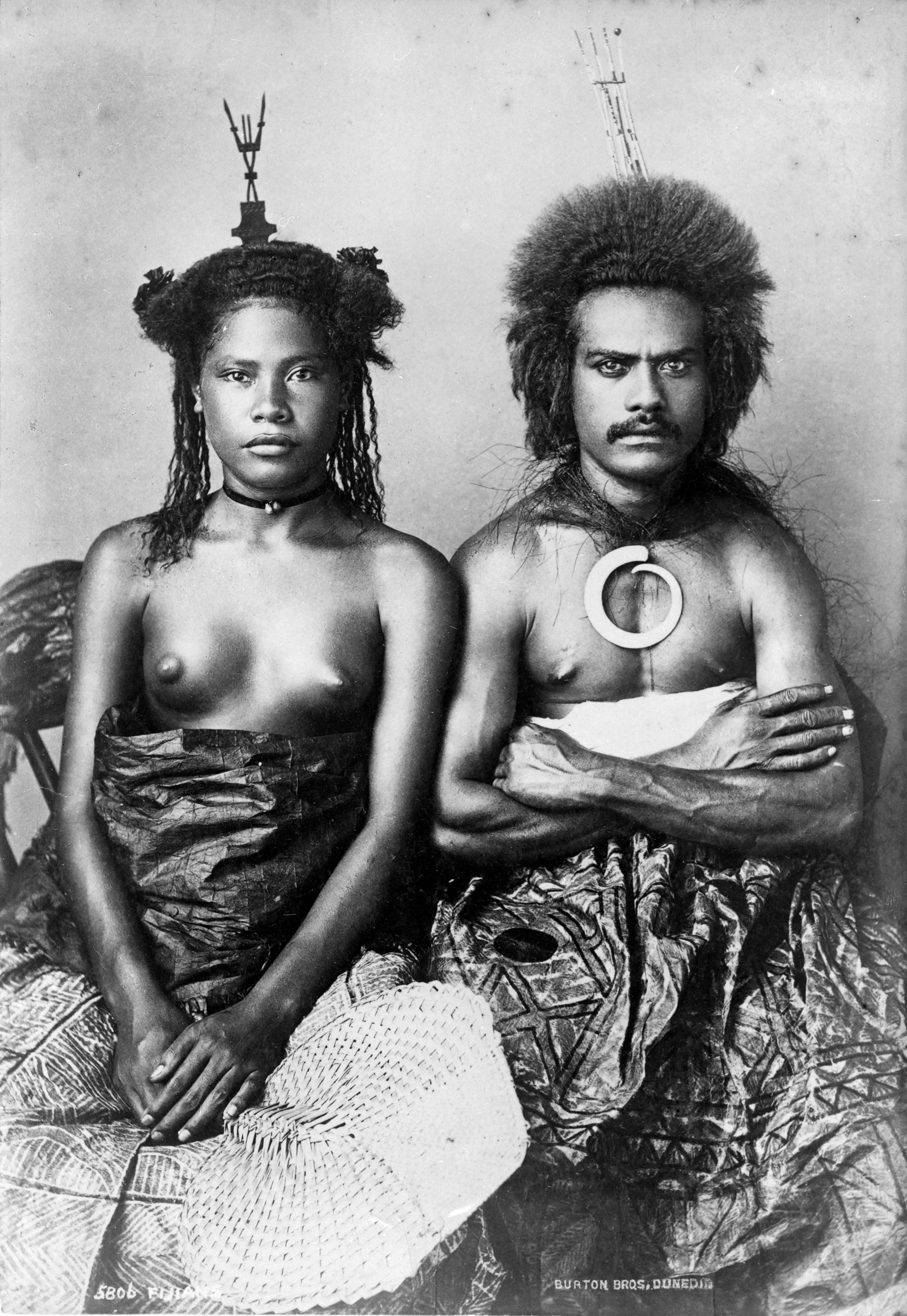
19th-century Fijian couple in traditional dress.

The native Fijian language belongs to the Central Pacific (Fijian – Polynesian) branch of the Austronesian family. The Fijian traditions are centred around ceremonies and events, that bond the community.

Yaqona (pronounced Yang-gohna), otherwise known as kava – another important traditional custom – is an infusion prepared from the root of Piper methysticum, a type of pepper plant. The plant itself is also often referred to as yaqona or the kava plant. Yaqona is extremely important in indigenous Fijian culture – in the time of the 'old religion' it was used ceremonially by chiefs and priests only. Today, yaqona is part of daily life, both in villages and in urban areas and across all classes and walks of life. 'Having a grog' or 'drinking grog', as drinking kava is sometimes known, is used for welcoming and bonding with visitors, for storytelling sessions or merely for passing time.

The Tabua is a much revered whale's tooth which is used in both public and private occasions or ceremonies. The tooth is considered sacred.

About 86 percent of the land in Fiji is owned by indigenous Fijian people. In 1876, Sir Arthur Hamilton-Gordon, the British colonial Governor, prohibited the sale of Fijian land to non-ethnic Fijians. This policy continues today, and in 2014 the sale of freehold land to foreigners was further restricted. The Governor also banned the employment of native Fijians as labourers, and in 1878, began importing indentured labourers from India to work in the sugarcane fields. The effects of this immigration created an ethnic polarisation and rampant Anti-Indian sentiment, which has proven to be politically challenging to Fijian race relations.

Indigenous Fijians overwhelmingly follow Christianity, with the Methodist Church of Fiji and Rotuma claiming the loyalty of 64.5% (2007 census). Other significant denominations include the Roman Catholic Church (9.1%), the Assemblies of God (5.7%) and the Seventh-day Adventists (3.9%). 10.4% belong to other churches from a large number of denominations. Islam is the third largest religion in Fiji (6.3%). Only about 0.8% report as following non-Christian religions or no religion.

Approximately 70% of indigenous Fijians are farmers, many of which are sustenance farmers. They commonly grow such crops as sugar cane, cassava, rice, sweet potatoes, and bananas.

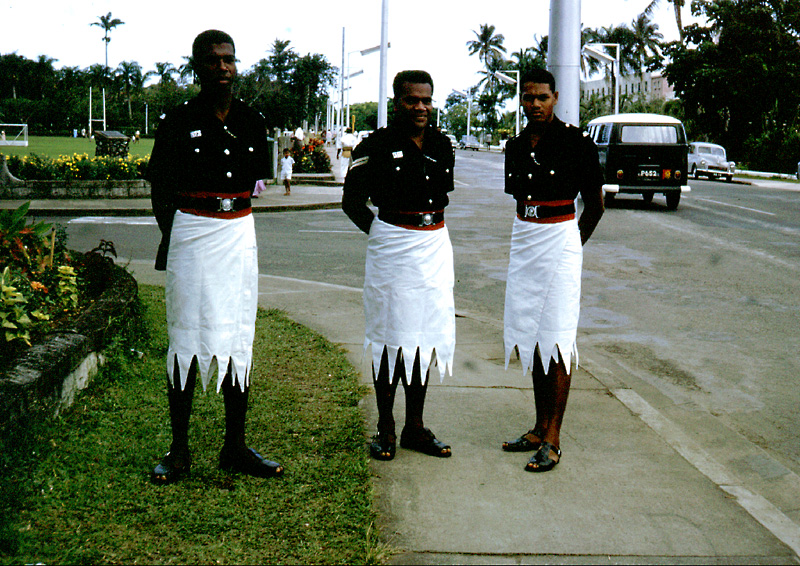
Fijian policemen in Suva, 1967

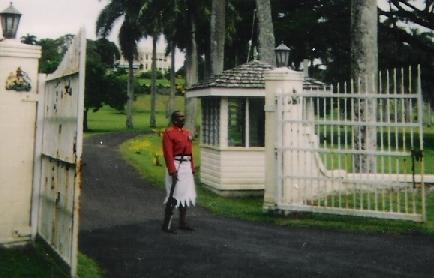
Guard outside the presidential palace in Suva, 2003

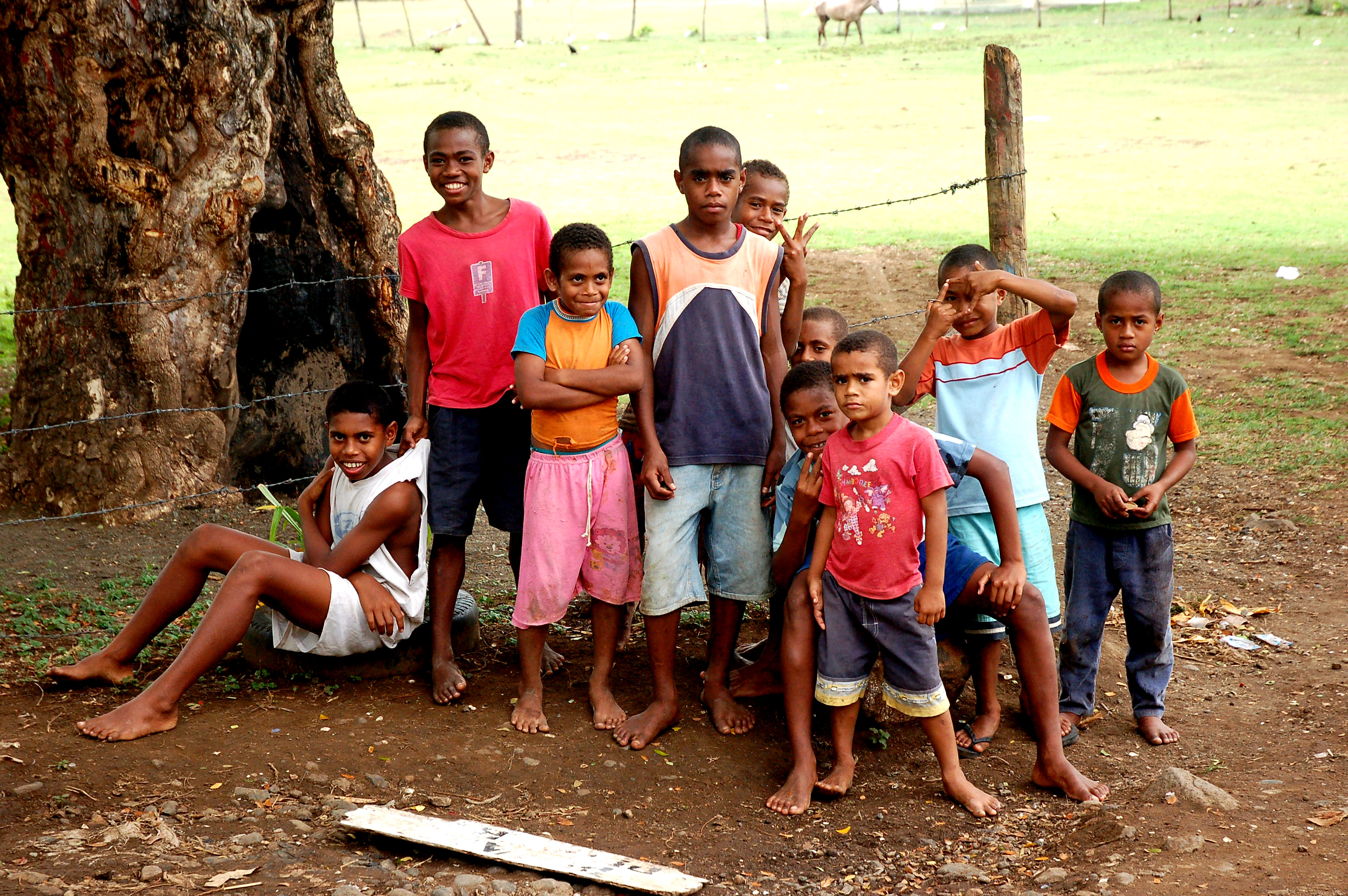
Group of Fijian children, 2008

== History ==
Historically, Fijians were known as the canoe building experts of the Pacific, using them to trade with Tonga. They were usually large double-hulled canoes, called a Drua (pronounced nDroo-ah), with each side being similar except one was shorter and served as a type of outrigger. These were united by beams, with a platform on it that extended beyond the sides.

The article on the History of Fiji offers a timeline of events.

The Lapita people, named after their distinctive pottery style, were the first people to inhabit Fiji in about 3000 BCE, and evidence of their settlements exist throughout Fiji – particularly around the Sigatoka Sand Dunes. They were followed by the Melanesians in about 500 BCE, and trading with Tongans and Samoans since Fiji was founded, has added to the cultural mix. In the Later years, there was active commerce between Tonga and Fiji, and later in the history of this relationship, the Fijians in the Lau Islands (Eastern Fiji) became vassals to the King of Tonga. One particular reason Tongans and Samoans came to Fiji was to build the Drua (large double-hulled canoes) which they could not build on their own islands because of the lack of proper timber.

From the early 19th century, both European and Chinese traders. The British ruled Fiji from 1874 to 1970. In 1970, Fiji became a fully independent nation with constitutional arrangements to ensure that traditional Fijian interests were preserved.

His Royal Highness Prince of Wales, Prince Charles, presented the Instruments of Independence to Prime Minister Ratu Sir Kamisese Mara on 10 October 1970 at a massive gathering at Albert Park in Suva. In 1972, the first general elections were held using the 1970 constitution. In 1987, two military coups were staged. The first coup was bloodless, and the second coup severed ties with the British Monarchy. A controversial and racially divisive new constitution was adopted in 1990, and in 1992 the first general election was held under the auspices of the new constitution.

The constitution was revised again in 1997 and was deemed to be more equitable by the many racial groups in Fiji. Free and peaceful elections in 1999 resulted in a government led by an Indo-Fijian, Mahendra Choudhary, but a violent coup in May 2000 ushered in a prolonged period of political and racial turmoil. Parliamentary elections held in August 2001 provided Fiji with a democratically elected government led by Prime Minister Laisenia Qarase. Re-elected in May 2006, Qarase was ousted in a military coup on 5 December that year, led by the Commander of the Republic of Fiji Military Forces(RFMF), Commodore Voreqe (Frank) Bainimarama, who initially appointed himself acting president, but in January 2007 assumed the position of interim Prime Minister, promising a return to democracy in the near future. This did not eventuate, however; elections were not held until 2014.

== Traditions and ceremonies ==
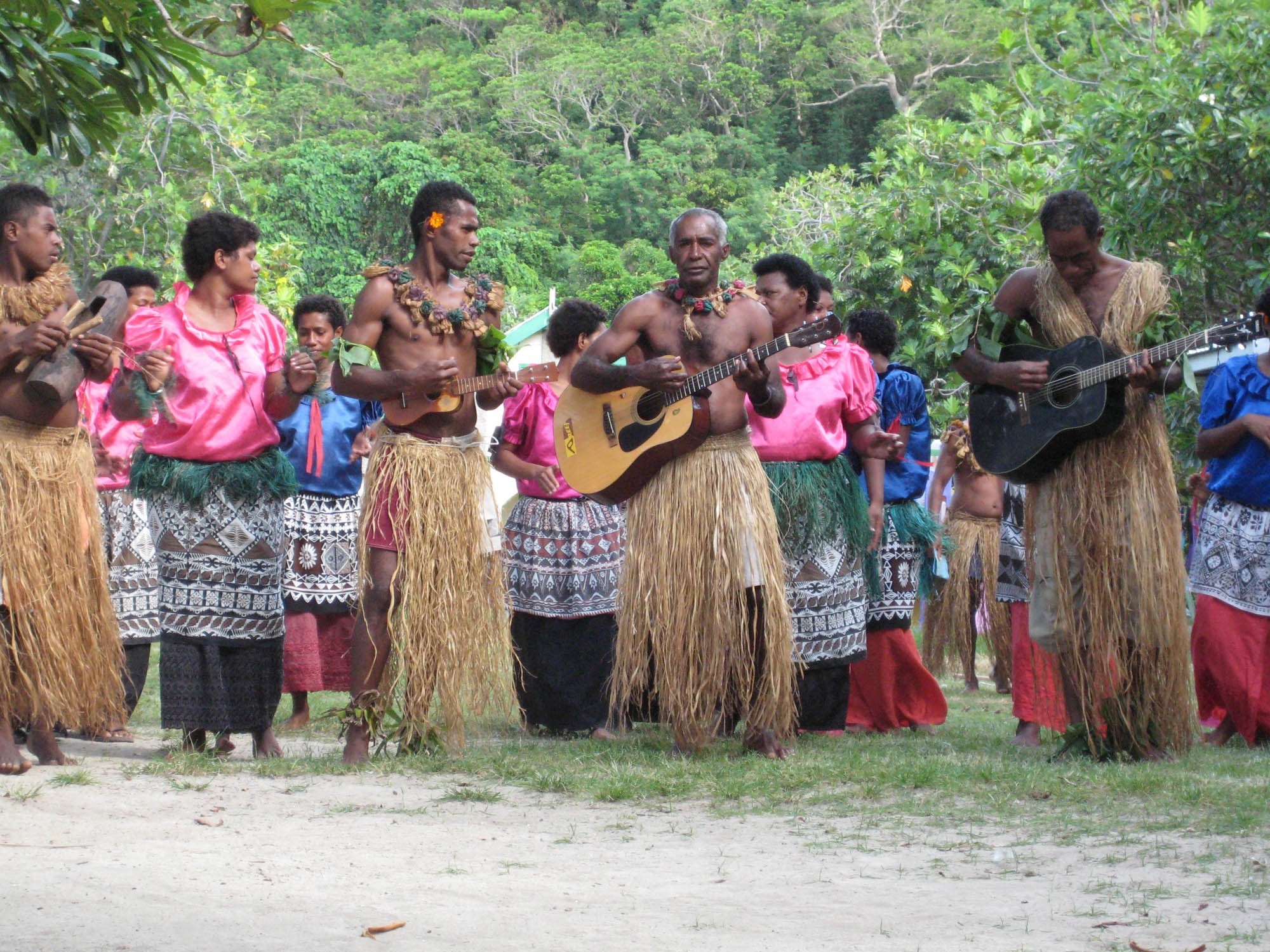
A traditional music show

Fijian traditions and ceremonies are rooted in the country's history and share commonalities throughout time.

== Name ==
In August 2008, shortly before the proposed People's Charter for Change, Peace and Progress was due to be released to the public, it was announced that it recommended a change in the name of Fiji's citizens. If the proposal were adopted, all citizens of Fiji, whatever their ethnicity, would be called "Fijians". Previously the word "Fijian" did not denote a nationality, and referred exclusively to indigenous Fijians. Citizens of Fiji were referred to as "Fiji Islanders". The proposal would change the English name of indigenous Fijians from "Fijians" to itaukei. The indigenous word for Fijian is "Kaiviti" Deposed Prime Minister Laisenia Qarase reacted by stating that the name "Fijian" belonged exclusively to indigenous Fijians, and that he would oppose any change in legislation enabling non-indigenous Fijians to use it. The Cabinet at its meeting on 30 June 2010 approved the Fijian Affairs [Amendment] Decree 2010. The new law effectively replaces the word 'Fijian' or 'indigenous' or 'indigenous Fijian' with the word 'iTaukei' in all written laws, and all official documentation when referring to the original and native settlers of Fiji. All Fiji citizens are now called 'Fijians'.

== See also ==
- Fijian Australian
- Fijians in the United Kingdom

== Other sources ==
- De Ricci, James Herman (1875). Fiji: Our New Province in the south Seas. London: E.Stanford. p. 332. OCLC 4803267.
- Ravuvu, Asesela (1983). Vaka i Taukei: The Fijian Way of Life, Suva: University of the South Pacific
- Thomas Williams; James Calvert; George Stringer Rose (1858). Fiji and the Fijians. Vol. 1, The islands and their inhabitants. London: Alexander Heylin. p. 266. OCLC 19529801.
