= Sports in Portland, Oregon =

Sporting activities in Portland, Oregon

Portland, Oregon, United States, is home to two teams from the major professional sports leagues in the United States and Canada — the Portland Trail Blazers of the National Basketball Association (NBA) and the Portland Timbers of Major League Soccer (MLS). In women's major leagues, the city hosts the Portland Fire of the Women's National Basketball Association (WNBA) and Portland Thorns FC of the National Women's Soccer League (NWSL). Portland also hosts a wide variety of other sports and sporting events.

== Current notable teams ==
=== Basketball ===
The Portland Trail Blazers have played in the National Basketball Association (NBA) since the 1970 season. The Trail Blazers have played in three NBA Finals (1977, 1990, 1992) and have won one NBA Championship (1977). Several of the Trail Blazers' former players are in the Basketball Hall of Fame, including Dražen Petrović, Bill Walton, Lenny Wilkens, Clyde Drexler, and Arvydas Sabonis. Furthermore, the team has retired several numbers including Terry Porter (#30), Maurice Lucas (#20), Larry Steele (#15).

The Portland Chinooks played in the International Basketball League at The Courts in Eastmoreland.

Portland will be home to the WNBA's Portland Fire in 2026, which will be Portland's second WNBA team after the original Portland Fire folded in 2002.

=== Hockey ===
The Western Hockey League's Portland Winterhawks have played in the city since 1976. They play their home games at the Veterans Memorial Coliseum. They have won three league championships (1982, 1998, 2013).

=== Soccer ===
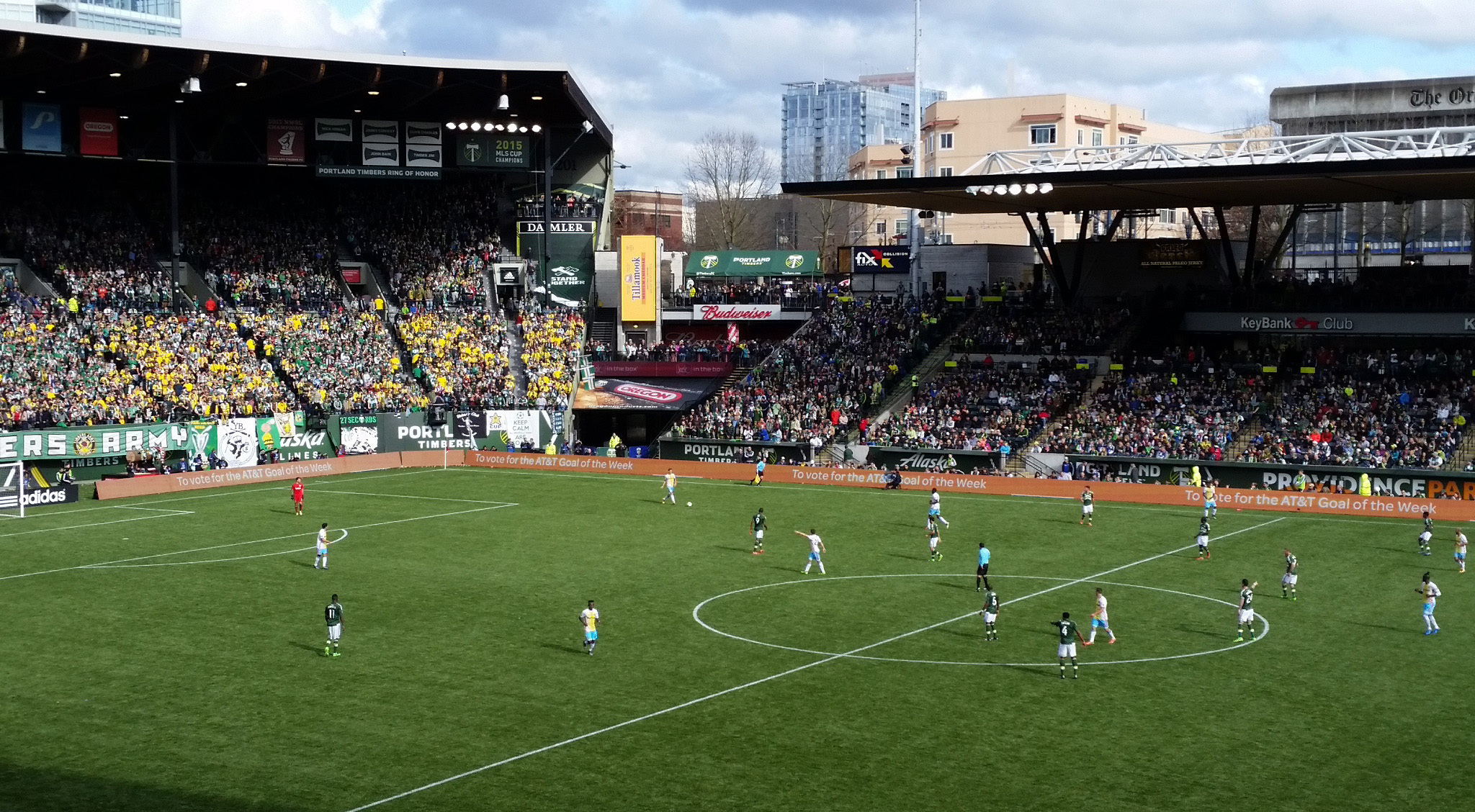
Providence Park is the home venue of the Portland Timbers (MLS)

The Portland Timbers joined Major League Soccer (MLS) in 2011 after having past incarnations from 1975–1982, 1985–1990 and 2001–2010. They play at Providence Park, where they average over 20,000 fans and routinely sell out matches. As of November 2013, the Portland Timbers had sold out the last 50 consecutive matches, and over 10,000 fans were on the wait list for season tickets. In 2015, they became the first team in the Northwest to win the MLS Cup.

The Portland Timbers 2 have been playing in the USL Championship since 2014. Portland Timbers 2 (often referred to as "T2") is the reserve squad of the (MLS) club Portland Timbers. The Portland Timbers 2 formerly played at Merlo Field but now play at Providence Park.

The Portland Timbers U23s have been playing in USL League Two since 2010 and play in Salem, Oregon at McCulloch Stadium.

In 2012, Portland Thorns FC and the National Women's Soccer League were officially formed, with both the team and the league beginning play in 2013. The Thorns won the championship in the inaugural NWSL season, won their second title in 2017, and they followed up in 2022 by winning the NWSL championship so became the first team have won the most titles in league history. And have led the league in attendance in each of its first seven seasons.

=== Baseball ===
Professional baseball was played nearly continuously in Portland from 1901 until 2010, absent only during the 1994 season. The original Portland Beavers were the longest lived team, playing every season from 1901 to 1972, though occasionally under a different name. Various minor league baseball teams played in Portland thereafter, including revived Beavers teams between 1978 and 1993 and again between 2001 and 2010. Since 2010, there has been no professional baseball played within Portland city limits.

Established in 2015 the Portland Pickles are an active team in the WCL (West Coast League). The Pickles play at Walker Stadium located inside Lents Park in SE Portland. In the summer of 2020, the WCL took a hiatus and the Portland Pickles formed the WWWL (Wild Wild West League), consisting of four teams: The Portland Pickles, The Portland Gherkins, The Gresham Greywolves, and The West Linn Knights. Beginning in 2013, the Hillsboro Hops have played at Ron Tonkin Field in the nearby suburb of Hillsboro, about 15 miles west of Portland. A farm team for the Arizona Diamondbacks, they play in the Northwest League.

In September 2024, the Portland Diamond Project announced that they had signed a letter of intent to purchase Zidell Yards to build a ballpark in an attempt to attract a Major League Baseball team to Portland.

== Major professional sports teams ==
Club	Sport	Current league	Championships	Venue	Founded
Portland Fire	Basketball	WNBA	0	Moda Center	2024
Portland Thorns FC	Soccer	NWSL	4 (2013, 2017, 2021 NWSL Challenge Cup, 2022)	Providence Park	2012
Portland Timbers	Soccer	MLS	1 (2015)	Providence Park	2009
Portland Trail Blazers	Basketball	NBA	1 (1977)	Moda Center	1970

== Other professional sports teams ==
Club	Sport	Current league	Championships	Venue	Founded
Hillsboro Hops	Baseball	Northwest League	3 (2014, 2015, 2019)	Hillsboro Hops Ballpark	2013
Oregon Ravens	American football	WNFC	0	Milwaukie High School	2019
Oregon Soar	Ultimate (sport)	WUL	0	TBA	2024
Oregon Steel	Ultimate (sport)	UFA	0	Providence Park	2022
PDX FC	Soccer	USL 2	0	La Salle Catholic High School Stadium	2017
Portland Bangers FC	Soccer	USL 2	0	Hilken Community Stadium	2025
Portland Cascade	Softball	AUSL	0	Hillsboro Ballpark	2026
Portland Cherry Bombs FC	Soccer	USL W League	0	Hilken Community Stadium	2025
Portland Paddlers	Table tennis	MLTT	1 (2026)	Oregon Convention Center	2023
Portland Pickles	Baseball	WCL	1 (2024)	Walker Stadium (baseball)	2018
Portland Timbers 2	Soccer	MLS Next Pro	0	Providence Park	2014
Portland Shockwave	American football	WFA	0	Hillsboro Stadium	2002
Portland Winterhawks	Hockey	WHL	5 (1981–82, 1983 Memorial Cup, 1997–98, 1998 Memorial Cup, 2012–13)	Veterans Memorial Coliseum	1976
Rip City Remix	Basketball	NBA G League	0	Chiles Center	2023
Rose City Rollers	Roller derby	WFTDA	5 (2015, 2016, 2018, 2019, 2024)	The Hangar at Oaks Amusement Park	2004
United PDX	Soccer	USL 2	0	Lincoln High School	2018

== College sports ==
Portland is home to two NCAA Division I programs: the Portland Pilots, of the University of Portland, and the Portland State Vikings, from Portland State University. Portland State offers football, basketball, women's volleyball, golf, soccer, track and field, tennis, softball, and cross country. The Vikings sponsor football in the FCS (formerly Division I-AA) level and play their games at Providence Park. Portland State is a member of the Big Sky Conference. The Portland Pilots are members of the non-football West Coast Conference and sponsor baseball, basketball, cross country, soccer, tennis, and track and field.

Major D1 NCAA college sports teams
Club	Sport	Founded	League	Venue (capacity)	Championships
Oregon State Beavers baseball	Baseball	1907	Division I (Pac-12)	Goss Stadium (3,587)	3 (last in 2018)
Oregon State Beavers men's basketball	Men's Basketball	1901	Division I (WCC)	Gill Coliseum (9,604)	0
Oregon State Beavers women's basketball	Women's Basketball	1971	Division I (WCC)	Gill Coliseum (9,604)	0
Oregon State Beavers football	Football	1893	Division I (Pac-12)	Reser Stadium (35,548)	0
Oregon State Beavers men's soccer	Men's Soccer	1988	Division I (WCC)	Paul Lorenz Field (1,500)	0
Oregon State Beavers softball	Softball	1975	Division I (Pac-12)	Kelly Field (750)	0
Portland Pilots baseball	Baseball	1955	Division I (WCC)	Joe Etzel Field (1,300)	0
Portland Pilots men's basketball	Men's Basketball	1922	Division I (WCC)	Chiles Center (4,852)	0
Portland Pilots women's basketball	Women's Basketball	1977	Division I (WCC)	Chiles Center (4,852)	0
Portland Pilots men's soccer	Men's Soccer	1988	Division I (WCC)	Merlo Field (4,892)	0
Portland Pilots women's soccer	Women's Soccer	1980	Division I (WCC)	Merlo Field (4,892)	2 (last in 2005)

== Other sports teams ==
- Australian rules football. Portland is home to the Portland Australian Rules Football Club of the USAFL, one of the oldest in the United States, having formed in 1998. The club includes both a men's team (Portland Steelheads) and a women's team (Portland Sockeyes). The Portland Steelheads and Sockeyes are both two time National Champions (winning in 2015 & 2016). The club also runs a small metro footy league. Portland holds the record attendance for an Australian Rules Football match (14,787), when visiting Australian Football League clubs Melbourne and West Coast Eagles competed at Civic Stadium in 1990
- Roller derby. The Rose City Rollers is an all-female Women's Flat Track Derby Association-affiliated league founded in 2004 with over 400 members. It consists of four home teams: the Heartless Heathers, the Break Neck Betties, the High Rollers, and the Guns N Rollers as well as the All-Star traveling team, the Wheels of Justice and the Axles of Annihilation the Travel B-Team, who represent the league in interleague bouts. Portland Men's Roller Derby is an all-male league established in 2009. The men's league plays by the current WFTDA roller derby ruleset
- Rugby league. Rose City Rugby League were formed in 2010 and are part of the AMNRL's Western Expansion
- Rugby union. Portland is home to four senior-level men's rugby union football clubs and two women's clubs that are sanctioned members of USA Rugby. In men's rugby, the Portland Rugby Football Club (est. 1961, Pigs), Oregon Sports Union Rugby Club (Jesters), and the Eastside Tsunami compete in Division II of the Pacific Northwest Rugby Football Union (PNRFU). Additionally, a gay and inclusive team, the Portland Lumberjacks compete in PNRFU men's division III. The ORSU Women's rugby team and the Portland women's rugby team compete in Women's Division II
- Underwater hockey, The Portland Rockfish
- Tennis. Team Portland Tennis is a gay and lesbian tennis group that hosts the GLTA sanctioned The Gay and Lesbian Tennis Alliance Rose City Open every Labor Day weekend and provides various opportunities to meet and compete within the gay community
- Touch rugby. The Portland Touch Rugby team is a member of the US Federation of International Touch (USFIT)and has won the national championship several times, most recently in 2007 (Portland, Oregon), 2008 (Houston), and 2009 (Portland, Oregon). The team, the Portland Hunters, is home to a number of key members of the US National Touch team who have competed in the Touch Rugby International World Cup several times. There are also two other Touch Rugby teams in the Portland area, the Tigard, Oregon branch of Tumeke Touch and the Reed College Touch Rugby team
- Paintball. The Portland Naughty Dogs compete in the National Professional Paintball League in a variety of tournaments around the U.S.
- Mixed martial arts. Portland is also known as a hub for MMA. It's the site of Team Quest, a training camp founded by MMA legends such as Randy Couture, Dan Henderson, and Matt Lindland. Lindland was also founder and coach of the Portland Wolfpack, Portland's team in the now defunct International Fight League. Portland also is host to the semi-annual Sportfight events which frequently showcase the best up and coming fighters in the Pacific Northwest
- Electric hockey. Developed in northern Europe, electric hockey is a new sport designed specifically for power chair users. Providing opportunity for those experiencing disabilities, electric hockey utilizes a small and fast wooden cart and has game play similar to hockey. Local nonprofit Incight facilitates game play as part of their programming

== Defunct sports teams ==
=== Baseball ===
The Portland Beavers were a Triple-A baseball team from the Pacific Coast League affiliated with the San Diego Padres. The most recent franchise, which left after the 2010 season to become the Tucson Padres and is now known as the El Paso Chihuahuas, was founded in 2001, though the Beavers name dates to an early Portland baseball team established in 1903.

Baseball teams called the Beavers existed in Portland from 1903–1917 and again from 1919–1972 and 1978–1993, and finally from 2001–2010. In 1973, after the Beavers moved to Spokane, Washington, the Portland Mavericks came to town in the form of an independent Single-A team within the Northwest League. From 1973 to 1977 they played in what was then known as Civic Stadium. The Mavericks were owned by ex-minor league player and television actor Bing Russell. When Russell sold the team back to the Beavers in 1978 it was for $116,000, at the time a record amount for a minor league franchise. The most recent Beavers franchise also played at Civic Stadium. The original Beavers stadium was Vaughn Street Park located in northwest Portland. The Beavers won the Pacific Coast League Pennant the following years: 1906, 1910, 1911, 1913, 1914, 1932, 1936, 1945 and 1983. When the Beavers relocated to Salt Lake City in 1993, another Northwest League team, the Portland Rockies, moved in for the 1995 season, playing until 2000. When the Beavers returned for the 2001 season, the Rockies relocated to Pasco, Washington to become the Tri-City Dust Devils. The final version of the Beavers also played in Civic Stadium, renamed PGE Park upon their arrival. After the city announced plans to renovate PGE Park to a soccer-specific stadium for the Timbers, and a proposed park for the Beavers failed to materialize, the team moved to Tucson and then to El Paso.

=== Football ===
In 2013, it was announced that the Arena Football League (AFL) was expanding to Portland and the Portland Thunder was originally owned by Terry Emmert. The Thunder's first game occurred on March 17, 2014, against the San Jose SaberCats at Portland's Moda Center. Prior to the 2016 season, the AFL took over operations of the Thunder while looking for new local ownership. The team then changed its name to the Portland Steel for the 2016 AFL season. The team folded after the 2016 season.

Prior to the Portland Thunder/Steel, Portland had the Arena Football League team the Portland Forest Dragons. In years of 1997, 1998, and 1999, the Forest Dragons compiled records of 2–12, 4–10, and 7–7, never making the playoffs while in Portland. During the 1998 season the team featured receiver Oronde Gadsden, who won the league's Rookie of the Year award, and went on to sign with the NFL's Miami Dolphins.

=== Other defunct teams ===
The Portland Pride was established in 1992 as a founding member of the Continental Indoor Soccer League (CISL), which began play in 1993. The team played its home games in Portland's Memorial Coliseum. In 1997, the team and the league played its last season. The CISL folded and the Pride ownership moved the team to the Premier Soccer Alliance, where the team played under the name Portland Pythons.

- The Portland Power competed in the American Basketball League from 1996 to 1998
- The Portland Breakers competed in the United States Football League during the 1985 USFL season
- Portland had a team (Portland LumberJax) in the National Lacrosse League
- The Portland Storm and Portland Thunder competed in the World Football League in 1974 and 1975
- The original Portland Fire competed in the WNBA from 2000 through 2002
- The Portland Buckaroos competed in the (PCHL/NWHL) from 1928 to 1941, in the (WHL) from 1960 to 1975, and in the (WIHL) in 1975
- The Portland Rosebuds were two early professional hockey teams, one of which in 1916 was the first Stanley Cup Final participant from the United States

== Other venues, events, and activities ==
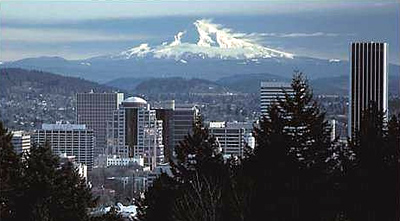
A view of downtown with Mount Hood in the background.

- Golf. The Portland Classic is a women's professional golf tournament in Portland, Oregon on the LPGA Tour. Founded 54 years ago in 1972, the annual event in the Portland area is the oldest continuous event on the LPGA Tour. The event is held at Columbia Edgewater Country Club and winners include 12 members of the World Golf Hall of Fame including: Nancy Lopez, Juli Inkster and Annika Sörenstam.
- Auto racing. Portland currently has the NTT Indycar Series, hosting the Grand Prix of Portland race at Portland International Raceway. PIR also hosts the Oregon Traill Rally of the American Rally Association and a variety of SCCA, historic, and annual races such as the Rose Cup during the city's Rose Festival. Washougal, Washington, directly across the Columbia River from Portland also hosts the Washougal MX, part of the Lucas Oil Pro Motocross Championship.
- Skiing and snowboarding are particularly popular with Portlanders. The area is served by a number of resorts located on nearby Mount Hood, including Timberline, which allows skiing year round. The only other resort in North America with summer skiing is Whistler in British Columbia.
- Rock climbing is growing in popularity as an outdoor pastime. At numerous small crags around town, one may glimpse mountaineers-in-training with their ropes, alpenstocks, and hard-soled boots practicing their technical moves on the rock in preparation for difficult alpine ascents.
- Running is a major important sport in the metropolitan area, the home of Nike and of Adidas' American operations. The Portland Marathon has been held annually in the city since 1971. The Hood to Coast Relay is the world's largest running relay race, with approximately 17,000 racers per year running from Timberline Lodge on Mount Hood to the Pacific Ocean at Seaside.
- Horse Racing. Horses ran at Portland Meadows until 2019.
- Velodrome. Amateur cycling has occurred weekly at the Alpenrose Velodrome since 1962.
- Cricket. Portland has its own cricket league called Oregon Cricket League (OCL) established 2005 that provides 2 formats of the game of cricket year around; T20, the 20 overs cricket league played in colored clothing, and the longer format of 30 overs league played in whites. Beaverton United Cricket Club is the reigning champion of the T20 league, winning it 3 times in a row from 2011. Northwest Cricket Club is the current champion of the 30-30 cricket league.
- Delta Dome, a proposed stadium in 1964

== See also ==
- LGBTQ culture in Portland, Oregon § Sports
- List of sports venues in Portland, Oregon
- Skateboarding in Portland, Oregon
