= Seattle Rugby Club =

US rugby union club, based in Seattle, WA

- Full name: Seattle Rugby Club
- Union: British Columbia Rugby Union
- Founded: 1966 (as Seattle RFC) & 1971 (as OPSB)
- Ground: Magnuson Park
- President: Kevin Flynn
- Coach: Justin Fitzpatrick
- League: Pacific Northwest Rugby Football Union
1st kit	2nd kit

Official website
- www.seattle.rugby

The Seattle Rugby Club (formerly Seattle Saracens and Old Puget Sound Beach after a merger) is a rugby union club based in Seattle. The club travels throughout the US and into Canada. In 2014 the club was ranked as the number one US club while also playing in a Canadian league based in British Columbia (BCRU). Old Puget Sound Beach was a charter member of the now defunct USA Super League in the Pacific Coast USA Rugby territory. Prior to the 2024-25 BC Premier League season, it was announced that Seattle would not compete, instead moving to the Pacific Northwest Rugby Football Union. The women's team would continue to compete in BC.

== History ==
Founded in 1966, Seattle RFC was a group of enthusiastic rugby players who had responded to an ad in the local Seattle Times looking to get a game of rugby going.

Old Puget Sound Beach Rugby Football Club played its first game in the fall of 1971.

In 1996, Seattle RFC joined with the local women's rugby club called the Breakers. This proved to be an opportunity for both men and women to prosper in the Pacific Northwest Rugby Football Union. The women's USA Division-1 team has consecutively been within the top 16, ‘Sweet 16’, in the nation and continues to play in the BCRU Premier League.

For decades, Seattle and OPSB were local adversaries and had many spirited matches. In 2006, Seattle RFC men's teams and OPSB's men's teams combined resources and were able to field a squad in the now defunct USA Rugby Super League as well as 2 squads in the BC Rugby Union's 1st and 2nd division in Canada.

=== Seattle–OPSB (2006–2014) ===
After years of mixed outcomes, the Super League teams reached the playoff rounds for 3 years in a row, and entered finals twice. The BCRU teams were also consistent in their respective divisions, reaching playoffs in most of their seasons. A combined 8 National Sevens titles, as well as winning the bowl in the 2014 World Club Sevens Championships, proved their abilities. With an mixture of enthusiastic players and coaching staff such as Waisale Serevi, Ben Gollings, and Justin Fitzpatrick, Seattle-OPSB took steps towards growing the rugby club in the Pacific Northwest.

=== Saracens (2014–2020) ===
In June 2014, Seattle-OPSB joined the Saracens Global Network, renaming themselves as Seattle Saracens. They were the ninth team to join the network, after VVA Saracens, São Paulo Saracens, Abu Dhabi Saracens, KL Saracens, Impala Saracens Nairobi, Timișoara Saracens and Toa Saracens. On May 9, 2015, the Seattle Saracens beat Meraloma Rugby 26–25 in the Division 1 final. As a result, they were promoted to the CDI Premier League.

=== Seattle Rugby Club (2020–present) ===
In 2018 after the Saracens partnership ended, the club board chose to return to their original orca art logo, but kept the name Seattle Saracens. Two years later, during the 2019-20 season, the entire club’s players, members, and coaching staff voted overwhelmingly to rebrand themselves. Officially changing their name to the Seattle Rugby Club in July 2020. Seattle left the BC Premier League prior to the 2024-25 season.
