= Chuckanut Bay RFC =

American rugby union team

- Union: USA Rugby Pacific Northwest Geographical Union Fraser Valley Rugby Union
- Nickname: Geoducks
- Founded: 1973
- Ground(s): deWilde Rugby & Polo Fields
- President: (United States) Kellen Wiggins
- Coach: (United States) Joel Weisser
Team kit

Official website
- www.chuckanut.rugby

The Chuckanut Bay Geoducks is a member of the Pacific Northwest Rugby Football Union and the Fraser Valley Rugby Union located in Bellingham, Washington.

== History ==
=== 1970s–1980s ===
The Chuckanut Bay Rugby Club was founded in 1973. Many of the founding fathers were former Western Washington University players. Due to graduation, and a variety of other factors, the majority of the membership of the Western club had become "non-students". Thus, the need arose for a club outside the university. Former students called a meeting and the group assembled at a small college house on Jersey Street in Bellingham, Washington. After a discussion, two names were suggested for the new club: the High-Street Commandos and the Chuckanut Bay Geoducks. Since the Geoduck is known as one of the most dangerous bivalves native to the Pacific Northwest waters, the choice was obvious. The founders thought it was also important to keep team colors that represented the Pacific Northwest. So, the colors Columbia Blue (a traditional hue from WWU) and orange, for the sunsets over Chuckanut Bay, were selected.

After formation of the club, the Geoducks became members of the Fraser Valley Rugby Union in British Columbia. In the second year of existence, the new team earned first division Union Champions and went all the way to the British Columbia first division semi finals. The Geoducks were also runners-up in the second division. The Club remained in the Union another year and finished close to the top but did not repeat as champions.

In 1976, the American and Canadian teams went their separate ways. The Canadians maintained the Fraser Valley Union and the American members formed the Western Washington Rugby Union, which is now part of the Pacific Northwest Rugby Football Union. In the second year of the new union, the Geoducks won the title for first division and won it again in 1984. The club achieved National recognition by winning the consolation championship at the 1980 Monterey National Tournament in Carmel, California. Over the years, the team has won tournament titles in Idaho, Oregon, California and Washington.

In 1977, Chuckanut hosted its first touring team when National Westminster Bank of London, England arrived. Through contacts made with Nat West, the club hosted the Pilgrim Fathers RFC of Torquay, England in the spring of 1979. With this foundation of tour-related friendships, Chuckanut undertook its first overseas tour to the British Isles in September 1980, winning three games and losing two. Again, in 1984, the Geoducks returned to England, Wales and Ireland, winning four games and losing two.

=== 2000s–present ===
A group of high school students took the initiative in 2000 to re start the U19 Steamers program. In the spring of 2000 they played in the Washington High School league. In September 2003, after a ten-year absence from league competition, the Men's team entered the Fraser Valley Rugby Union. The Geoducks experienced a winning season making it all the way to the British Columbia Rugby Union 3rd Division Championships. Under the guidance of coach Corky Foster, the club entered two men's teams, first and seconds, for the 2004 fall competition. Reorganization of the league structure for the spring 2005 season put the Geoducks back into Third Division. The 2006 season saw the club compete in the BCRU First and Second Division narrowly missing the provincial playoffs. The 2007 season saw the Geoducks playing in the BCRU 1st and 2nd Divisions.

Three members of the U19's were selected to the US National U19 squad in the 2006/07 year. Two others were invited to the U17 National camp. The Mini rugby program offered boys and girls ages 5–12 the opportunity to play.

== Current Teams ==
There are 11 different teams that make up the Chuckanut Bay RFC catering to a broad range of ages.

- Old Boys
- Senior Men - Geoducks
- Senior Women - Mussels
- High School Boys - Steamers
- High School Girls - Stingrays
- U-14
- U-12
- U-10
- U-8
- U-6

== Notable Members ==
United States International Rugby Capped Players
No.	Name	Position	Date of debut	Opposition	Competition	Venue	Ref.
1	Jeff Lombard	Flanker	May 21, 1977	Canada	Test match	Sports Complex; Burnaby	
2	Shawn Pittman	(Prop)	Nov 8, 2008	Uruguay	Test match	Rio Tinto Stadium; Sandy	
3	Nick Wallace	(Prop)	Jun 14, 2013	Tonga	2013 Pacific Nations Cup	Home Depot Center; Carson, California	
4	Titi Lamositele	(Prop)	Aug 17, 2013	Canada	2015 Rugby World Cup Qualifier	Blackbaud Stadium; Charleston	
5	Ben Broselle	(Wing 7s)	Mar 3, 2019	New Zealand	2018-19 World Rugby Sevens Series	Sam Boyd Stadium; Las Vegas	

== Pitch ==
Chuckanut's home field, the Bellingham Polo Club, provides two full size pitches, and a club house. The Club gained a Conditional Use Permit from Whatcom County to continue to play rugby at the venue.

== Tournaments ==
=== Can-Am 7s Tournament ===
The Can-Am 7's Tournament is North America's Elite seven-a-side rugby event.

In its 42nd consecutive year, the Can-Am 7's pits the top teams from Canada's strongest rugby province, British Columbia, with national championship caliber teams from the USA.

=== National Club 7s Tournament ===
Chuckanut hosted the 2006 & 2007 USA National Club 7s Tournament.
