= Portland Power =

Portland Power may refer to:

- Portland Power (basketball) (1996–1998), a women's basketball team, Portland, Oregon
- Portland Power (Australian rules football), an Australian rules football team, Portland, Oregon
