= Dragon boat racing in Portland, Oregon =

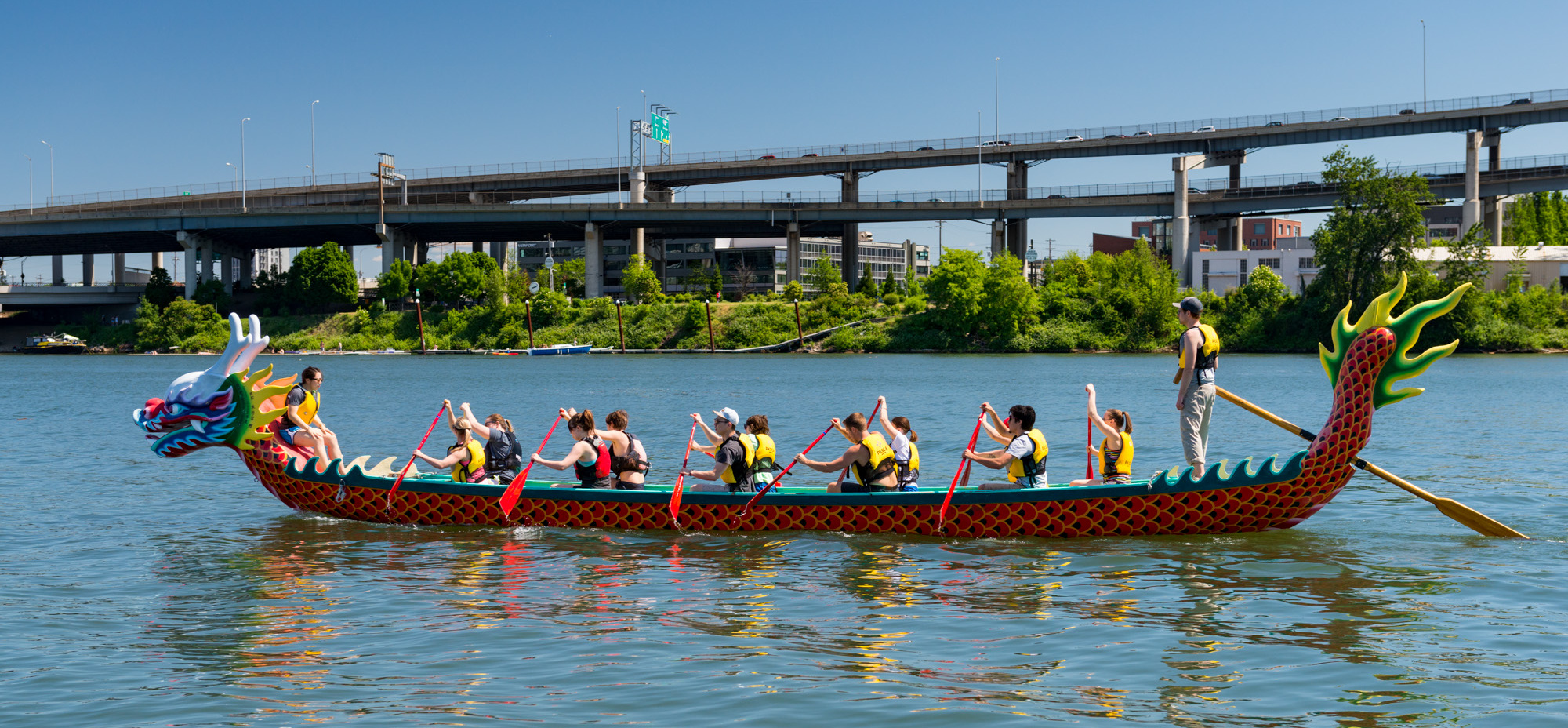
Dragon boat, Willamette River, 2016

Dragon boat racing is popular in the American city of Portland, Oregon.

Dragon boats have been stored at the Portland Boathouse, which opened in 2004 and has been described as a "warehouse-like space".

In 2024, dragon boat racers asked the Multnomah County Board of Commissioners to make waterways safer after motorboats caused a series of capsizes.

St. Mary's Academy has a dragon boat racing team.

== Events ==
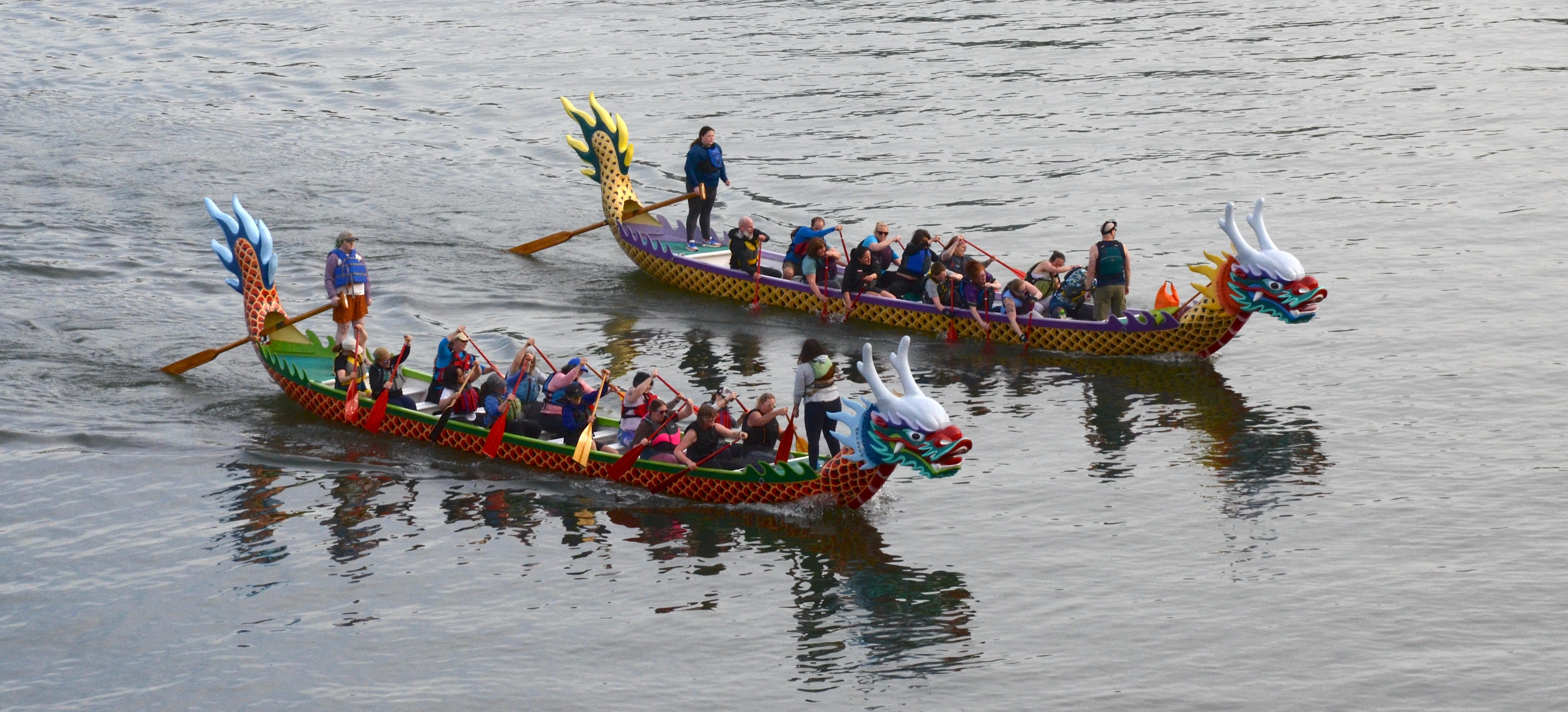
Two dragon boats racing during a practice on the Willamette River just south of the Hawthorne Bridge, 2022

The city has two annual dragon boat races. One occurs as part of the Portland Rose Festival and the other is the Portland Dragon Boat Festival.

=== Portland Rose Festival ===
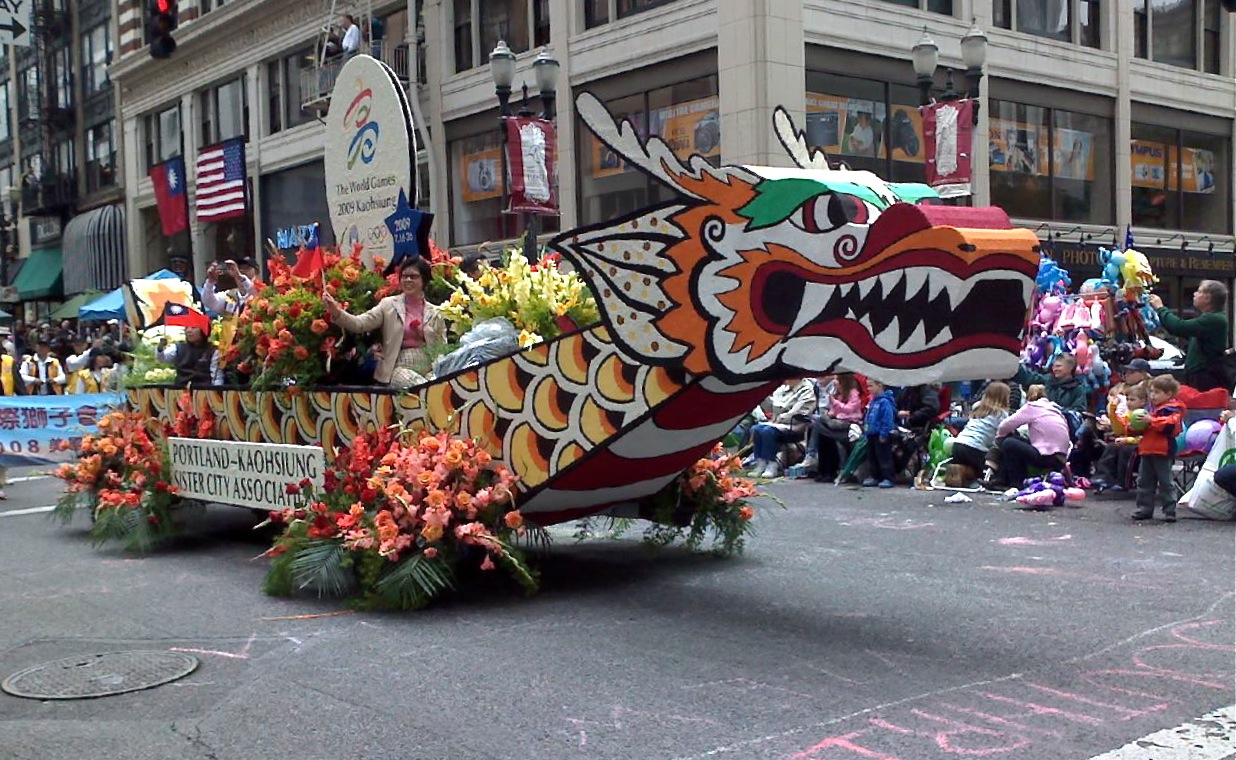
Dragon boat in the Portland Rose Festival's Grand Floral Parade, 2008

For approximately 20 years, dragon boat races have occurred in conjunction with the Portland Rose Festival in the Willamette River, along Tom McCall Waterfront Park. The event has been called the Portland-Kaohsiung Sister City Association Dragon Boat Races. Oregon Public Broadcasting has said the races are among the festival's most established activities.

The book Oregon Trivia says the races became associated with the festival in 1988. Dragon boat racing director Tom Crowder said the races started in 1989, after sister city Kaohsiung gifted Portland a few dragon boats. The fleet continued to grow in size since then.

85 and 71 teams registered to participate in 2011 and 2014, respectively. Approximately 60 and 64 teams participated in 2015 and 2016, respectively. Approximately 100 teams competed over two days in 2017. The event was cancelled in 2020 because of the COVID-19 pandemic, then returned in 2021. Approximately 50 local teams participated in the 2024 event.

In 2025, some members of Portland City Council joined a team ahead of the Portland Rose Festival, which saw approximately 60 teams participate in total. There is also an annual "Awakening of the Dragons" ceremony. The ceremony has involved a Portland Fire & Rescue boat using a water cannon.

=== Portland Dragon Boat Festival ===
The Portland Dragon Boat Festival celebrated its 25th anniversary in 2023, when approximately 40 teams participated. It is hosted by DragonSports USA Portland. The 2025 event saw 41 teams participating in races in the Willamette River, along Tom McCall Waterfront Park. Metro Parks and Nature distributed free personal flotation devices at the event. The festival has also featured a beer garden, food vendors, and activities such as face painting.

== See also ==
- Culture of Portland, Oregon
- Sports in Portland, Oregon
