= Pacific Northwest Rugby Football Union =

American rugby union

Pacific Northwest Rugby Union
- Union: USA Rugby; Pacific Northwest Geographical Union
- President: (United States) Vincent Spagnolo

Official website
- pacificnorthwest.rugby

The Pacific Northwest Rugby Football Union is the Local Area Union (LAU) for rugby union teams in Idaho, Oregon, and Washington under the Pacific Northwest Geographical Union of USA Rugby.

== Men's Premiership Clubs ==
Division I

- Boise United
- Seattle Orcas

Division II

- Eastside Tsunami
- ORSU Jesters
- Portland Pigs
- Tacoma Nomads
- Valley Kangaroos

== Men's Championship Clubs ==
- Bend Roughriders
- Budd Bay Buffalos
- Chuckanut Geoducks
- Clark County Chiefs
- Eastside Axemen
- Portland Lumberjacks
- Seattle Quake
- Seattle Rhinos

== Men's Challenger Clubs ==
- Eugene Stags
- Kitsap Renegades
- Salem Spartans
- Seattle Quake
- Spokane

== Women's Premiership Clubs ==
- Bend Roughriders
- Boise United
- Budd Bay Bandits
- Chuckanut Mussels
- Deschutes Crows
- Emerald City Mudhens
- Eugene Reign
- Federal Way Lady Warriors
- ORSU Jesters
- Portland Pigs
- Salem Attack Owls
- Seattle Orcas
- Skagit Valley Steelheads
- Spokane Phoenix
- Tacoma Sirens

== Championships ==
DII Men's
Year	Final		
Year	Winner	Score	Runner-up
2021-2022	Eastside Tsunami	21-8	Boise United
2022-2023	Boise United	38-27	Eastside Tsunami
2023-2024	Boise United	57-19	Valley Kangaroos
2024-2025	Boise United	28-7	Eastside Tsunami
2025-2026	Eastside Tsunami	40-16	Valley Kangaroos

DIII Men's
Year	Final		
Year	Winner	Score	Runner-up
2021-2023	Not held		
2022-2023	Bend Roughriders	36-22	Clark County
2023-2024	Clark County	N/A	Bend Roughriders
2024-2025	Portland Pigs	39-27	Snohomish County Rhinos
2025-2026	Portland Pigs Men	45-29	Clark County

DI Women's
Year	Final		
Year	Winner	Score	Runner-up
2021-2023	Not held		
2022-2023	Seattle	37-0	ORSU
2023-2024	Seattle	60-0	ORSU
2024-2026	Not held		

DII Women's
Year	Final		
Year	Winner	Score	Runner-up
2021-2023	Not held		
2022-2023	Portland Pigs	45-10	Salem Attack Owls
2023-2024	Portland Pigs	47-14	Emerald City Mudhens
2024-2025	Portland Pigs	55-10	Emerald City Mudhens
2025-2026	Portland Pigs	Forfeit	Bend Lady Roughriders

== Hall of Fame ==
PNW Rugby Hall of Fame
No.	Inductee	Type	Year Inducted	Ref.
1	Cleve Larson	Player	2023	
2	Dick Smith	Builder	2023	
3	Jeff Lombard	Player	2023	
4	Kevin Flynn	Builder	2023	
5	Liz Kirk	Player	2023	
6	ORSU Women's DI National Champions 2014	Team	2023	
7	Seattle Seawolves MLR Champions 2018	Team	2023	
8	Shannon Nielson	Builder	2023	

== See also ==
- Pacific Northwest Geographical Union
- USA Rugby
- Rugby union in the United States
