= Portland Rugby Football Club =

Portland Rugby Football Club may refer to:

- Portland Rugby Football Club (Maine)
- Portland Rugby Football Club (Oregon)
