= Bend Rugby Club =

Oregon rugby union

- Full name: Bend Rugby Club
- Union: USA Rugby; Pacific Northwest Rugby Football Union
- Founded: 1975; 51 years ago
- Location: Bend, OR
- Coach: Mike Abbot
Team kit

Official website
- www.bendrugby.org

The Bend Rugby Club is a US rugby union club established in Bend, Oregon in 1975 and is a non-profit organization. Bend Rugby is a member of USA Rugby and competes in the Pacific Northwest Rugby Football Union.

Notable wins by the club include the Bend Roughriders winning the Division title against Boise in 2018, the Lady Roughriders winning the PNRFU Championship in 2016, and the Bend Blues winning the Rugby Oregon Championship in 2026.

They also provide summer youth rugby camps with the Bend Parks and Recreation Department.

== History ==
The team was founded in 1975 by Keith Erikson and John Jeans. The team began as a group of ex-football players and ski enthusiasts. In 1977, Bend Rugby joined the Pacific Northwest Rugby Football Union (PNRFU). Since then, Bend has won multiple league championships and appeared in several national tournaments.

== Teams ==
- Bend Roughriders; men's team
- Bend Lady Roughriders; women+ team
- Bend Blues; youth team

== Tournaments ==
=== Cascade Classic ===
The Cascade Classic is a preseason tournament hosted in Bend, Oregon. It is a social tournament with club teams from across the PNW and West Coast. The Bend Roughriders have hosted the tournament for over 20 years.
