= Portland Rugby Football Club (Oregon) =

(United States) Portland
- Full name: Portland Rugby Football Club
- Union: USA Rugby; Pacific Northwest RFU
- Nickname: Pigs
- Founded: 1961; 65 years ago
Men's DII kit	Men's DIII kit	Women's DII kit

Official website
- www.portlandrugby.org

The Portland Rugby Football Club (PRFC) is a US rugby union club established in Portland, Oregon in 1961 and is a non-profit organization. PRFC is a member of USA Rugby and competes in the Pacific Northwest Rugby Football Union.

Portland Rugby won the 2011 PNRFU Championship and placed 9th nationally at the USA Rugby Men's Division II Sweet 16s in Chula Vista, CA.

In its 50+ years of existence, the PRFC has promoted the sport of rugby through competition as well as fundraising and charitable contributions. Portland Rugby has participated in 3 international tours.

The PRFC is open to adult males and females of all experience levels.

== Current Teams ==
PRFC now includes a men's Senior Division II team and a men's Senior Division III teams, both known as the "Pigs", and an 'old boys' side made up of players age 35 and older, known as the "Old Boars." It is also now home to a women's Senior Division II club.

== Notable Members ==
United States International Rugby Capped Players
No.	Name	Position	Date of debut	Opposition	Competition	Venue	Ref.
1	Lauryn Carlton	Prop	October 24, 2026	Italy	WXV Global Series	Geodis Park, Nashville	

== Pitch ==
After a 2011 agreement which saw the installation of professional rugby posts at the new pitch, Portland Parks and Recreation allowed the PRFC to play its home matches at Northgate Park in Portland, OR until April 11, 2026 due to construction of a new Aquatics Center in 2027. Matches were relocated to Delta Park Field #9, based on feedback from survey conducted by Portland Parks and Recreation. Practices are generally held at Montavilla Park on NE 82nd Ave.
