= Delta Dome =

Proposed sports venue in Portland, Oregon

Delta Dome (unbuilt)
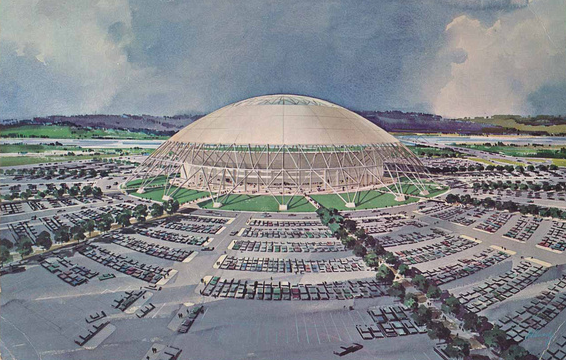
- Location: Delta Park, Portland, Oregon, U.S.
- Capacity: 46,000 (expandable to 80,000)
- Surface: artificial

Construction
- Groundbreaking: 1964 (designed)
- Built: never built
- Opened: 1968 (planned)
- Cost: $25 million (estimate)

Delta Dome was a proposed indoor sports venue in Portland, Oregon. Plans for the domed stadium were proposed in 1963. It would have had at least 46,000 seats with plexi-glass skylights and a 17,000 vehicle parking lot. Inspiration for the building's architecture came from the Harris County Domed Stadium (now known as the Astrodome) in Houston, Texas, which was under construction at the time.

Delta Dome was to be built in Delta Park, the location of Vanport City, a housing project for workers during World War II that was destroyed in a 1948 flood, after a Columbia River dike failed.

The enclosed stadium was intended to attract a major professional sports franchise and increase the city's odds if they were to bid to host an Olympic Games.

Plans for the Delta Dome were scrapped after voters rejected two bond measures in 1964 to fund the construction. Delta Dome had the support of Governor Mark Hatfield and Portland Mayor Terry Schrunk. When the city purchased Multnomah Stadium, now known as Providence Park, the push for a new municipally owned multi-sports facility ended.

== History ==
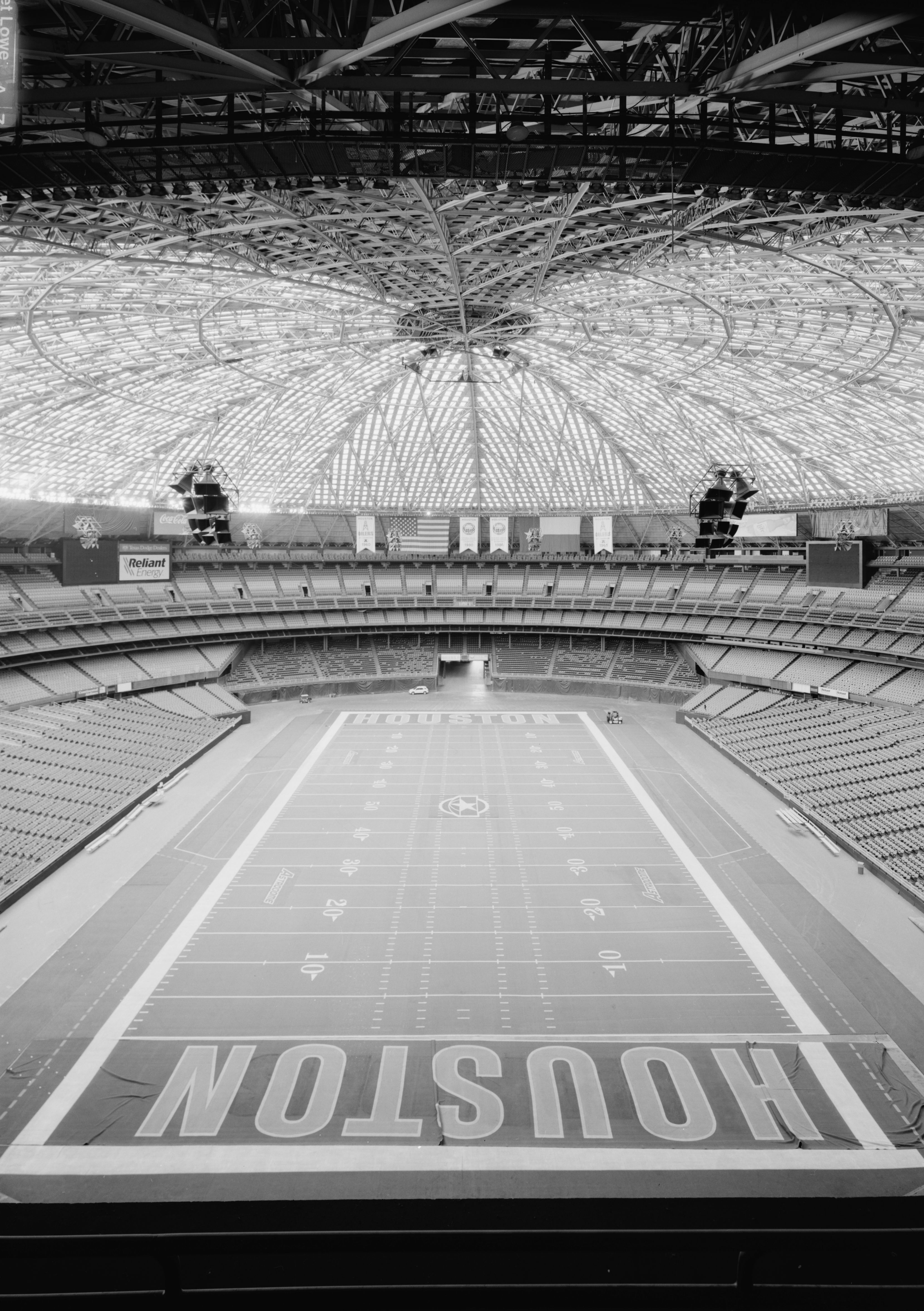
Designers of the Delta Dome borrowed ideas used at Harris County Domed Stadium in Houston, Texas which was being built at the time.

The idea for a stadium at Delta Park in Portland, Oregon, was started by a development group in the summer of 1963. They looked at building a domed stadium, similar to the Harris County Domed Stadium in Houston, Texas, which was under construction at the time. Plans for the Delta Dome called for a 46,000 seat capacity that could be expanded to 80,000, or possibly 100,000. Also included were plans for a 17,000 vehicle parking lot. Architects said the ceiling of the dome would be made from plexi-glass, which would add natural light. The skylights, which could be opened, were intended to add an open-air feel to the building. It was scheduled to be completed by 1968. It was estimated to cost US$25 million (US$259.5 million adjusted for inflation).

Measure 2 was on the ballot during Portland's primary election in 1964, which if approved, would fund the construction of the Delta Dome. The measure was rejected by voters, with 101,324 no votes to 91,961 yes. The Multnomah County Board of Commissioners denied the proposed bond in July 1964. The Portland City Council followed suit by rejecting supporters request (by a 4–1 vote) to put it up for a second city-wide vote during a council meeting on August 5, 1964. In August, Governor Mark Hatfield convinced Multnomah County Commissioner David Eccles to change his vote in favor of placing the bond on the general election ballot. In the county-wide contest, it was defeated with 102,281 people voting in its favor and 113,832 voting against.

In March 1965, a bill was introduced into the state legislature to fund the Delta Dome by imposing a three percent tax on hotels and other forms of lodgings to out-of-state residents. However in November 1965, the City of Portland purchased Multnomah Stadium from the Multnomah Athletic Club, putting to rest the city's need for a multi-sports facility.

=== Opposition ===
The bond measures ultimately failed, due in part to voters not believing Portland could attract or sustain a major sports franchise. The Oregonian noted that the Veterans Memorial Coliseum, which opened five years before, was hemorrhaging money without a permanent tenant. Another issue raised was the traffic on Interstate 5, which opponents said would get worse if the stadium was erected. Opposition also grew around potential tax increases. Worries of flood damage was another concern, since it was in the area that flooded two decades prior.

=== Supporters ===
The group funding advertisements in favor of the bond measure were known as "Volunteers for Delta Dome". Robert Richett was their chairman.

One of the biggest attractions of the stadium was that it was enclosed, so games would not have to be canceled due to inclement weather. A scale model of the stadium was unveiled in October 1964 where supporters sang a song entitled "New Delta Stadium, Where it Never Rains".

Supporters of the stadium claimed that building a second stadium in Portland would make bids on behalf of the city to the International Olympic Committee to host an Olympic Games more feasible. A consulting firm conducted a study which predicted a $800,000 profit for the tax base. Opponents of the bond criticized the study because it assumed Portland would attract several large events when the stadium opened, which they contended should not be assumed.

Shortly before the county voted on the bond measure, pro-Delta Dome leaflets were mistakenly included with material that attacked President Lyndon Johnson's re-election campaign.

After it was voted down in November 1964, there was speculation that the Delta Dome would form a corporation and issue stock for citizens to buy, but the idea never materialized.

Politicians

- Vic Atiyeh, future Governor of Oregon
- Donald G. Drake, chairman of the Port of Portland
- David A. Johnson, Portland Police Bureau Chief of Police
- M. J. Frey, publisher of The Oregonian
- Mark Hatfield, Governor of Oregon
- Robert D. Holmes, former Governor of Oregon
- Rudolph Luepke, Mayor of Vancouver, Washington
- Tom McCall, future Governor of Oregon
- Wayne L. Morse, Senator for Oregon at the time
- Terry Schrunk, Mayor of Portland

Organizations

- American Institute of Architects (Portland chapter)
- East Side Commercial Club
- Gresham Area Chamber of Commerce
- Oregon Sports Writers and Broadcasters
- Portland Chamber of Commerce
- Portland Junior Chamber of Commerce
- St. Johns Boosters

== Quotes ==
Delta Dome will be the largest covered stadium in the world, Oregon's big landmark of distinction like the Eiffel Tower, the Empire State Building, the Golden Gate Bridge and the Space Needle. Delta Dome will be our international symbol of progress, a year-round, weatherproof, family fun center servicing three million people a year.

— Volunteers for Delta Dome, The Oregonian, 25 April 1964

The Delta Dome covered stadium is the best investment ever offered [sic] any community [...] We would bring thousands of tourists just to see such a stadium, and thousands more from nearby states to see events.

— Robert D. Holmes, The Oregonian, 27 October 1964

Do not be fooled by the last minute snowstorm of propaganda. Delta Dome is an extravagant gamble which will cause higher taxes for thirty years.

— Citizens Against Delta Dome, The Oregonian, 30 October 1964

I have no doubt that an NFL franchise would have been a [big] hit in Portland if the 1964 'Delta Dome' $25 million bond measure had not narrowly failed. The Delta Dome was a 45,000-seat baseball-football complex proposed in an era when the NFL and MLB were expanding. Now, we would need a publicly funded stadium. We would need an owner. We would need an opportunity from the league. A pipe dream, basically. And if it never happens, it's a shame.

— John Canzano, The Oregonian, 28 January 2012

== See also ==
- List of sports venues in Portland, Oregon
- Kingdome, a similar design built in Seattle, Washington in 1976
- Portland Beavers Ballpark, another unbuilt stadium in Portland
