= Portland Beavers Ballpark =

Stadium in Portland, Oregon

Portland Beavers Ballpark (unbuilt)
- Location: Portland, Oregon
- Capacity: ~10,000

Construction
- Opened: Abandoned 2010

Tenant
- Portland Beavers (PCL)

Portland Beavers Ballpark was a description of a new stadium in Portland, Oregon, or in an outlying city that was being planned for the Portland Beavers of the Pacific Coast League of Minor League Baseball. The ballpark idea was abandoned in October 2010, with no location ever determined for it; several locations were rejected due to public criticism.

== Background ==
Until 2010, the Beavers played in PGE Park, now Providence Park and shared it with the Portland State Vikings college football team and the Portland Timbers soccer team, which played in the USL First Division, the second division of American soccer.

In 2009, the city of Portland was awarded a Major League Soccer (MLS) expansion franchise for 2011, also to be named the Portland Timbers. Due to MLS requirements about the playing surface, seating configuration, and scheduling, PGE Park was to be renovated as a soccer- and football-only stadium and a new stadium was to be built for the Beavers. Merritt Paulson, whose Shortstop LLC organization owned both the Timbers and the Beavers, estimated that a new baseball stadium with a capacity of 8,000 to 12,000 seats, along with the renovation of PGE Park for MLS, would cost about $85 million.

On February 3, 2010, the Portland City Council approved a $31 million agreement with Beavers' and Timbers' owner Merritt Paulson to renovate PGE Park, meaning that the Beavers had to find a new place to play their home games by 2011.

== Location ==
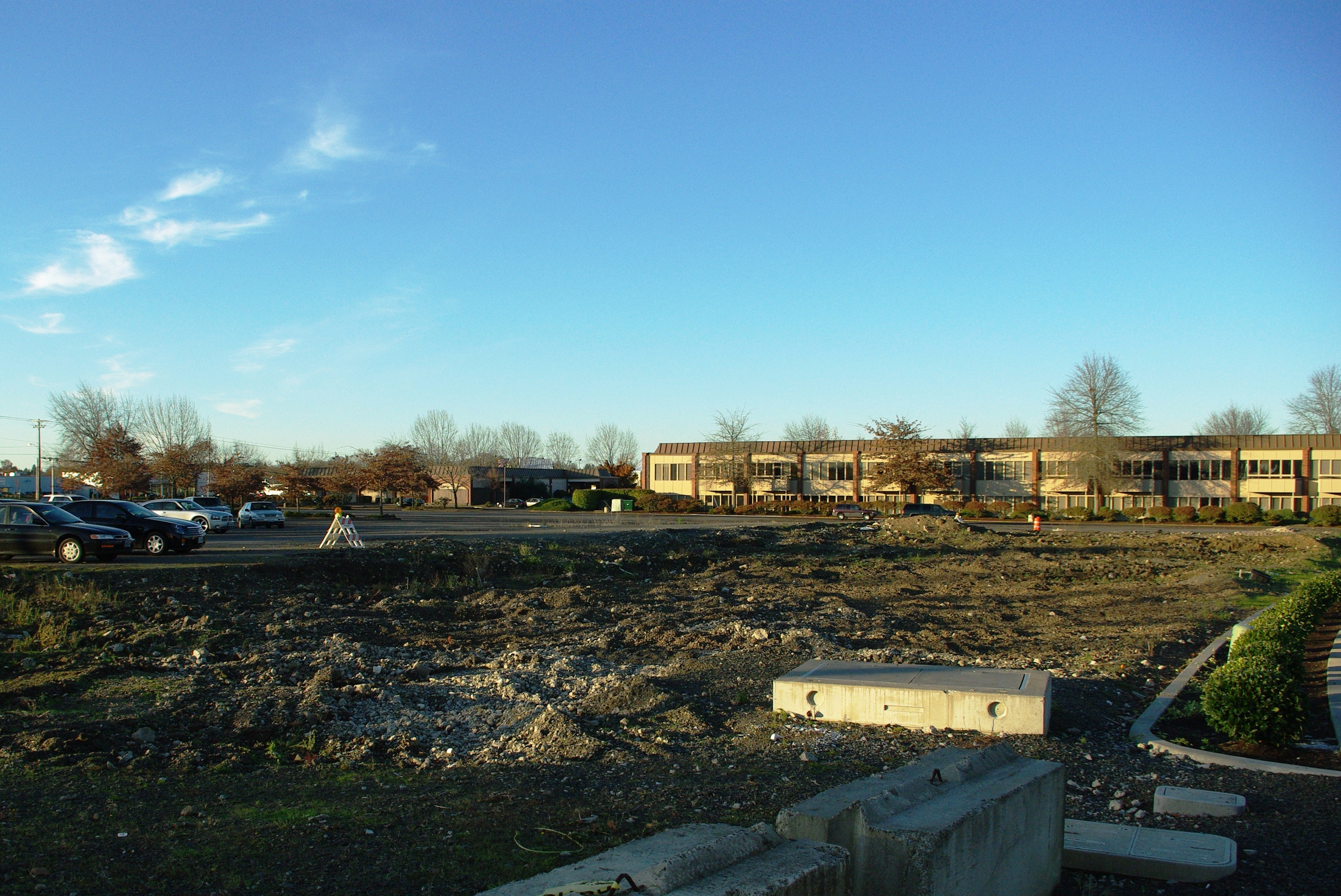
Former Westgate Theater site in Beaverton

In the initial proposal, funding for the new soccer team was dependent on a replacement Beavers stadium being found in Portland. Initially, the ballpark was to be built at the site currently occupied by the Memorial Coliseum, which would have been torn down. But public outcry about demolishing a Portland landmark led Portland mayor Sam Adams to propose a second site in the Rose Quarter area north of Memorial Coliseum, which proved to be too small.

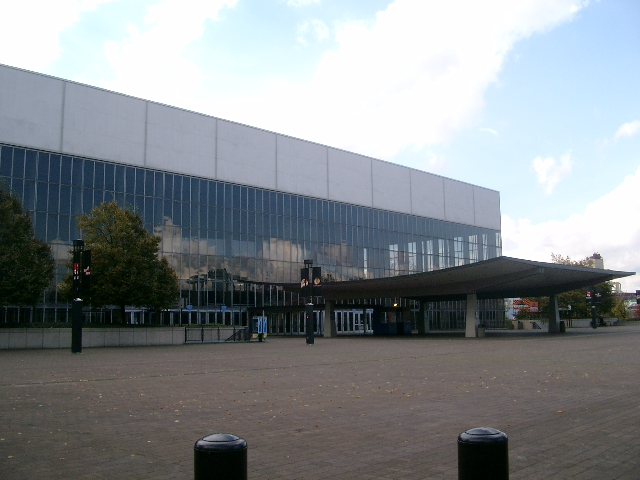
The Memorial Coliseum in the Rose Quarter was an original site for the ballpark, however, it met much public criticism.

Attention then turned to a third site, Lents Park in the Lents neighborhood in southeast Portland, which had been considered in the early planning stages but rejected due to less-accessible location. After a series of contentious public hearings in which neighbors objected to construction of the stadium in a city park, the Lents site was removed from consideration.

On June 24, the Portland City Council voted to separate the soccer and baseball projects, allowing renovation of PGE Park to proceed without completed plans for a baseball stadium in place. Other locations that were considered included a vacant terminal at the Port of Portland, Delta Park, the Portland Expo Center, Portland Meadows, the Westwood Corporation Heliport site, and a building owned by Portland Public Schools near the Rose Quarter.

Other locations outside the Portland city limits were also under consideration. In Beaverton, preliminary plans included building the park next to the Beaverton Central MAX station. Clackamas County promoted a location near the Southeast Fuller Road station on the recently completed MAX Green Line light rail, and Vancouver mayor Tim Leavitt indicated interest in bringing the team to his city. None of these proposals gained enough momentum to proceed to the planning stage.

== Abandonment of project ==
Unable to find either a suitable site, public support, or a source of funding, and with time running out before the start of the next season, Paulson sold the Beavers in October 2010. The new owners, the San Diego Padres, found a home for the team, renamed to the Tucson Padres, in Tucson, Arizona until the 2013 season, when it was planned that they would move to a new stadium in Escondido, California, a San Diego suburb. After those stadium plans were placed on indefinite hold, the team remained in Tucson for the 2013 season and moved to El Paso as the El Paso Chihuahuas for the 2014 season.

The Portland area was without minor league baseball in 2011 and 2012. After the 2012 season, the NWL Yakima Bears relocated to a new 4,500-seat stadium in the northwest suburb of Hillsboro and became the Hillsboro Hops.

== See also ==
- Delta Dome
- List of sports venues in Portland, Oregon
