= Veterans Memorial Coliseum (Portland, Oregon) =

Multi-use indoor arena in Portland, Oregon

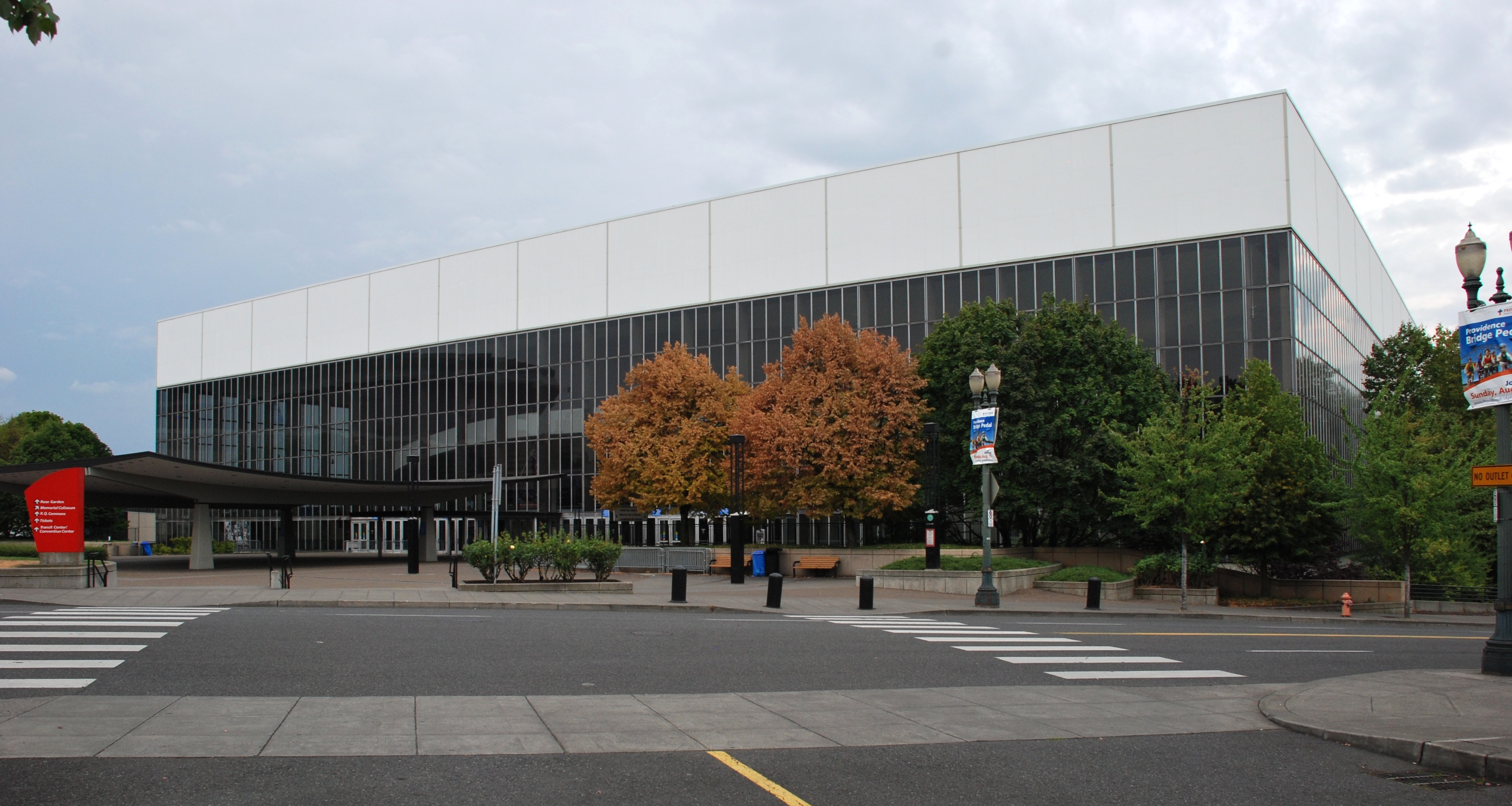
- Exterior view of the arena (c.2013)

- Location within Oregon Location within the United States
- Former names: Memorial Coliseum (1960–2011)
- Address: 300 N Ramsay Way; Portland, Oregon
- Location: Lloyd District
- Coordinates: 45°31′56″N 122°40′10″W
- Owner: City of Portland
- Operator: Rip City Management
- Capacity: 12,000 (reduced to 10,000 with 2025 renovations)
- Public transit: MAX Light Rail at Rose Quarter Transit Center at Interstate/Rose Quarter; Bus Service; 4, 8, 17, 35, 44, 77

Construction
- Groundbreaking: February 4, 1959
- Opened: November 3, 1960
- Cost: $8 million ($88.4 million in 2025 dollars)
- Architect: Skidmore, Owings & Merrill
- Structural engineers: Moffat, Nichol and Taylor
- General contractor: Hoffman Construction

Tenants
- Portland Winterhawks (WHL) (1976–present); Portland Buckaroos (WHL) (1960–1974); Portland Pilots (WCAC) (1960–1984); Portland Trail Blazers (NBA) (1970–1995); Portland Timbers (NASL) (1979–1982); Portland Pride (CISL) (1993–1997); Portland Power (ABL) (1996–1998); Portland Prowlers (IPFL) (2000)

Website
- www.rosequarter.com/about-us/our-venues
- Memorial Coliseum
- U.S. National Register of Historic Places
- Area: approx. 7.24 acres (2.93 ha)
- Built: 1960
- Architectural style: International style
- NRHP reference No.: 09000707
- Added to NRHP: September 10, 2009

The Veterans Memorial Coliseum (originally known as the Memorial Coliseum) is an indoor arena located in the oldest part of the Rose Quarter area in Portland, Oregon. The arena is the home of the Portland Winterhawks, a major junior ice hockey team, and was the original home of the Portland Trail Blazers of the National Basketball Association. It has been included on the National Register of Historic Places in recognition of its architectural significance.

== Tenants ==
From 1960 to 1974 the Memorial Coliseum was the home of the Portland Buckaroos of the Western Hockey League, and it was the venue for the Final Four of the NCAA basketball tournament in March 1965, where UCLA won its second of ten such championships in the 1960s and 1970s.

=== Portland Trail Blazers ===
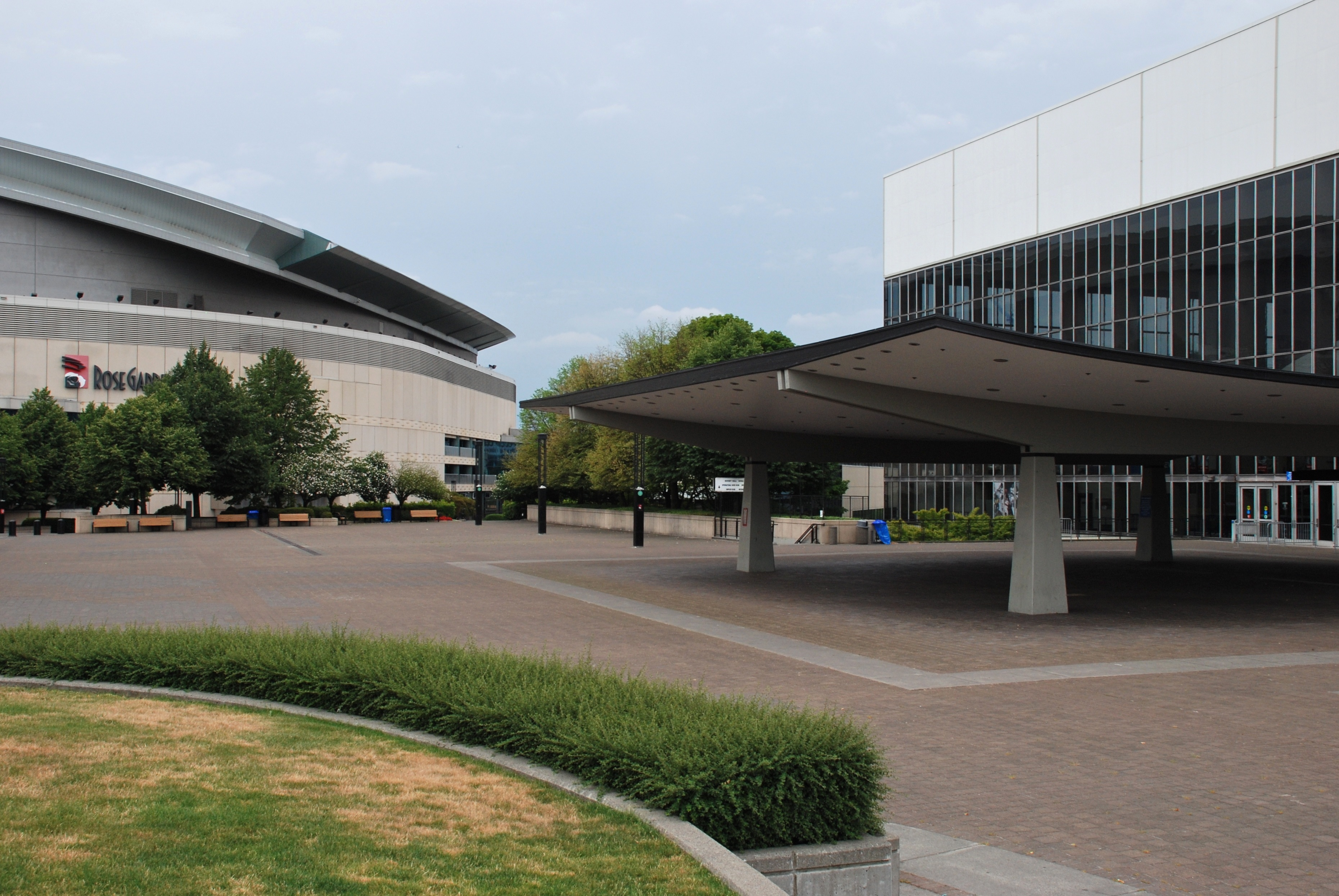
The Moda Center (left) replaced the Coliseum as the home of the Portland Trail Blazers in 1995.

When the Portland Trail Blazers franchise was awarded in 1970, the Memorial Coliseum became the team's home court, capable of seating 12,666 when configured for basketball. Three NBA Finals have been played in the Coliseum; in 1977 (when the Trail Blazers won) and in 1990 and 1992. The Blazers were 10–0 in the Coliseum during the 1977 playoffs, including the clincher in Game 6 of the Finals. The Detroit Pistons were the only visiting team to win the championship at the Coliseum, claiming their second consecutive championship in Game 5 of the 1990 Finals.

In 1974, Gerald Ford became the first president of the United States to attend an NBA game. On November 1 at Memorial Coliseum, he arrived in the third quarter and watched the Trail Blazers defeat the Buffalo Braves, 113–106.

Construction began on the nearby Rose Garden Arena (now Moda Center) soon after the 1992 NBA Finals, and it became the team's home arena when it opened in 1995.

As part of the team's 40th anniversary celebration, the Blazers played a pre-season game at Memorial Coliseum on October 14, 2009, against the Phoenix Suns. Team founder Harry Glickman, former players Jerome Kersey, Terry Porter, and Bob Gross, as well as broadcaster Bill Schonely attended the game. The Suns defeated the Blazers, 110–104, with 11,740 tickets sold.

In 2019, the Portland Trail Blazers celebrated their 50th season anniversary of becoming an NBA franchise. The organization played their first preseason game of the 2019–2020 season at the Memorial Coliseum on October 8, against the Denver Nuggets as a tribute to the stadium that the Trail Blazers called home for 25 years.

=== Portland Winterhawks ===
The building is currently the home arena of the Portland Winterhawks of the Western Hockey League, which used to split its schedule with the Moda Center prior to 2021. In August 2007, the City of Portland and the Portland Winterhawks reached an agreement to have replay screens installed in the main center ice scoreboard in time for the 2007–2008 hockey season. The city agreed to rent the screens, which are owned by the Winterhawks, for the first year, and then either buy them outright or replace them with different screens in 2008–09. Other improvements included adding a beer garden area, replacing graphic displays, and general painting and repairs.

Prior to the start of the 2021-22 WHL season, the Winterhawks announced they will be playing at Veterans Memorial Coliseum full-time.

=== Other occupants ===
The original Portland Timbers of the NASL played indoor soccer at the coliseum from 1979 to 1982. The Portland Power of the American Basketball League played in the Coliseum from 1996 to 1998. It hosted the OSAA 4A Men's State Basketball Tournament in March 1966 – 2003 and the March 2005 Big Sky Conference Basketball Tournament. The Memorial Coliseum hosts the Oregon High School Hockey League; local high school ice hockey teams play a few games each season and it also hosts some other events such as conventions, touring shows, and high school graduations. The Memorial Coliseum also has hosted the OSAA High School Dance and Drill team State Championships. It has also hosted the FIRST Robotics Competition Pacific Northwest district championship event every other year, most recently in 2024.

== Major events ==
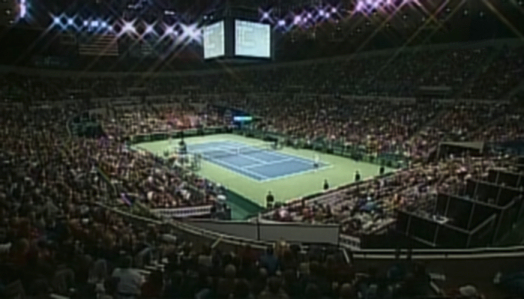
The interior during the Davis Cup in 2007

The Memorial Coliseum was designed with large doors at both ends to accommodate the floats of the Portland Rose Festival's Grand Floral Parade. The 4.2-mile-long (6.8 km) parade traditionally has begun at the Memorial Coliseum, where paying guests watch the parade cross the Coliseum's floor from reserved seats inside and from bleachers outside. In 2025, the parade did not utilize the building. The Rose Festival Queen's coronation has also been held in the facility since 1961.

On August 22, 1965, The Beatles played two shows at Memorial Coliseum to 20,000 screaming fans as part of their 1965 American Tour. Allen Ginsberg, who was in the audience, wrote a poem about the event called "Portland Coliseum". Led Zeppelin performed at the Coliseum on May 7, 1969, during their second North American concert tour and returned during their fifth and eighth tours in 1970 and 1972, respectively. The Monkees performed at the coliseum on August 26, 1967.

Elvis Presley performed at Memorial Coliseum on November 11, 1970, April 27, 1973, And Again on November 26, 1976, in front of 12,000 13,000 and 11,000 fans, respectively. The Bee Gees performed two sold-out concerts on July 17 and 18, 1979, as part of their successful Spirits Having Flown Tour.

The Grateful Dead have played at the Memorial Coliseum on five occasions between June 1973 and August 1983, with their shows on June 24, 1973, and May 19, 1974, recorded for the box set Pacific Northwest '73–'74: The Complete Recordings.

Bon Jovi played at the Memorial Coliseum for two consecutive nights as part of their New Jersey Syndicate Tour. During these shows on May 8, 1989, and May 9, 1989, the band recorded most of the footage for their music video Lay Your Hands On Me.

A political rally for 2000 presidential candidate Ralph Nader sold 10,500 $7-tickets at the venue on August 26, 2000, with every seat sold except those behind the stage. President Barack Obama spoke at the Memorial Coliseum on March 21, 2008, before winning the Democratic Nomination.

=== Dew Tour ===
In 2004, Portland was selected as one of five cities in the U.S. to host the Dew Tour, an extreme sports franchise started in 2005. Titled the Vans Invitational, the event was held at the Rose Quarter August 17–21, 2005. The Memorial Coliseum hosted BMX: Park, BMX: Vert, Skateboard: Park, and Skateboard: Vert. The Dew Tour returned to the Rose Quarter again with the Wendy's Invitational on August 12–15, 2010, marking the tour's sixth year in Portland, which is the only city that has qualified to host the tour in every year since its inception.

=== Davis Cup Tennis final ===
From November 30 through December 2, 2007, the Memorial Coliseum hosted the 2007 Davis Cup Tennis final between the USA and Russia.

== History ==
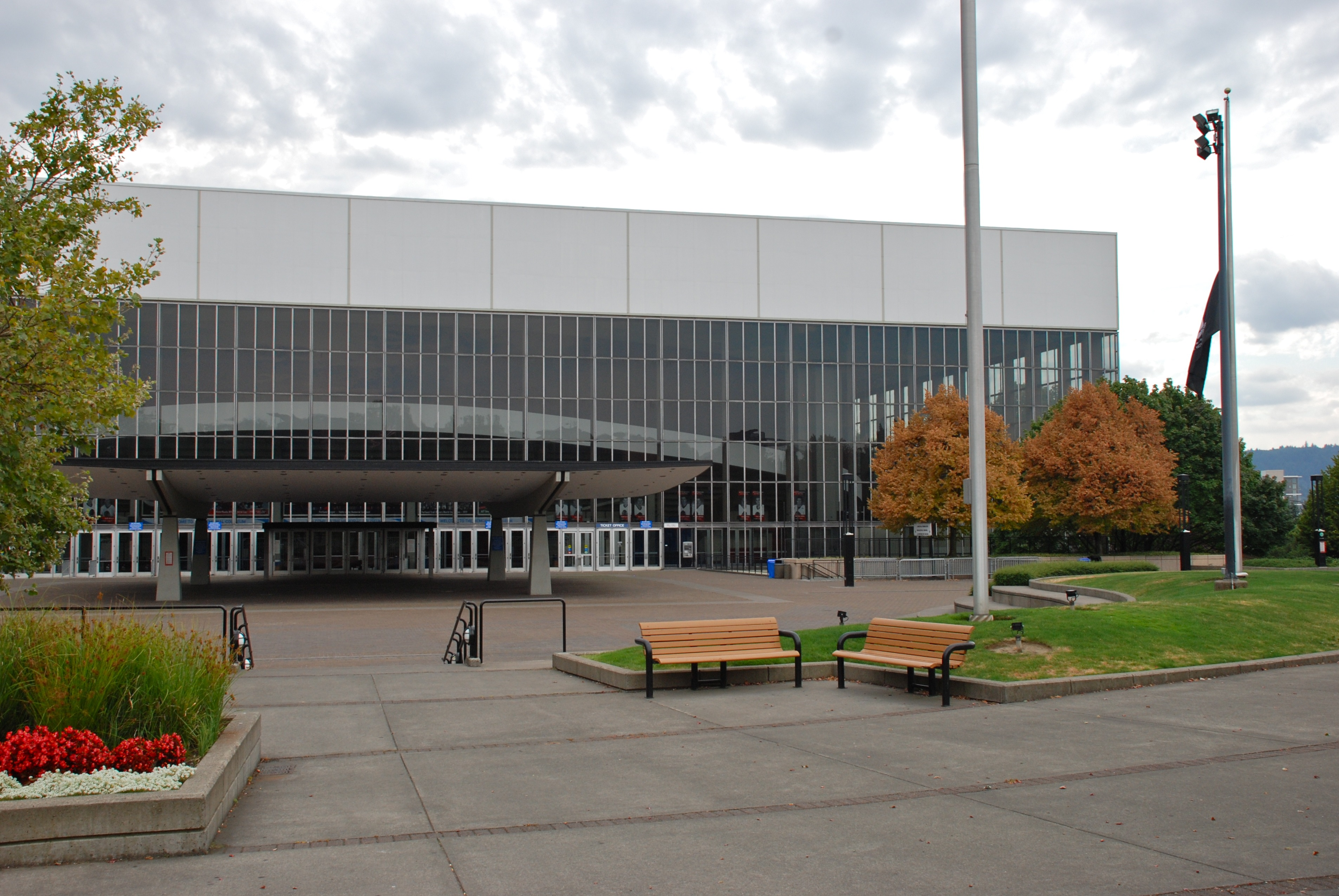
Northeast side and entrance in 2013

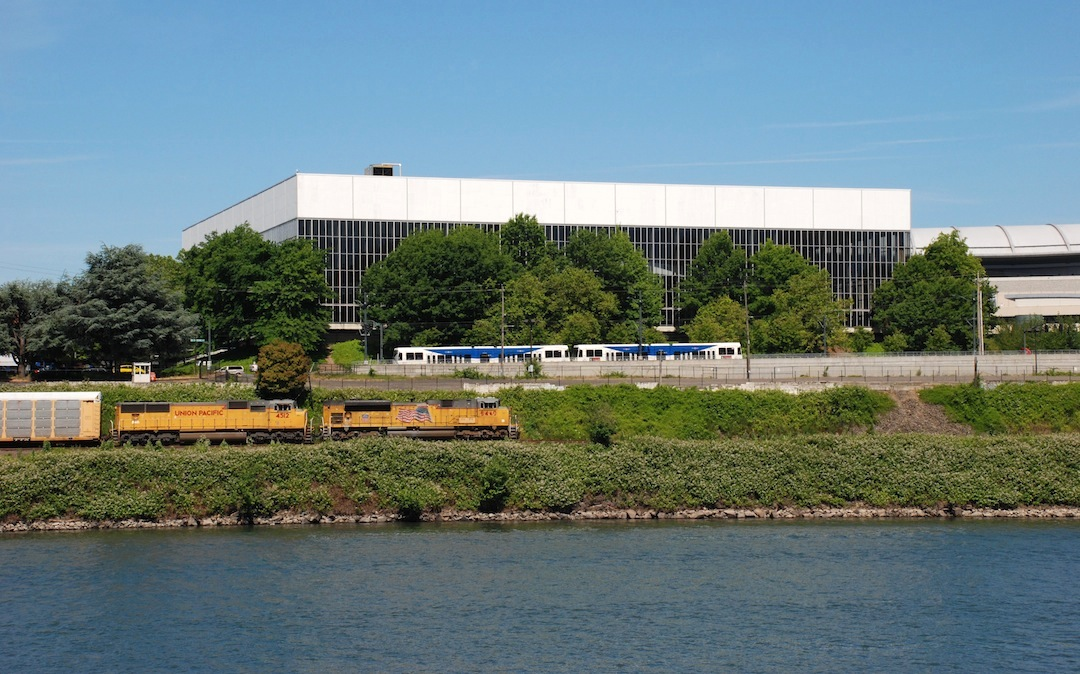
Southwest façade, viewed from across the Willamette River

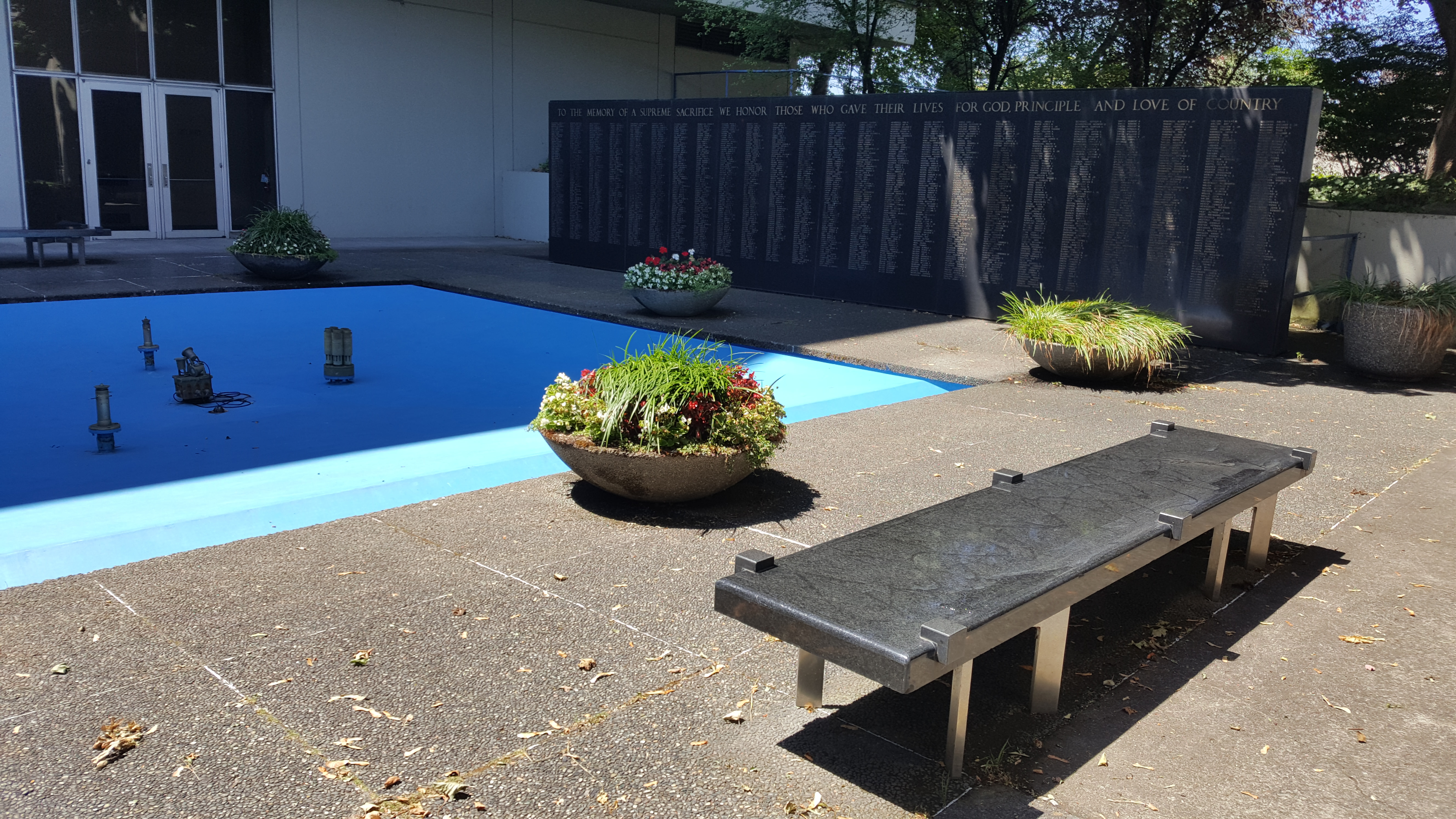
World War II Memorial, prior to 2021.

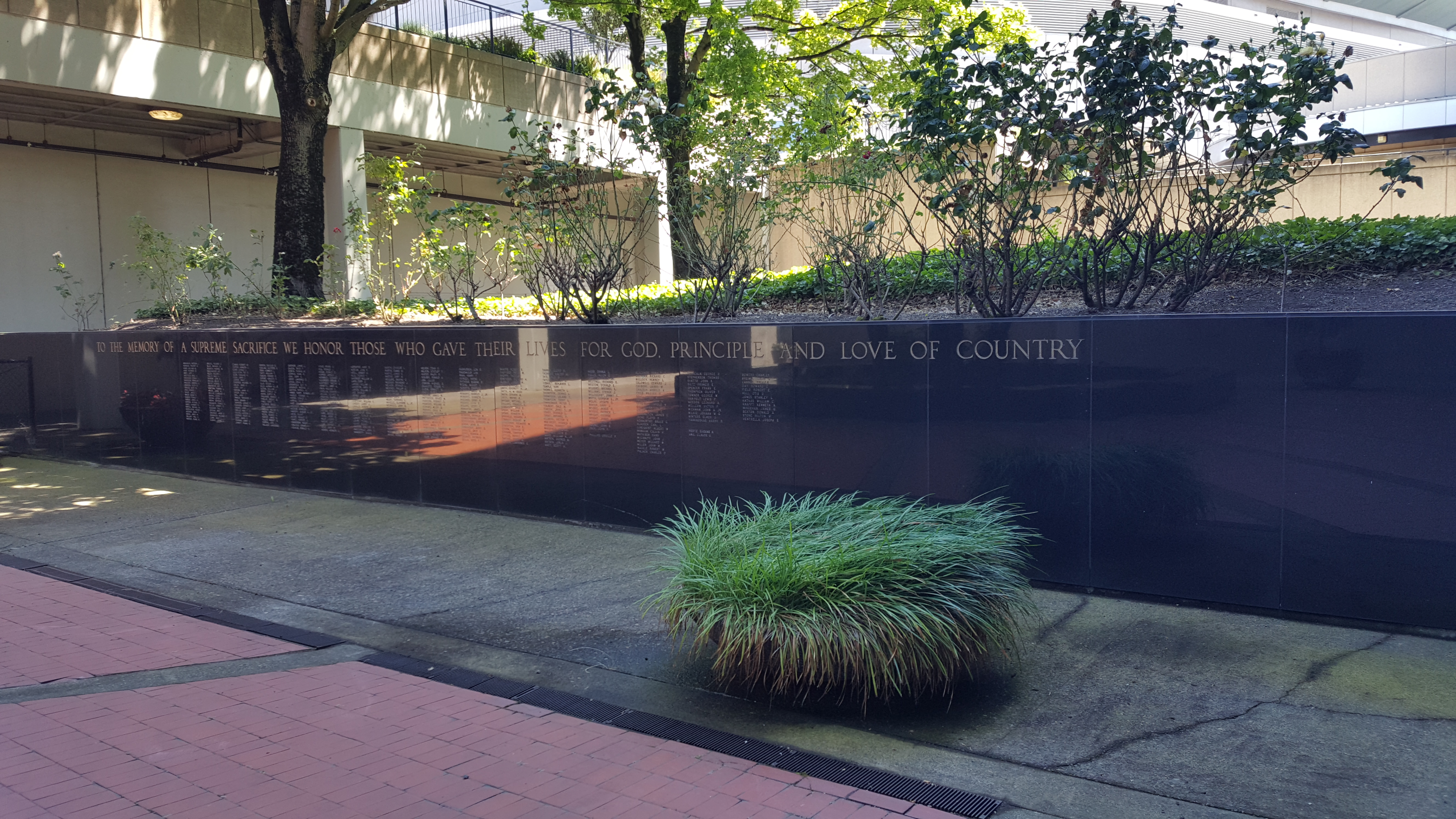
Korean War Memorial, prior to 2021.

Financed by an $8 million bond approved by voters in 1954, construction was completed by Hoffman Construction in 1960 and dedicated on January 8, 1961, to the "advancement of cultural opportunities for the community and to the memory of our veterans of all wars who made the supreme sacrifice." The facility is 100-foot (30 m) tall and has a footprint of about 3.1 acres (1.3 ha). It is sometimes referred to as "The Glass Palace" in Portland. The building was designed by architecture firm Skidmore, Owings & Merrill.

Original plans called for a building made of wood, which is plentiful in the region, but cost and safety factors precluded that. The structure instead consists of a modernistic gray glass and aluminum, non-load-bearing curtain-wall cube around a central ovular concrete seating bowl. Four 70-foot (21 m) concrete piers support the steel roof, with no interior columns required. The exterior appearance, with 80,000 square feet (7,400 m^{2}) of glass, is of a skyscraper laid on its side. The curtain-wall windows inside offer views of the city in all directions. The 1,060-foot-long (320 m) black curtains can be closed to block sunlight in 90 seconds. Seating included 9,000 permanent seats expandable to 14,000 with portable chairs and bleachers. At its opening, it was called the largest multipurpose facility of its kind in the Pacific Northwest.

The war memorial initially consisted of two black granite walls below ground level and near the main gate. The names of the dead are inscribed in gold paint, now faded with age. There are no dates given, only the names and an inscription: "To the memory of a supreme sacrifice we honor those who gave their lives for God, principle and love of country". In 2021, the panels to the memorial were placed into storage due to disrepair. A proposed design by NNA Landscape Architecture was submitted to the city and a contract is in the process of being created.

The International Style glass and concrete building was added to the National Register of Historic Places in September 2009.

In 2011, the Portland City Council voted to change the name of the arena from Memorial Coliseum to Veterans Memorial Coliseum, to better reflect its history as a memorial to war veterans, and as part of the larger Rose Quarter Development project.

The seating capacity for basketball has been as follows:

Years	Capacity
1960–1988	12,666
1988–1991	12,884
1991–2025	12,888
2025–present	10,000

In 2018, Avantika Bawa had a solo exhibition of drawings and prints of the Veterans Memorial Coliseum at the Portland Art Museum, as part of the APEX series curated by Grace Kook-Anderson.

== Future ==
In the late 2000s, it was proposed that Memorial Coliseum be demolished to make room for a 9,000-seat new ballpark for Merritt Paulson's Portland Beavers baseball team, since the team was moving from PGE Park to make room for the new Portland Timbers Major League Soccer franchise, also a Paulson-owned team. There had been talk about using two of the outer glass walls as part of the exterior for a new ballpark. Opposition to razing Memorial Coliseum included some veterans and architectural historians who successfully applied for National Register of Historic Places status for the building. Former governor Vic Atiyeh also opposed demolition if it led to the veteran memorial being forgotten. The Memorial Coliseum was given a rank of the highest importance in the city's historic resource inventory of 1984. The proposal to demolish Memorial Coliseum was dropped early in May 2009 with Lents Park being re-considered as a ballpark site.

Other proposed uses of the grounds include turning the site into an entertainment district, a recreation center, a retail center, or a multilevel center for arts, athletics, and education. Another possibility is to update and repair the facility to improve its marketability. In 2024, construction began on a ~$60 million renovation to be built in phases with all work completed by summer 2026. The work is being paid for by City bonds, on which all debt service is paid by the City/Metro/County Visitor Facilities Trust Account which collects a portion of local transient lodging taxes and vehicle rental car taxes.

== See also ==
- Culture of Portland, Oregon
- Delta Dome, a proposed stadium in 1964
- List of sports venues in Portland, Oregon
- List of tennis stadiums by capacity
- Memorial Fountain
- The Oregon Veterans of World War II Memorial at the Oregon Capitol grounds in Salem.
- Oregon Department of Veterans' Affairs

== External links and sources ==
- Rose Quarter - Venues
- Memorial Coliseum Reuse Study, a City of Portland website
- Memorial Coliseum in a Fight for its Life, from the website of Historic Preservation Northwest (February 16, 2003)
- Portland's crown jewel or a clunker?, a March 2004 article from the Portland Tribune
- Alternatives abound for coliseum's future, a July 2003 article from the Portland Tribune
- "Urban Home Center recommended for Memorial Coliseum redevelopment". Daily Journal of Commerce. May 2003.
- Save Memorial Coliseum
- National Register of Historic Places nomination
- Photo Gallery of Blazers-Suns game at MC on October 14, 2009

Events and tenants
Preceded by None	Home of the Portland Trail Blazers; 1970–1995	Succeeded by Rose Garden
Preceded by Olympic Stadium; Moscow	Davis Cup; Final Venue; 2007	Succeeded by Polideportivo Islas Malvinas; Mar del Plata
Preceded by Municipal Auditorium	NCAA Men's Division I Basketball Tournament; Finals Venue; 1965	Succeeded by Cole Field House
