= Pacific Northwest Geographical Union =

- Abbreviation: Pacific Northwest GU
- Formation: 2013
- Region served: Idaho; Oregon; Washington, United States of America

The Pacific Northwest Geographical Union is the Geographical Union (GU) for rugby union teams playing in the Idaho, Oregon and Washington (state) for USA Rugby.

== See also ==
- Rugby union in the United States
