= 1996 Heineken Cup final =

1996 Heineken Cup Final
- Event: 1995–96 Heineken Cup
Toulouse	Cardiff
(France)	(Wales)
21	18
- After extra time
- Date: 7 January 1996
- Venue: Cardiff Arms Park, Cardiff
- Referee: David McHugh (Ireland)
- Attendance: 21,800

The 1996 Heineken Cup Final was the final match of the 1995–96 Heineken Cup, the inaugural season of Europe's top club rugby union competition. The match was played on 7 January 1996 at the Arms Park in Cardiff. The match was contested by Cardiff of Wales and Toulouse of France. Toulouse won the match 21–18 after extra time; they took the lead with two tries in the first 10 minutes, but the kicking of Adrian Davies kept Cardiff level. With the scores at 15–12 as the clock ticked past 80 minutes, Davies stepped up again and slotted over a penalty to take the game to extra time. Christophe Deylaud restored Toulouse's lead with another penalty shortly after the game restarted, before Davies tied the scores up again. Then, going into the final few seconds of extra time, the referee penalised Cardiff for using hands in the ruck; Deylaud slotted the resulting penalty to seal Toulouse's victory.

== Match details ==
7 January 1996
13:30 GMT

Cardiff (Wales)	18–21 (a.e.t.)	(France) Toulouse
Pen: Davies (6)	Report	Try: Castaignède; Cazalbou; Con: Deylaud; Pen: Deylaud (2); Drop: Castaignède

Cardiff Arms Park, Cardiff
Attendance: 21,800
Referee: David McHugh (Ireland)

Cardiff	Toulouse

FB	15	(Wales) Mike Rayer
RW	14	(Wales) Steve Ford	(substituted off) 97'
OC	13	(Wales) Mike Hall
IC	12	(Wales) Mark Ring	(substituted off) 41'
LW	11	(Wales) Simon Hill
FH	10	(Wales) Adrian Davies
SH	9	(Wales) Andy Moore
LP	1	(Wales) Andrew Lewis
HK	2	(Wales) Jonathan Humphreys
TP	3	(Wales) Lyndon Mustoe
RL	4	(Wales) John Wakeford
LL	5	(Wales) Derwyn Jones
BF	6	(Wales) Emyr Lewis
OF	7	(Wales) Owain Williams
N8	8	(Wales) Hemi Taylor (c)
Substitutes:
CE	16	(Wales) Jonathan Davies	(substituted on) 41'
WG	17	(Wales) Nigel Walker	(substituted on) 97'
SH	18	(Wales) Andy Booth
FL	19	(Wales) Howard Stone
LK	20	(Wales) Keith Stewart
PR	21	(Wales) Mike Griffiths
HK	22	(Wales) Paul Young
Coach:
(Wales) Terry Holmes

FB	15	(France) Stéphane Ougier
RW	14	(France) Émile Ntamack (c)
OC	13	(France) Philippe Carbonneau	(substituted off) 93'
IC	12	(France) Thomas Castaignède
LW	11	(France) David Berty	(substituted off) 69'
FH	10	(France) Christophe Deylaud
SH	9	(France) Jérôme Cazalbou
LP	1	(France) Christian Califano
HK	2	(France) Patrick Soula
TP	3	(France) Christophe Portolan
RL	4	(France) Hugues Miorin
LL	5	(France) Franck Belot
BF	6	(France) Didier Lacroix	(substituted off) 58'
OF	7	(France) Hervé Manent
N8	8	(France) Sylvain Dispagne
Substitutes:
WG	16	(France) Ugo Mola	(substituted on) 69'
CE	17	(France) Éric Artiguste	(substituted on) 93'
FL	18	(France) Richard Castel	(substituted on) 58'
PR	19	(France) Christophe Guiter
FL	20	(France) Nicolas Bacqué
CE	21	(France) Olivier Carbonneau
PR	22	(France) Pascal Lasserre
Coach:
(France) Guy Novès

Touch judges:
Bertie Smith (Ireland)
Ronnie McDowell (Ireland)

== See also ==
- 1995–96 Heineken Cup
