= 1995–96 French Rugby Union Championship =

- Countries: France
- Champions: Toulouse (13th title)
- Runners-up: Brive
- Relegated: Nîmes, Périgueux, PUC, Dijon

The 1995–96 French Rugby Union Championship was played by 20 teams in the first division ("A1")

In the "A1" group were abstent historical clubs like Béziers, Biarritz, Tarbes, and FC Lourdes.

The teams were divided in two pool of 10, and the first 4 were directly qualified to the "Last 16" round, while the ranked from 5th to 8th were admitted to a "barrage" with eight teams from "A2" group.

Stade Toulousain won their 13th title winning the final against CA Brive, who lost their 4th final.

Four team were relegated to lower level: Bayonne, Racing club de France, Montpellier, RC Nice et FCS Rumilly that were replaced by Béziers, Biarritz, Périgueux, Dijon, and Paris Université Club.

Stade Toulousain won his 14th title beating in the final the Bourgoin, at his first final.

== Preliminary round ==
=== Pool 1 ===
Pos	Team	Points
1	Toulouse	43
2	Grenoble	41
3	Toulon	40
4	Narbonne	38
5	Agen	36
6	Perpignan	36
7	Nîmes	34
8	Nice	33
9	Bayonne	32
10	Racing club de France	27

=== Pool 2 ===
Pos	Team	Points
1	CA Brive	42
2	Bourgoin	41
3	Castres	38
4	Bordeaux-Begles	38
5	Montferrand	38
6	Pau	36
7	Dax	36
8	Colomiers	34
9	Rumilly	33
10	Montpellier	24

== Barrage ==
may ‘96	Nice	-	ES Catalane	9–12
may ‘96	Biarritz	-	Montferrand	3–40
may ‘96	Dax	-	Lourdes	49–13
may ‘96	Beziers	-	Perpignan	18–31
may ‘96	Auch	-	Colomiers	9–24
may ‘96	Agen	-	Dijon	35–3
may ‘96	PUC	-	Pau	28–54
may ‘96	Périgueux	-	Nîmes	18–15

== Last 16 ==
may ‘96	Toulouse	-	ES Catalane	27–16
may ‘96	Narbonne	-	Montferrand	23–20
may ‘96	Dax	-	Grenoble	28–14
may ‘96	Toulon	-	Perpignan	16–15
may ‘96	Brive	-	Colomiers	24–18
may ‘96	Agen	-	Bordeaux-Begles	25–18
may ‘96	Castres	-	Pau	6–14
may ‘96	Périgueux	-	Bourgoin	12–26

== Last 8 ==
may ‘96	Toulouse	-	Narbonne	12–9
may ‘96	Dax	-	Toulon	25–11
may ‘96	Brive	-	Agen	13–12
may ‘96	Pau	-	Bourgoin	21–18

== Semifinals ==
may '96	Toulouse	-	Dax	36–23
may '96	Brive	-	Pau	23–21

== Final ==
1 June 1996

Toulouse	20 – 13	Brive
Try: Berty; Pen: Deylaud; Castaignède (2); Drop: Deylaud; Castaignède		Try: R.Paillat; Con: S.Paillat; Pen: S.Paillat (2)

Parc des Princes, Paris
Referee: Patrick Thomas

FB	15	(France) Stéphane Ougier
RW	14	(France) Émile Ntamack (c)
OC	13	(France) Philippe Carbonneau
IC	12	(France) Thomas Castaignède
LW	11	(France) David Berty
FH	10	(France) Christophe Deylaud	(substituted off) 76'
SH	9	(France) Jérôme Cazalbou	(substituted off) 79'
N8	8	(France) Sylvain Dispagne
OF	7	(France) Hervé Manent
BF	6	(France) Didier Lacroix	(substituted off) 63'
RL	5	(France) Franck Belot
LL	4	(France) Hugues Miorin
TP	3	(France) Claude Portolan
HK	2	(France) Patrick Soula
LP	1	(France) Christian Califano
Substitutions:
HK	16	(France) Christophe Guiter
PR	17	(France) Pascal Lasserre
FL	18	(France) Jean-Luc Cester
FL	19	(France) Richard Castel	(substituted in) 63'
CE	20	(France) Olivier Carbonneau	(substituted in) 79'
CE	21	(France) Éric Artiguste	(substituted in) 76'
FB	22	(France) Ugo Mola
Coach:
(France) Guy Novès

FB	15	(France) Sébastien Paillat
RW	14	(France) Sébastien Carrat	(substituted off) 16'
OC	13	(France) Romuald Paillat
IC	12	(France) Jean-Marie Soubira
LW	11	(France) Christophe Lucquiaud
FH	10	(France) Alain Penaud (c)
SH	9	(France) Sébastien Bonnet
N8	8	(France) Thierry Labrousse	(substituted off) 73'
OF	7	(France) Alain Carminati
BF	6	(Belgium) Loïc Van der Linden
RL	5	(France) Laurent Bonventre
LL	4	(France) Éric Alégret	(substituted off) 76'
TP	3	(France) Richard Crespy
HK	2	(France) Vincent Moscato
LP	1	(France) Didier Casadeï
Substitutions:
PR	16	(France) Sotele Puleoto
PR	17	(France) Arnaud Boudie
LK	18	(France) Yvan Manhès	(substituted in) 76'
N8	19	(France) François Duboisset	(substituted in) 73'
SH	20	(France) Bruno Marty
WG	21	(France) Didier Faugeron	(substituted in) 16'
FB	22	(France) Alain Guettache
Coach:
(France) Laurent Seigne
