= 1993–94 French Rugby Union Championship =

French Rugby Championship 1993–94
- Countries: France
- Number of teams: 32 teams
- Champions: Toulouse
- Runners-up: Montferrand
- Relegated: Mont de Marsan, Lourdes, Beziers, LOU

The 1993–94 French Rugby Union Championship was contested by 32 clubs divided into four pools. At the end of the first phase, the teams placed in the first four places of each pool were admitted to the "Top 16" arranged with four pools of four teams. The first two of each pool were admitted to the quarter-finals.

The four clubs of Périgueux, Dijon, Lyon OU and Lourdes, the newcomer, coming from "Group B" 1992-93.

Toulouse won its 11th title, beating Montferrand in the final. Toulouse became, with Béziers, the winner of the most titles. Montferrand lost another final. At the end of the season Mon de Marsan, Lourdes, Béziers and Lyon OU were relegated.

== Participants ==
Teams listed as in the final ranking. Teams in bold qualified to the next round.

**Pool 1**

- **CA Bègtles-Bordeaux**
- **Castres**
- **Montferrand**
- **Bayonne**
- Brive
- Rumilly
- RRC Nice
- Périgueux

**Pool 3**

- **Agen**
- **Biarritz**
- **Bourgoin-Jallieu**
- **Narbonne**
- Nîmes
- Pau
- Lourdes
- Graulhet

**Pool 2**

- **Auch**
- **Toulouse**
- **Grenoble**
- **Dax**
- Stadoceste tarbais
- Dijon
- Mon de Marsan
- Avenir Valencien

**Pool 4**

- **Perpignan**
- **Racing Paris**
- **Colomiers**
- **RC Toulon**
- Stade bordelais UC
- Montpellier
- Béziers
- Lyon OU

== Top 16 ==
Team listed as in the final ranking. Teams in bold qualified to next round.

**Pool 1**

- **Toulouse**
- **Narbonne**
- CA Bègles-Bordeaux
- Colomiers

**Pool 2**

- **RC Toulon**
- **Agen**
- Bayonne
- Auch

**Pool 3**

- **Grenoble**
- **Montferrand**
- Racing Paris
- Biarritz

**Pool 4**

- **Dax**
- **Bourgoin-Jallieu**
- Perpignan
- Castres

== Final stages ==
=== Quarter-finals ===
May 1994	**Dax**	**18 - 9**	**Bourgoin**

4 May 1994	**Montferrand**	**15 – 8**	**Toulon**	Lyon
	Pen: Pradier 4' 7' 17' 38' 78'		Pen: Loppy 57'	Attendance: 10.000; Referee: Barrabes

15 May 1994	**Toulouse**	**26 – 12**	**Narbonne**	Stade Maurice Trélut, Tarbes
	Try: Cazalbou 51', Ougier 58'; O. Carbonneau 79'; Con: Deylaud; Pen: Deylaud 22', Ntamack 11' 30'		Pen: Marfaing 13' 25' 33' 53'	Attendance: 3.710; Referee: M. Thomas

May1994	**Grenoble**	**15 - 11**	**Agen**

=== Semifinals ===
21 May 1994	**Montferrand**	**22 – 15**	**Grenoble**	Nimes
	Try: Saint-André 57'; Con: Pradier 57'; Pen: Pradier 5 (1', 12', 18', 22', 72' )		Pen: Savy 3 (7' 9' 31'), Vélo (35'); Drop: Goirand (16')	Attendance: 15.000; Referee: M. Casteret

21 May 1994	**Toulouse**	**30 – 25**	**Dax**	Parc Lescure, Bordeaux
	Try: Portolan (15') et Berty 2 (47' e 52'); Con: Deylaud 3 (15' 47' 52'); Pen: Deylaud (6'); Drop: Deylaud 2 (72' 74')		Try: Roumat (78'); Con: Lacroix (78'); Pen: Lacroix 5 (24' 40' 59' 63' 68'); Drop: Lacroix (45')	Attendance: 9.317; Referee: Didier Mené

=== Final ===
28 May 1994

**Toulouse**	**22 – 16**	**Montferrand**
Try: Cazalbou (63'); Con: Deylaud (63'); Pen: Deylaud (3) (38', 52', 77'); Drop: Deylaud (2) (40', 66')		Try: Juillet (60'); Con: Pradier (60'); Pen: Pradier (3) (6', 26', 34')

Parc des Princes, Paris
Referee: Marc Desclaux

FB	15	(France) Joël Dupuy
RW	14	(France) Émile Ntamack
OC	13	(France) Philippe Carbonneau	(substituted off) 79'
IC	12	(France) Olivier Carbonneau	(substituted off) 64'
LW	11	(France) David Berty
FH	10	(France) Christophe Deylaud
SH	9	(France) Jérôme Cazalbou
N8	8	(France) Albert Cigagna (c)
OF	7	(France) Régis Sonnes
BF	6	(France) Jean-Luc Cester
RL	5	(France) Franck Belot
LL	4	(France) Hugues Miorin
TP	3	(France) Claude Portolan
HK	2	(France) Patrick Soula	(substituted off) 77'
LP	1	(France) Christian Califano
Substitutions:
HK	16	(France) Christophe Guiter	(substituted in) 77'
PR	17	(France) Patrick Diniz
LK	18	(France) Jean Joanny
FL	19	(France) Didier Lacroix
CE	20	(France) Thomas Castaignède	(substituted in) 64'
FB	21	(France) Ugo Mola	(substituted in) 79'
Coach:
(France) Guy Novès

FB	15	(France) Gilles Darlet
RW	14	(France) Raphaël Saint-André
OC	13	(France) Fabrice Ribeyrolles
IC	12	(France) Philippe Saint-André
LW	11	(France) Fabien Bertrank
FH	10	(France) Éric Nicol
SH	9	(France) Marc Pradier
N8	8	(France) Christophe Juillet
OF	7	(France) Jean-Marc Lhermet (c)
BF	6	(France) Arnaud Costes
RL	5	(France) Jean-Philippe Versailles
LL	4	(France) Éric Lecomte
TP	3	(France) Christophe Duchêne
HK	2	(France) Philippe Marocco
LP	1	(France) Emmanuel Menieu
Substitutions:
HK	16	(France) Olivier Mallaret
LK	17	(France) Raphaël Chamelot
FL	18	(France) Ghislain Couchard
SH	19	(France) Patrick Ladouce
FH	20	(France) Laurent Romeu
WG	21	(France) Gaëtan Héry
Coach:
(France) Patrick Boucheix

== Bibliografia ==
- Un siècle de rugby (in French). Calmann-Lévy. 17 November 2010. ISBN 978-2-7021-4118-2. siècle.
