= 1998–99 French Rugby Union Championship =

- Countries: France
- Champions: Toulouse (15th title)
- Runners-up: Montferrand
- Relegated: Nice, Béziers

The 1998–99 French Rugby Union Championship was played by 24 teams divided in the preliminary phase into three pools of 8. The first five teams from each pool and the best 6th placed were admitted to second round. The other played a relegation tournament divided in two pools.

Toulouse won the title, beating Montferrand in the final (marking their 6th loss in the final).

== First round ==
=== Pool 1 ===
Pos	Team	Points
1	Stade Français	34
2	Biarritz	34
3	Narbonne	32
4	Castres	32
5	Bourgoin	29
6	Toulon	28
7	Aurillac	21
8	Nîmes	14

=== Pool 2 ===
Pos	Team	Points
1	Perpignan	34
2	Montferrand	33
3	Agen	32
4	Dax	31
5	Bègles-Bordeaux	29
6	Béziers	28
7	Auch	20
8	Nice	17

=== Pool 3 ===
Pos	Team	Points
1	Toulouse	38
2	Brive	36
3	Pau	33
4	Grenoble	30
5	Colomiers	26
6	Périgueux	23
7	Racing Paris	20
8	La Rochelle	18

Béziers and Toulon had both 28 points. The "best 6th" was Toulon due to having less "red Cards" during the season.

== Second round ==
The first of each pools were qualified to quarter of finals

=== Pool 1 ===
Pos	Team	Points
1	Toulouse	15
2	Bourgoin	13
3	Biarritz	10
4	Agen	10

=== Pool 3 ===
Pos	Team	Points
1	CA Bègles-Bordeaux	14
2	Castres	14
3	Perpignan	12
4	Dax	8

=== Pool 2 ===
Pos	Team	Points
1	Colomiers	16
2	Stade Français	12
3	Narbonne	10
4	Pau	10

=== Pool 4 ===
Pos	Team	Points
1	Montferrand	14
2	Grenoble	12
3	Toulon	12
4	Brive	10

Grenoble was 2nd due to having less "red cards" during the season .

== Quarters of final ==
15 may	Bordeaux-Begles	-	Bourgoin	8–14
15 may	Toulouse	-	Stade Français	51–19
16 may	Montferrand	-	Castres	28–27
16 may	Colomiers	-	Grenoble	15–29

== Semifinals ==
22 may	Montferrand	-	Grenoble	26–17
22 may	Toulouse	-	Bourgoin	26–17

== Final ==
29 May 1999

Toulouse	15 – 11	Montferrand
Try: Stensness; Desbrosse; Con: Marfaing; Pen: Marfaing		Try: Nadau; Pen: Merceron (2)

Stade de France, Saint-Denis
Referee: Gérard Borréani

FB	15	(France) Stéphane Ougier
RW	14	(France) Xavier Garbajosa
OC	13	(France) Cédric Desbrosse	(substituted off) 72'
IC	12	(France) Émile Ntamack
LW	11	(France) Michel Marfaing
FH	10	(New Zealand) Lee Stensness
SH	9	(France) Jérôme Cazalbou
N8	8	(France) Sylvain Dispagne	(substituted off) 39'
OF	7	(France) Christian Labit	(substituted off) 77'
BF	6	(France) Didier Lacroix
RL	5	(France) Franck Belot (c)
LL	4	(France) Fabien Pelous
TP	3	(France) Franck Tournaire	(substituted off) 72'
HK	2	(France) Yannick Bru
LP	1	(France) Christian Califano
Substitutions:
HK	16	(France) Patrick Soula
PR	17	(France) Jean-Louis Jordana	(substituted on) 72'
LK	18	(France) Hugues Miorin	(substituted on) 39'
FL	19	(France) Matthieu Lièvremont	(substituted on) 77'
SH	20	(France) Jérôme Fillol
FH	21	(France) Christophe Deylaud
CE	22	(France) Pierre Bondouy	(substituted on) 72'
Coach:
(France) Guy Novès

FB	15	(France) Nicolas Nadau	(substituted off) 78'
RW	14	(France) Jimmy Marlu
OC	13	(France) Jérôme Morante
IC	12	(France) Tony Marsh
LW	11	(France) David Bory
FH	10	(France) Gérald Merceron	(substituted off) 67'
SH	9	(France) Stéphane Castaignède	(substituted off) 80+3'
N8	8	(France) David Courteix
OF	7	(France) Jean-Marc Lhermet (c)	(substituted off) 67'
BF	6	(France) Arnaud Costes
RL	5	(France) Christophe Sarraute	(substituted off) 59'
LL	4	(France) David Barrier
TP	3	(France) Fabrice Heyer
HK	2	(France) Olivier Azam	(substituted off) 67'
LP	1	(France) Emmanuel Menieu	(substituted off) 80+1'
Substitutions:
HK	16	(France) Patrick Laurent-Varange	(substituted on) 67'
PR	17	(France) Christophe Duchêne	(substituted on) 80+1'
LK	18	(France) Olivier Merle	(substituted on) 59'
FL	19	(France) Jérôme Bonvoisin	(substituted on) 67'
SH	20	(France) Christophe Larrue	(substituted on) 80+3'
FH	21	(France) Éric Nicol	(substituted on) 67'
FB	22	(France) Olivier Toulouze	(substituted on) 78'
Coach:
(France) Christophe Mombet

== Relegation Pools ==
=== Pool 1 ===
Pos	Team	Points
1	Auch	14
2	Racing Paris	14
3	Nîmes	10
4	Béziers	10

Béziers was classified last for worst point difference in the direct matches (Nîmes-Béziers 15–5; 36–37), and was relegated in Pro D2.

=== Pool 2 ===
Pos	Team	Points
1	Aurillac	15
2	Périgueux	11
3	La Rochelle	9
4	Nice	5

(ranking after 5 on 6)

RC Nice was relegated in Pro D2.
