= Toulouse Masters (rugby union) =

International rugby union tournaments

The Toulouse International Rugby Masters were two international rugby union tournaments organised by Toulouse rugby club. The first, held in 1986 and known as the "Matra Espace or Matra Masters" for sponsorship reasons, is sometimes informally referred to as the first World Club Championships due to the participants within the competition representing seven clubs and one touring side from seven countries across three continents. The second tournament, held in 1990 and referred to as the Centenary Masters, marked the centenary of the club. Toulouse were the champions of both editions. The tournaments are viewed as the precursor to the European Rugby Champions Cup, in which Toulouse were crowned the winners of the first edition in 1996.

== History ==
Jean Fabre, newly elected President of Toulouse rugby club, conceived the idea of an international rugby union club tournament to help pay for the costs to complete improvements in their new stadium, Stade des Sept Deniers, following their move in 1978 from Stade des Ponts Jumeaux.

Fabre was influenced by the FIRA European Champions Cup (1962-1967) and by a mini-tournament that was organised by AS Béziers in 1978. The Trophee International Cadenat (Cadenat International Trophy), named after the co-founder of AS Béziers, Jules Cadenat, was an international expansion to the 1970s domestic competition Challenge Jules Cadenat (Jules Cadenat Challenge). In this 1978 international version, three teams from Coventry R.F.C. (from England), Petrarca Rugby (from Italy), and Glamorgan (from Wales) were invited to participate. Béziers defeated Glamorgan 31-8 in the final.

The French Rugby Federation (FFR) did not support clubs hosting mini tournaments, which meant any costs incurred hosting unofficial rugby events would be borne by the organising clubs alone. Fabre attained some support from businesses such as Matra Espace (as the main sponsor), La cinq (who screened matches), Aérospatiale, and UTA. The FFR soon relented in their refusal to be involved and provided minimal assistance in the hosting of the tournament.

Fabre hoped the tournament would be the creation of a European Club Cup competition, which would include four British and Irish teams (one club each from England, Ireland, Scotland, and Wales), two teams from FIRA (Now Rugby Europe) and two teams from France, however, the British and Irish clubs declined their invitation. Fabre discarded the European Club Cup competition idea and turned to the southern hemisphere. He invited Ponsonby (from New Zealand) and West Brisbane (from Australia) and while both clubs initially gave assurances of their participation, they soon sent notice of their withdrawal from the tournament due to financial constraints on travelling. Fabre agreed to cover both clubs travelling expenses on condition they participated. Both clubs agreed, however, this decision by Fabre heavily impacted the finances of Toulouse. Banco Nación (from Argentina) and the Fiji Barbarians, who were touring South America and Europe, filled the remaining positions left vacant by the British and Irish clubs declining their invitations. Farul Constanta (from Romania) and L'Aquila (from Italy) (who replaced the Italian champions Petrarca Rugby after they declined their invitation) made up the FIRA invitees and Agen was the other French team that participated.

The 1986 tournament was a great success and Fabre sought to revitalise his idea of creating a European Club Cup competition, with the inclusion of British and Irish clubs, this time to mark the centenary of Toulouse rugby club. Pierre Villepreux who had coached the Toulouse team in their 1986 Matra Masters victory was handed the responsibility of organising the 1990 tournament. Bath (from England) were the only British club to accept their invitation. However, their main stars did not arrive for the tournament and Villepreux was not impressed that Bath did not order these players to attend, despite this being before the professional era in rugby union and where players required employment to support themselves and their families. Rumours began to materialise that Toulouse were offering cash incentives to each of their players that participated in a game where they were victorious. More problems appeared when the invitations to other French clubs and to the selected FIRA clubs were declined, however, both Wellington (from New Zealand), and Queensland (from Australia) agreed to participate, on the same conditions Ponsonby and West Brisbane had in the previous tournament, that Toulouse cover the travelling expenses. The final places were made up by national teams that include a Fiji XV (as part of their tour of Hong Kong and France), Romania XV, Soviet Union XV, and Western Samoa XV.

Fabre left his position as president of Stade Tolousain just before the commencement of his second masters tournament in 1990. It was not revealed until 1993 that both masters tournaments left a heavy dent on the clubs finances. While the tournaments seemed on the outside to be a success, inside the club, due in part to Toulouse officials travelling to the southern hemisphere clubs, covering travelling expenses of the southern hemisphere clubs while in France and unforeseen expenses related to television broadcasts, left the club on the verge of bankruptcy. Future plans for further editions of the competition were subsequently shelved.

=== Later Rugby Masters ===
Two further rugby masters stand alone matches were played in later years that were not organised by Toulouse. In the first of these games, the format which was similar to Rugby League's World Club Challenge pitted the winner of the Heineken Cup in Europe against the winner of Super Rugby in the Southern Hemisphere for the right to claim best in the World. The match between the champions of the 1996–97 Heineken Cup, Brive (from France) and the champions of the 1997 Super 12, the Auckland Blues (from New Zealand) ended in a 47-11 demolition win for the New Zealand team. The second masters match brought together the champions of the 2014–15 European Rugby Champions Cup, Toulon (from France) against the eleventh best team in the 2015 Super Rugby season, the Natal Sharks (from South Africa) and ended in a narrow 12-10 win for the South Africans.

== 1986 Matra Masters ==
The participating teams consisted of Toulouse as hosts and champions of the 1985–86 French Rugby Union Championship, Agen, finalists in the 1985–86 French Rugby Union Championship, L'Aquila, runners up in the Campeonato Italiano de Rugby 1985-86, Farul Constanta champions of the 1985/86 Romanian Championship, Banco Nación co-champions of the 1986 Buenos Aires Championship, West Brisbane champions of the 1985 Queensland Premiership, Ponsonby champions of the 1986 Auckland Championship, and the on tour Fiji Barbarians.

Farul Constanta upset the apple cart by defeating Ponsonby in their quarter-final. The result shocked not just the hosts, who feared a loss of revenue as a consequence, but also Ponsonby's captain Andy Haden who departed France on the first plane available embarrassed and angry with his team mates. The other quarter-finals went according to script with Toulouse, West Brisbane, and Agen defeating Banco Nación, L'Aquila, and the Fiji Barbarians respectively.

In the semi-finals, Farul Constanta were again rewriting the script by defeating Agen, however, the game is noted for its brutality which resulted in multiple Farul Constanta players missing the final through injury. The other semi-final was a one-sided affair with Toulouse easily defeating West Brisbane. However, West Brisbane would regain some honour when they defeated Agen in the Bronze final. In the final, Toulouse swept away an injured ridden Farul Constanta to claim the first edition of the Toulouse Masters.

Quarter-finals
Toulouse	32
Banco Nación	22
West Brisbane	22
L'Aquila	13
Farul Constanta	21
Ponsonby	15
Agen	19
Fiji Barbarians	14

Semi-finals
Toulouse	27
West Brisbane	3
Farul Constanta	10
Agen	3

Final
Toulouse	47
Farul Constanta	3
Third place
West Brisbane	17
Agen	12

=== Quarter-finals ===
17 December 1986

Toulouse	32–22	Banco Nación

Stade Ernest-Wallon, Toulouse

17 December 1986

West Brisbane	22–13	L'Aquila

17 December 1986

Farul Constanta	21–15	Ponsonby

Parc Municipal des Sports, Brive

17 December 1986

Agen	19–14	Fiji Barbarians

Stade Armandie, Agen

=== Semi-finals ===
21 December 1986

Toulouse	27–3	West Brisbane

Stade Ernest-Wallon, Toulouse

21 December 1986

Farul Constanta	10–3	Agen

Stade Armandie, Agen
Attendance: 12,000

=== Bronze Final ===
23 December 1986

West Brisbane	17–12	Agen

Stade Armandie, Agen

=== Final ===
23 December 1986

Toulouse	47–3	Farul Constanta

Stade Ernest-Wallon, Toulouse
Attendance: 12,000

== 1990 Centenary Masters ==
The competition split the teams up into two groups. The first group, Europe, consisted of Toulouse, Semi-finalists in the 1989–90 French Championship, Bath, winners of the 1989–90 Pilkington Cup, and two national teams from Romania and the Soviet Union. The second group, the Southern Hemisphere, consisted of Queensland, a provincial union in Australia, Wellington, 1989 and 1990 New Zealand provincial champions, and two national teams from Fiji and Western Samoa. This splitting of the groups based on geography occurred to avoid a similar scenario as the previous tournament in 1986 when the southern hemisphere teams were knocked out early from the tournament. The winner of the Europe section would play the winner of the Oceania section.

A repeat shock did occur in the quarter-finals with the Fiji XV easily defeating Wellington from New Zealand. The other quarter-finals went according to script with Toulouse, Bath, and Queensland progressing to the Semi-finals following their respective defeat of Romania XV, Soviet Union XV, and Western Samoa XV. Both semi-finals were generally one-sided affairs. In the game between Toulouse and Bath, the visitors were phased by the rapturous celebrations of the home fans who beat drums and blew trumpets and hooters, creating a deafening environment. Bonneval, Cazalbou (with two) and Soula scored four unanswered tries for Toulouse, with Marfaing picking up the extras with a conversion and a penalty. Tim Reeman kicked two penalties for the consolation scores for understrength Bath team. While in the other semi-final, Queensland easily defeated Fiji XV, thereby preventing another shock. However, Fiji XV would regain some honour in the Bronze final when they scored twelve tries to Baths three tries. The Fijians' speed and agility left the inexperienced Bath players feeling utterly dejected. In the final Toulouse were comfortable winners over Queensland to claim for the second time the Toulouse Masters crown.

Quarter-finals
Toulouse	34
Romania XV	17
Bath	13
Soviet Union XV	7
Queensland	16
Western Samoa XV	10
Wellington	9
Fiji XV	30

Semi-finals
Toulouse	23
Bath	6
Queensland	22
Fiji XV	12

Final
Toulouse	21
Queensland	10
Third place
Bath	19
Fiji XV	60

=== Quarter-finals ===
15 December 1990

Toulouse	34–17	Romania XV

Stade Ernest-Wallon, Toulouse

15 December 1990

Bath	13–7	Soviet Union XV

15 December 1990

Queensland	16–10	Western Samoa XV

15 December 1990

Wellington	9–30	Fiji XV

=== Semi-finals ===
19 December 1990

Toulouse	23–6	Bath

Stade Ernest-Wallon, Toulouse
Attendance: 12,000

21 December 1986

Queensland	22–12	Fiji XV

=== Bronze Final ===
22 December 1990

Bath	19–60	Fiji XV

=== Final ===
22 December 1990

Toulouse	21–10	Queensland

Stade Ernest-Wallon, Toulouse

== See also ==
- Club World Cup (rugby union)
