= 1995–96 Heineken Cup =

Rugby union competition

Tournament details
- Countries: France; Ireland; Italy; Romania; Wales
- Tournament format(s): Round-robin and Knockout
- Date: 31 October 1995 to 7 January 1996

Tournament statistics
- Teams: 12
- Matches played: 15
- Attendance: 97,535 (6,502 per match)
- Top point scorer(s): Adrian Davies (Cardiff) (58 points)
- Top try scorer(s): Philippe Bernat-Salles (Bordeaux); David Berty (Toulouse); Thomas Castaignède (Toulouse); Piero Dotto (Treviso); Mike Hall (Cardiff); Alan Harris (Swansea); Sebastien Loubsens (Bordeaux); Leandro Manteri (Treviso); Andy Moore (Cardiff); Émile Ntamack (Toulouse); Conor O'Shea (Leinster); Massimiliano Perziano (Treviso) (2 tries)

Final
- Venue: National Stadium, Cardiff
- Attendance: 21,800
- Champions: (France) Toulouse (1st title)
- Runners-up: (Wales) Cardiff

The 1995–96 Heineken Cup was the first edition of the Heineken Cup, which became the annual rugby union European club competition for clubs from the top nations in European rugby. Competing teams from France, Ireland, Italy, Wales and, for the only time to date, Romania, were divided into four pools of three, in which teams played each other only once, meaning one home and one away game per team. The winners of the pools qualified for the knock-out stages.

== Background ==
The Five Nations Committee met in December 1994 to discuss proposals for a multi-national European club competition. It was proposed that the top four teams in Wales, England, France, Ireland and Scotland would compete. Welsh, English and French clubs had welcomed the idea, but the RFU were concerned that it might devalue the Courage League. In May 1995, the Committee gave the go-ahead for a pilot European Cup tournament to be held in the autumn of 1995, and a full competition to follow in 1996. Clubs from England, Wales, France and provincial or divisional sides from Ireland and Scotland, and possibly the top club from Romania, would be invited to compete.

However, English and Scottish teams would be unable to participate as it was too late to change their domestic league schedules to accommodate the new competition. The IRFU confirmed that Ireland would enter provincial teams, as their clubs were unlikely to be strong enough for the competition. They were initially offered two places, but Tom Kiernan, Ireland's representative on the organising committee, was able to secure a third. The three places would go to the top three teams in the 1994 IRFU Interprovincial Championship, Munster, Ulster and Leinster. The three Welsh teams would be the top two in the Welsh Premier Division, Cardiff and Pontypridd, and the winners of the WRU Challenge Cup, Swansea. France entered the top two teams in the 1994-95 French championship, Toulouse and Castres, and cup runners-up Bègles-Bordeaux.

In October, ITV secured the UK TV rights for the competition in a three-year deal, and Dutch brewing company Heineken was announced as the competition's sponsor.

== Teams ==
France	Wales	Ireland	Romania	Italy
Castres; Toulouse; Bordeaux	Cardiff; Pontypridd; Swansea	Leinster; Munster; Ulster	Farul Constanţa	Benetton Treviso; Rugby Milano

== Pool stage ==
The twelve teams were arranged into four pools of three, with each team playing the other team in their pool once. Two points were awarded for a win, and one point for a draw. The four pool winners qualified for the knockout stage.

=== Pool 1 ===
Team	P	W	D	L	Tries for	Tries against	Try diff	Points for	Points against	Points diff	Pts	Status
(France) Toulouse	2	2	0	0	8	1	7	72	19	53	4	Advanced to the semi-finals
(Italy) Benetton Treviso	2	1	0	1	12	1	11	95	26	69	2	Eliminated
(Romania) Farul Constanţa	2	0	0	2	2	20	−18	18	140	−122	0	Eliminated

31 October 1995
15:00

Farul Constanţa (Romania)	10–54	(France) Toulouse
Try: Mihai Foca; Con: Emil Florea; Pen: Emil Florea		Try: Stéphane Ougier; Émile Ntamack (2); Thomas Castaignède; David Berty (2); Jean-Luc Cester; Penalty try Con: Christophe Deylaud (7)

Constanta
Attendance: 3,000
Referee: Robert Davies

7 November 1995
20:00

Benetton Treviso (Italy)	86–8	(Romania) Farul Constanţa
Try: Piero Dotto (2); Massimiliano Perziano (2); Leandro Manteri (2); Alessandro Troncon; Nicola Giuliato; Julian Gardner; Carlo Checchinato; Con: Michael Lynagh (10); Pen: Michael Lynagh (2)		Try: Dorin Talaba; Pen: Emil Florea

Stadio Comunale di Monigo
Attendance: 3,000
Referee: Brian Stirling

15 December 1995
20:00

Toulouse (France)	18–9	(Italy) Benetton Treviso
Pen: Christophe Deylaud (5); Drop: Christophe Deylaud		Pen: Michael Lynagh (2); Drop: Michael Lynagh

Les Sept Deniers
Attendance: 6,085
Referee: John Bacigalupo

=== Pool 2 ===
Team	P	W	D	L	Tries for	Tries against	Try diff	Points for	Points against	Points diff	Pts	Status
(Wales) Cardiff	2	1	1	0	7	1	6	60	20	40	3	Advanced to the semi-finals
(France) Bègles-Bordeaux	2	1	1	0	6	3	3	43	30	13	3	Eliminated
(Ireland) Ulster	2	0	0	2	2	11	−9	22	75	−53	0	Eliminated

21 November 1995
20:00

Bègles-Bordeaux (France)	14–14	(Wales) Cardiff
Try: Philippe Bernat-Salles; Pen: Vincent Etcheto		Try: Mark Bennett; Pen: Adrian Davies

Stade Andre Moga
Attendance: 10,000
Referee: David McHugh

28 November 1995
19:15

Cardiff (Wales)	46–6	(Ireland) Ulster
Try: Mike Hall; Stephen John; Adrian Davies; Andy Moore (2); Con: Adrian Davies (5); Pen: Adrian Davies (2)	Report	Pen: Mark McCall (2)

Cardiff Arms Park
Attendance: 3,600
Referee: Gérard Borreani

13 December 1995
19:00

Ulster (Ireland)	16–29	(France) Bègles-Bordeaux
Try: Andrew Matchett; Denis McBride; Pen: Mark McCall	Report	Try: Pascal Fauthoux; Philippe Bernat-Salles; Sebastien Loubsens; Julien Berthe; Con: Pascal Fauthoux; Julien Berthe

Ravenhill
Attendance: 2,500
Referee: Derek Bevan

=== Pool 3 ===
Team	P	W	D	L	Tries for	Tries against	Try diff	Points for	Points against	Points diff	Pts	Status
(Ireland) Leinster	2	2	0	0	4	3	1	47	43	4	4	Advanced to the semi-finals
(Wales) Pontypridd	2	1	0	1	2	2	0	53	35	18	2	Eliminated
(Italy) Milan	2	0	0	2	2	3	−1	33	55	−22	0	Eliminated

1 November 1995
14:30

Milan (Italy)	21–24	(Ireland) Leinster
Try: Roberto Crotti; Marco Platania; Con: Massimo Bonomi; Pen: Diego Dominguez		Try: Conor O'Shea; Niall Woods; Con: Alan McGowan; Pen: Alan McGowan (4)

Stadio Comunale Giuriati
Attendance: 1,200
Referee: Franck Maciello

22 November 1995
19:15

Pontypridd (Wales)	31–12	(Italy) Milan
Try: David Manley; Neil Jenkins; Pen: Neil Jenkins (8)		Pen: Diego Dominguez (4)

Sardis Road
Attendance: 4,500
Referee: Brian Campsall

6 December 1995
19:00

Leinster (Ireland)	23–22	(Wales) Pontypridd
Try: Conor O'Shea; Alan McGowan; Con: Alan McGowan (2); Pen: Alan McGowan		Try: Crispin Cormack; Con: Lee Jarvis; Pen: Lee Jarvis

Lansdowne Road
Attendance: 4,000
Referee: Daniel Gillet

=== Pool 4 ===
Team	P	W	D	L	Tries for	Tries against	Try diff	Points for	Points against	Points diff	Pts	Status
(Wales) Swansea	2	1	0	1	3	3	0	35	27	8	2	Advanced to the semi-finals
(Ireland) Munster	2	1	0	1	2	2	0	29	32	−3	2	Eliminated
(France) Castres	2	1	0	1	2	2	0	29	34	−5	2	Eliminated

1 November 1995
14:30

Munster (Ireland)	17–13	(Wales) Swansea
Try: Pat Murray; Richard Wallace; Con: Ken Smith; Pen: Ken Smith	Report	Try: Alan Harris; Con: Aled Williams; Pen: Aled Williams

Thomond Park
Attendance: 6,000
Referee: Ed Morrison

8 November 1995
20:00

Castres (France)	19–12	(Ireland) Munster
Try: Nicolas Combes; Con: Laurent Labit; Pen: Laurent Labit (4)	Report	Pen: Ken Smith (4)

Stade Antoine Beguere
Attendance: 6,500
Referee: David Davies

5 December 1995
19:00

Swansea (Wales)	22–10	(France) Castres
Try: Alan Harris; Garin Jenkins; Pen: Aled Williams (4)		Try: Francis Rui; Con: Cyril Savy; Pen: Cyril Savy

St Helen's
Attendance: 8,000
Referee: Chuck Muir

== Seeding ==
Seed	Pool Winners	Pts	TF	+/−
1	(France) Toulouse	4	8	+53
2	(Ireland) Leinster	4	4	+4
3	(Wales) Cardiff	3	7	+40
4	(Wales) Swansea	2	3	+8

== Knockout stage ==
Semi-finals
1	(France) Toulouse	30
4	(Wales) Swansea	3
2	(Ireland) Leinster	14
3	(Wales) Cardiff	23

Final
1	(France) Toulouse (a.e.t)	21
3	(Wales) Cardiff	18

=== Semi-finals ===
30 December 1995
13:30

Leinster (Ireland)	14–23	(Wales) Cardiff
Try: Pim m Pen: McGowan (3)	Report	Try: Hall c Taylor 50' c Con: Davies (2); Pen: Davies; Drop: Davies; Moore

Lansdowne Road, Dublin
Attendance: 7,350
Referee: Brian Campsall (England)

30 December 1995
14:00

Toulouse (France)	30–3	(Wales) Swansea
Try: Artiguste c Manent c Penalty try c Con: Deylaud (3); Pen: Deylaud (3)	Report	Pen: Williams

Stade des Sept Deniers, Toulouse
Attendance: 10,000
Referee: Jim Fleming (Scotland)

=== Final ===
The 1996 Heineken Cup Final was the final match of the 1995–96 Heineken Cup, the inaugural season of Europe's top club rugby union competition. The match was played on 6 January 1996 at the Arms Park in Cardiff. The match was contested by Cardiff of Wales and Toulouse of France. Toulouse won the match 21–18 after extra time; they took the lead with two tries in the first 10 minutes, but the kicking of Adrian Davies kept Cardiff level. With the scores at 15–12 as the clock ticked past 80 minutes, Davies stepped up again and slotted over a penalty to take the game to extra time. Christophe Deylaud restored Toulouse's lead with another penalty shortly after the game restarted, before Davies tied the scores up again. Then, going into the final few seconds of extra time, the referee penalised Cardiff for using hands in the ruck; Deylaud slotted the resulting penalty to seal Toulouse's victory.

==== Match details ====
7 January 1996
13:30

Cardiff (Wales)	18–21 (a.e.t.)	(France) Toulouse
Pen: Davies (6)	Report	Try: Castaignède; Cazalbou; Con: Deylaud; Pen: Deylaud (2); Drop: Castaignède

Cardiff Arms Park, Cardiff
Attendance: 21,800
Referee: David McHugh (Ireland)
