= Nicolas Bacqué =

French rugby union player (born 1973)

- Born: 17 December 1973 (age 52) Tarbes, France
- Height: 6 ft 3 in (191 cm)
- Weight: 202 lb (92 kg)

Rugby union career
- Position: Flanker
International career
Years	Team	Apps	(Points)
1997	France	1	(0)

Nicolas Bacqué (born 17 December 1973) is a French former professional rugby union player.

Born in Tarbes, Bacqué played as a flanker and started his career at Stade Toulousain. He was an unused substitute in Stade Toulousain's 1996 Heineken Cup final win over Cardiff. A France call up followed in 1997 and he was capped against Romania in a home Test at Lourdes. He next played with Section Paloise, which he helped win the 1999–2000 European Challenge Cup title, with two tries in the final against Castres Olympique.

== See also ==
- List of France national rugby union players
