= Robert Bru =

French rugby union coach (1931–2020)

- Born: 30 January 1931 Salles-d'Aude, France
- Died: 9 May 2020 (aged 89) Salles-d'Aude, France

Rugby union career
Coaching career
- Years: Team
- 1980–1983: Stade Toulousain
- 1990–1992: RC Narbonne

Robert Bru (30 January 1931 – 9 May 2020) was a French rugby union coach.

== Biography ==
Bru coached Stade Toulousain from 1980 to 1983 alongside Christian Gajan and Pierre Villepreux. He worked on screening and training young players within the club, and helped with the establishment of the Centre de formation du Stade toulousain in 1988. Very devoted to teaching, his intricate style of instruction was passed down to his successors, Villepreux and Jean-Claude Skrela. Bru became technical director of the club, serving from 1984 to 1989.

After he left Stade Toulousain, Bru served as head coach of RC Narbonne from 1990 to 1992. With Bru at the helm, the club won the Challenge Yves du Manoir. He also directed the rugby concentration in sports studies at Paul Sabatier University in Toulouse.

Robert Bru died of natural causes on 9 May 2020 in Salles d'Aude at the age of 89.
