= Alain Penaud =

France international rugby union player (born 1969)

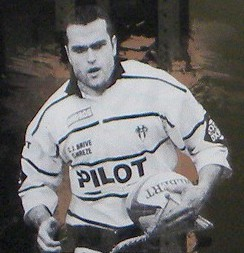
- Born: 19 July 1969 (age 57) Juillac, France
- Height: 1.82 m (5 ft 11 1/2 in)
- Weight: 88 kg (194 lb)
- Notable relative: Damian Penaud (son)
- Occupation: CCO of Andros

Rugby union career
- Position: Fly-half
Youth career
- 1982–1985: Juillac-Objat
- 1985–1987: Brive
Amateur team(s)
Years	Team	Apps	(Points)
1987–1995	Brive		
Senior career
Years	Team	Apps	(Points)
1995–1998	Brive		
1998–1999	Saracens	24	(66)
1999–2001	Toulouse	13	(30)
2001–2005	Brive		
2005	Lyon	1	(0)
2005–2006	Stade Français	20	(19)
2006–2007	Lyon	24	(8)
International career
Years	Team	Apps	(Points)
1992–2000	France	32	(62)
Coaching career
- Years: Team
- 2005: Lyon (backs coach)
- 2006–2007: Lyon (backs coach)

Alain Penaud (born 19 July 1969) is a French former rugby union player who held the position of fly-half.

He was known for his vision of the game, his audacity and his ball carrying and played mainly for Brive, where he scored 449 points within 334 games all in all and won the Heineken Cup in 1997. Penaud is widely acknowledged as one of the best Brive players of all time. He later won French Rugby Union Championship (named at that time Élite 1) with Toulouse in 2001.

He was selected 32 times for the French national team and won the 1997 Five Nations Championship clinching a Grand Slam. His international career was restricted due to his strong personality and the tactical choices of many coaches. He has indeed never been selected for a World Cup, even though his career has covered five tournaments.

His son is French rugby union international Damian Penaud.

== Biography ==
Alain Penaud was born on 19 July 1969 in Juillac, Corrèze. He started rugby for his hometown club US Juillac-Objat, near Brive-la-Gaillarde, at the age of 13 and then moved to Brive three years later. He began to be a regular starter for Brive first-team in the late 1980s and the early 1990s. Alongside Sébastien Carrat, Christophe Lamaison, David Venditti and Sebastien Viars, he formed a formidable back line. He reached the 1995–96 French Rugby Union Championship (named at that time Groupe A) final but lost against Toulouse, and is remembered for captaining the team in winning the Heineken Cup in 1997 against Leicester Tigers and featured in the final the following year against Bath. His first start for France came against Wales in 1992. Penaud has been in and out of the side for France, though still appeared in the 1997 Grand Slam win, including a last-minute victory against England at Twickenham. After a defeat in Brisbane in the summer of 1997, he left the national team, missing the 1999 World Cup.

He moved to Saracens for the 1998–99 Allied Dunbar Premiership season to replace Michael Lynagh, and scored a try on his debut against Northampton Saints. He scored 66 points within 24 games for Sarries. Despite a three-year contract, he spent only one season across the channel (finishing 3rd in the league), preferring, for family reasons to return to France at Toulouse, where he won 2000–01 Élite 1. Producing two excellent seasons, Penaud was recalled to the France squad for the 2000 Six Nations.

He then returned to Brive when the club was playing in the second division. He helped them to promotion for the 2003–04 season. He left the club in 2005, after scoring 449 points within 334 games including 263 championship ones, and signed for Lyon as player-coach. Despite his age, he surprised many by becoming one of the best players in the league. He then moved to Stade Français in 2005, lasting only one season.

In 2006–07, he returned to honour his contract as player-coach with Lyon in Pro D2. His last dance was tumultuous, as he received a suspension for 30 days for insulting a referee during a match against Limoges. Penaud retired at the end of the season, after a 20-year elite career.

== Personal life ==
He is the father of another French international, Damian Penaud.

He currently works as chief commercial officer of Andros.

== Honours ==
=== Brive ===
- Heineken Cup: 1996–97
- Heineken Cup runner-up: 1997–98
- Groupe A runner-up: 1995–96
- Challenge Yves du Manoir: 1996

=== Toulouse ===
- Élite 1: 2000–01

=== France ===
- Five Nations Championship: 1997 (Grand Slam)
- Five Nations Championship/Six Nations Championship runner-up: 1992, 2000

== Statistics ==
=== Club statistics ===
Club	Years	Points
(France) Brive	1987–1995; 2001–2005	449
(England) Saracens	1998–1999	66
(France) Toulouse	1999–2001	30
(France) Lyon	2005; 2006–2007	8
(France) Stade Français	2005–2006	19

=== International statistics ===
National team	Caps	Tries	Drop goals	Total
France	32	10	5	62

==== International tries ====
Try	Opposing team	Location	Venue	Competition	Date	Result	Score
1	England	Paris, France	Parc des Princes	1992 Five Nations Championship	15 February 1992	Loss	13 – 31
2	Ireland	Paris, France	Parc des Princes	1992 Five Nations Championship	21 March 1992	Win	44 – 12
3	Ireland	Paris, France	Parc des Princes	1992 Five Nations Championship	21 March 1992	Win	44 – 12
4	South Africa	Lyon, France	Stade de Gerland	1992 South Africa rugby union tour of France and England	17 October 1992	Loss	15 – 20
5	South Africa	Lyon, France	Stade de Gerland	1992 South Africa rugby union tour of France and England	17 October 1992	Loss	15 – 20
6	South Africa	Paris, France	Parc des Princes	1992 South Africa rugby union tour of France and England	24 October 1992	Win	29 – 16
7	Romania	Aurillac, France	Stade Jean Alric	Test match	20 April 1996	Win	64 – 12
8	Romania	Bucharest, Romania	Stadionul Dinamo	Test match	1 June 1997	Win	51 – 20
9	Italy	Saint-Denis, France	Stade de France	2000 Six Nations Championship	1 April 2000	Win	42 – 31
10	Italy	Saint-Denis, France	Stade de France	2000 Six Nations Championship	1 April 2000	Win	42 – 31
