= Claude Portolan =

France international rugby union player

- Born: 16 December 1960 (age 65) Auterive, Haute-Garonne, France
- Height: 6 ft 0 in (183 cm)
- Weight: 246 lb (112 kg)

Rugby union career
- Position: Prop
International career
Years	Team	Apps	(Points)
1986–89	France	3	(0)

Claude Portolan (born 16 December 1960) is a French former international rugby union player.

A product of hometown club SA Auterive, Portolan was a prop and spent all but one season of his senior career with Stade Toulousain, playing 358 games. He featured in six Brennus Shield titles and was a member of the side that won the 1995–96 Heineken Cup. His brother, Gérard, was a teammate at Stade Toulousain.

Portolan gained three France caps during his career, debuting against the Wallabies in Sydney on their 1986 tour of Australia, before returning for two matches in the 1989 Five Nations.

== See also ==
- List of France national rugby union players
