= David Berty =

France international rugby union & wheelchair rugby league player

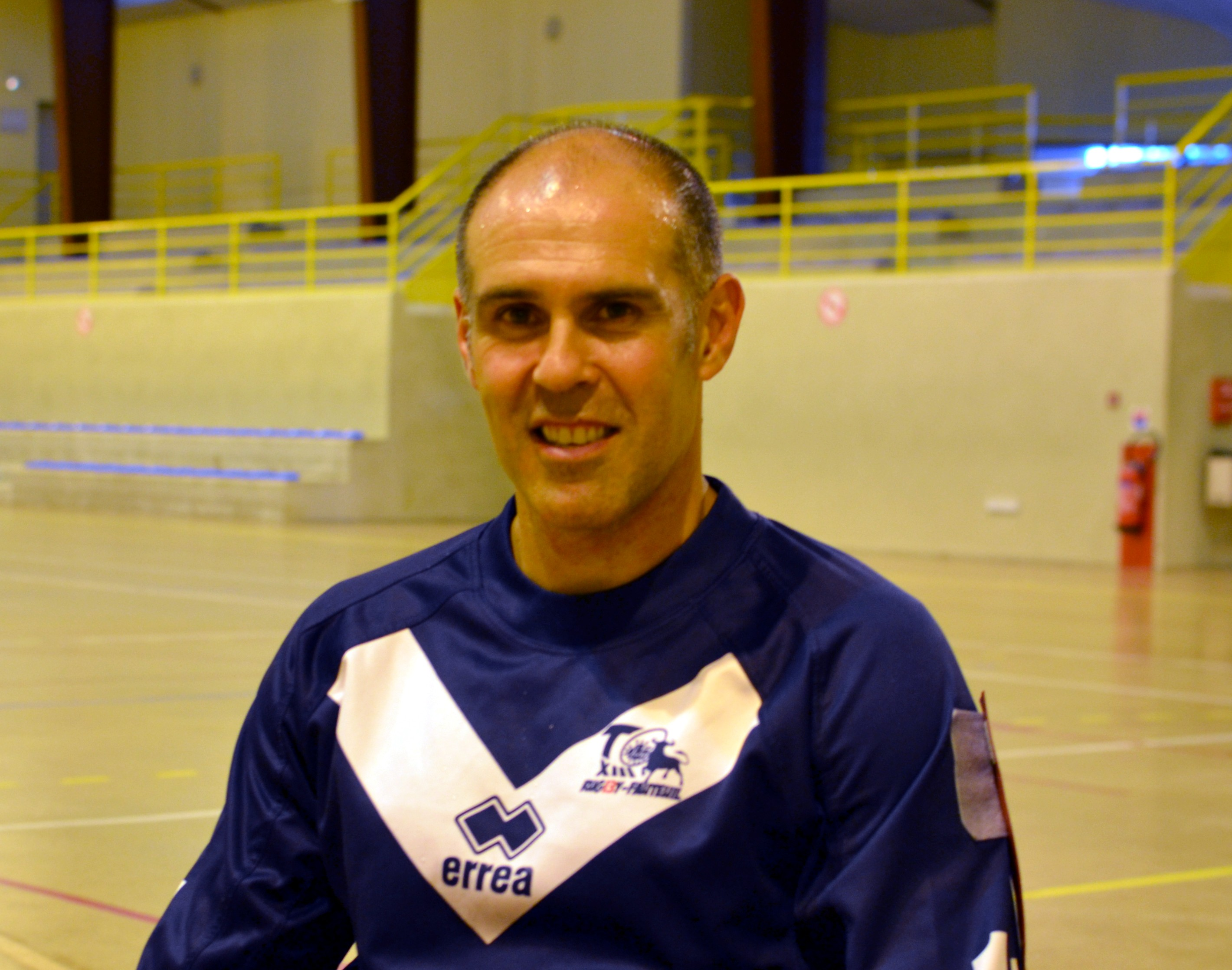

Personal information
- Born: 11 June 1970 (age 56) Toulouse, France
- Height: 5 ft 11 in (1.80 m)
- Weight: 177 lb (80 kg)

Playing information

Rugby union
- Position: Wing
Representative
Years	Team	Pld	T	G	FG	P
1990–96	France	6				0

Rugby league
Representative
Years	Team	Pld	T	G	FG	P
2022	Spain Wheelchair	3	3	0	0	12

David Berty (born 11 June 1970) is a French former international rugby union player and a wheelchair rugby league player.

A native of Toulouse, Berty was a winger and gained six France caps during the 1990s, debuting in a home Test against the All Blacks. He also represented France at the 1993 Rugby World Cup Sevens.

Berty won five Brennus Shields playing with Stade Toulousain and was the top try-scorer in the 1993–94 French Championship. He played in Stade Toulousain's 1995–96 Heineken Cup title-winning side.

In 2002, Berty was diagnosed with multiple sclerosis, a condition that has left him unable to walk.

Berty switched to playing wheelchair rugby league and joined Toulouse–St Jory. In 2022, he was selected to represent Spain at the 2021 Wheelchair Rugby League World Cup. In the opening match of the tournament, Berty scored a hat-trick to help Spain win 55–33 against Ireland.

== See also ==
- List of France national rugby union players
