= Sébastien Loubsens =

Spain international rugby union player

- Born: 15 February 1973 (age 53) France
- Height: 5 ft 11 in (1.80 m)
- Weight: 184 lb (83 kg)

Rugby union career
- Position: Centre
Amateur team(s)
Years	Team	Apps	(Points)
1990-1994	Stade Montois		
Senior career
Years	Team	Apps	(Points)
1994-2001	Bordeaux-Bègles		
2001-2003	Stade Montois		
2004	Bordeaux-Bègles		
2005	US Oyonnax		
2006-2007	Stade Montois		
2007-2008	Grenade Sur l'Adour		
2008-2009	CAPBRETON		
International career
Years	Team	Apps	(Points)
1999-2005	Spain	19	(25)

Sébastien Loubsens (born 15 February 1973) is a French-born former Spanish rugby union player. He played as a centre.

== Career ==
He evoluted to the highest level in Club athlétique Bordeaux-Bègles Gironde and ended his professional career on 2008, playing for Grenade Sur l'Adour. Currently he works as rugby pundit for Top 14 for Canal+.

== International career ==
Before joining the Spain national team, he had several caps with France A and France 7s. He debuted for Spain in 1999, during a test match against Japan at Tokyo, on 20 August 1999. He was part of the 1999 Rugby World Cup roster, where he played the first two matches for Spain. His last cap was against Andorra, at Andorra La Vella on 13 February 2005.
