= Jean Fabre (rugby union) =

French rugby union player (born 1935)

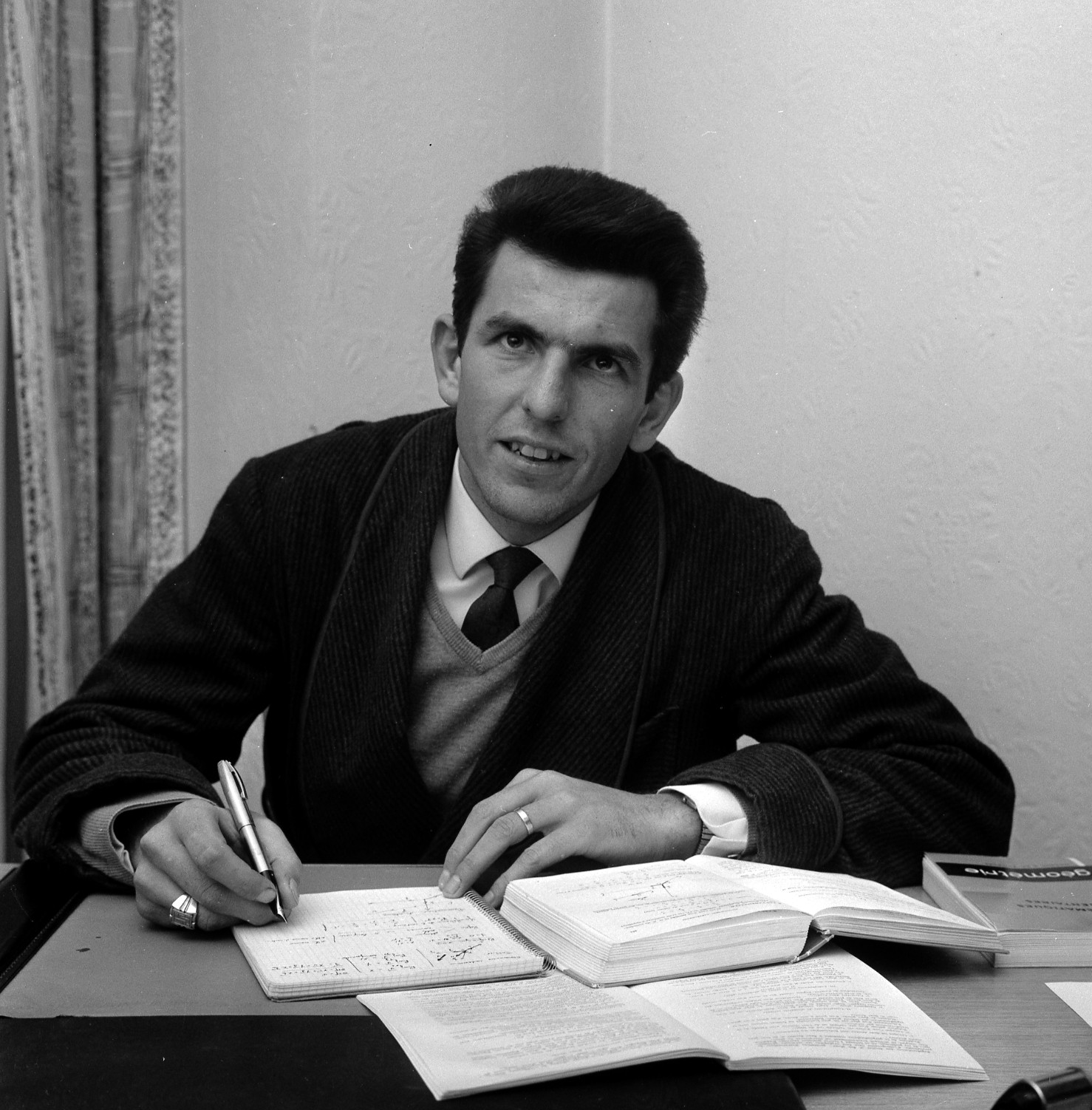
- Born: 7 November 1935 (age 91) Rodez, France
- Height: 6 ft 1 in (1.85 m)
- Weight: 203 lb (92 kg)

Rugby union career
- Position: Flanker
Senior career
Years	Team	Apps	(Points)
1956-1968	Stade Toulousain		
International career
Years	Team	Apps	(Points)
1963-1964	France	8	(0)

Jean Fabre (born Rodez, 7 November 1935) is a former French rugby union player. He played as a flanker.

He played for Stade Toulousain. He earned his first cap with the French national team on 11 November 1962 against Romania at Bucharest. In 1964 he became captain of French national team. After his player career he became president of Stade Toulousain during the 1980s.
