= Richard Castel =

France international rugby union player (born 1972)

- Born: Richard Castel; December 31, 1972 (age 53) Vendres, France
- Height: 1.85 m (6 ft 1 in)
- Weight: 99 kg (218 lb)
- Occupation: Rugby union coach

Rugby union career
- Position: Coach
- Current team: RC Narbonne
Senior career
| Years | Team | Apps | (Points) |
| 1988-1996 | Toulouse | | |
| 1996-2003 | Béziers | | |
International career
| Years | Team | Apps | (Points) |
| 1996-1999 | France | 15 | |
Coaching career
- Years: Team
- 2007-2008: Béziers
- 2009-: RC Narbonne

Richard Castel (born 31 December 1972, in Vendres) is a former French rugby union player. He played as a Flanker.

Castel played for Stade Toulousain from 1982/83 to 1992/93, where he won 2 titles of the French Championship, in 1994/95 and 1995/96 and a Heineken Cup, in 1995/96. He then moved to Béziers in 1996.

== Honours ==
- Grand Slam : 1997
- French rugby champion, 1995, 1996 with Stade Toulousain
