= Adrian Davies =

Welsh rugby union player

- Born: 9 February 1969 (age 57) Bridgend, Wales
- Height: 1.75 m (5 ft 9 in)
- Weight: 76 kg (12 st 0 lb)
- University: Cambridge University
- Occupation: Chartered Surveyor

Rugby union career
- Position: Fly-half
International career
Years	Team	Apps	(Points)
1990–1995	Wales	9	

Adrian Davies (born 9 February 1969 in Bridgend) is a former Wales international rugby union player. A fly-half, he played for Wales in the 1991 and 1995 Rugby World Cup finals. He played club rugby for Neath RFC, Cardiff RFC and Richmond RFC
