= Ugo Mola =

French rugby union player and coach (born 1973)

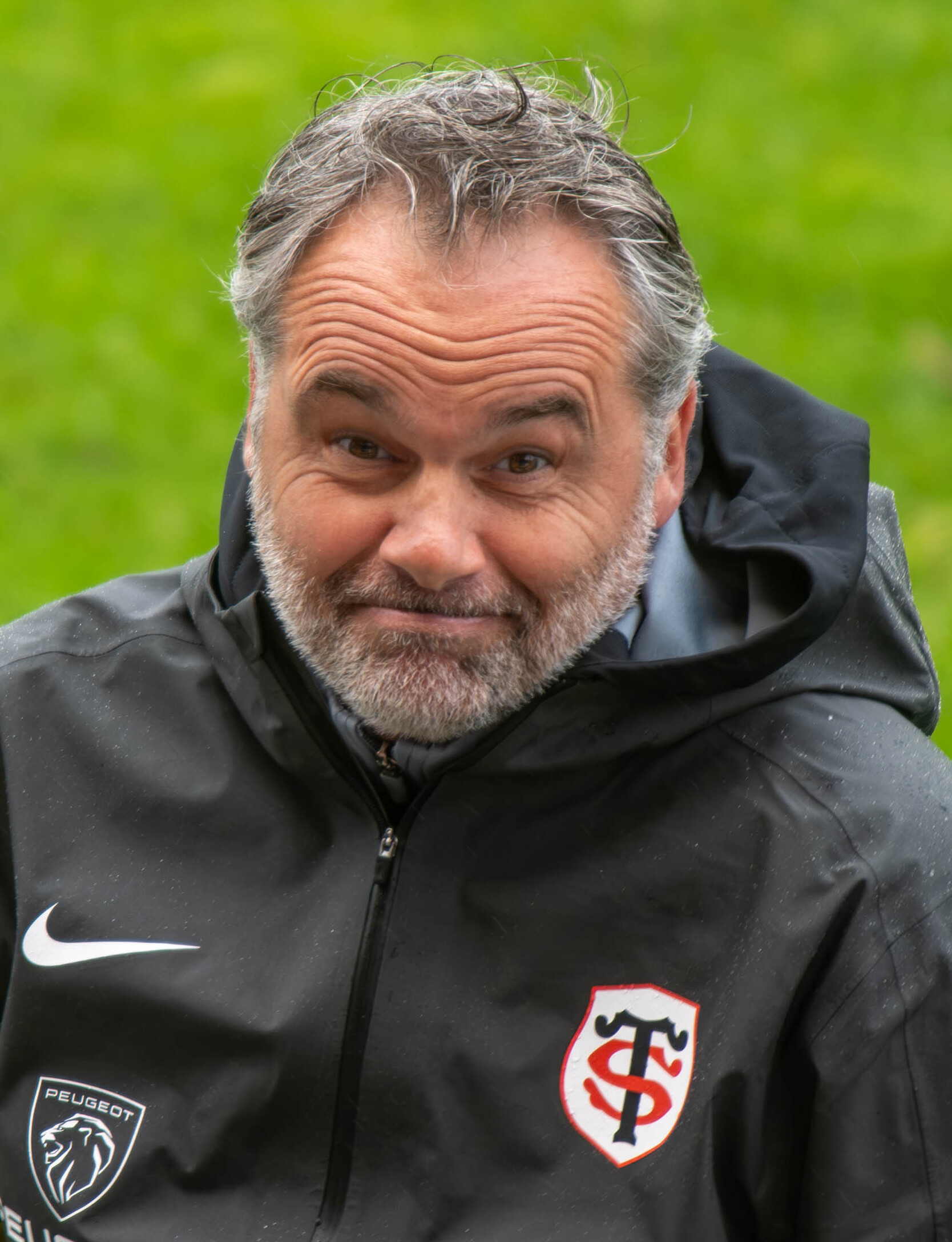
- Mola with Toulouse in 2025
- Born: Ugo Mola; 14 May 1973 (age 53) Sainte-Foy-la-Grande, France
- Height: 1.83 m (6 ft 0 in)

Rugby union career
- Position(s): Wing, Fullback
Amateur team(s)
Years	Team	Apps	(Points)
- Stade Foyen
–	Blagnac		
–	Toulouse		
Senior career
Years	Team	Apps	(Points)
1990–1996	Toulouse		
1996–1997	Dax		
1997–2005	Castres		
International career
Years	Team	Apps	(Points)
1997–1999	France	12	(30)
Coaching career
- Years: Team
- 2005–2006: Mazamet
- 2006–2007: Castres
- 2008–2012: Brive
- 2014–2015: Albi
- 2015–: Toulouse

Ugo Mola (born 14 May 1973) is a French rugby union player and coach. He is currently the head coach of Top 14 club Stade Toulousain.

== Career ==
Mola played on the wing. He played for Toulouse (including winning the Heineken Champions Cup and the Top 14) between 1990 and 1996, and then for Dax and Castres before retiring as a player in 2005.

He made twelve appearances for France during his career, between 1997 and 1999. He scored 6 tries, including a hat-trick of tries against Namibia in the 1999 Rugby World Cup.

== Coaching career ==
Mola coached at Castres in 2006, and then at club side SC Mazamet. Between 2008 and 2012 he worked with Brive alongside the likes of Laurent Seigne and Christophe Laussucq.

Mola became Head coach of Stade Toulousain in the summer of 2015. Following the departure of Guy Novès, manager of Stade Toulouse since 1993, Mola was hired to replace Noves at the club in 2018. After finishing 12th in the TOP14, Toulouse recruited players including Antoine Dupont, Charlie Faumuina, Zack Holmes and Cheslin Kolbe. Mola claimed his first title as the Toulouse head coach winning the 2018/19 TOP14.

=== Coaching style ===
Mola coaches an off-loading, carefree approach, and sees achievement as a long-term project. He has emphasised a family atmosphere at the club, and the presence of young leaders and experienced players.
