= Stade Toulousain =

French rugby union club, based in Toulouse

- Full name: Stade Toulousain
- Nickname(s): Le Stade; Les Rouge et Noir (The Red and Blacks)
- Founded: 1907; 119 years ago
- Location: Toulouse, France
- Ground: Stade Ernest-Wallon (Capacity: 19,500)
- President: Didier Lacroix
- Coach: Ugo Mola
- Captain: Julien Marchand
- Most appearances: Jean Bouilhou (392)
- Top scorer: Thomas Ramos (1,986)
- Most tries: Vincent Clerc (134)
- League: Top 14
- 2024–25: 1st
1st kit	2nd kit	3rd kit

Official website
- www.stadetoulousain.fr

Stade Toulousain (French: Stade toulousain; French pronunciation: [stad tuluzɛ̃]; Occitan: Estadi Tolosenc), also referred to as Toulouse, is a professional rugby union club based in Toulouse, France. They compete in the Top 14, France's top division of rugby, and the European Rugby Champions Cup.

Toulouse is the most successful club in Europe, having won the Heineken Cup/European Rugby Champions Cup a record six times – in 1996, 2003, 2005, 2010, 2021 and 2024. They were also runners-up in 2004 and 2008 against London Wasps and Munster, respectively. Stade Toulousain have also won a record 25 Boucliers de Brennus, the French domestic league trophy. It is traditionally one of the main providers for the French national team and its youth academy is one of the best in the world. Stade Toulousain also have the biggest fan base in Europe, and the biggest social media and brand presence of any non-national rugby team across both league and union.

Their home ground is the Stade Ernest-Wallon. However, big Top 14 matches along with European games are often played at the Stadium Municipal de Toulouse. The club colours are red, black and white.

== History ==
=== Roots and foundation ===
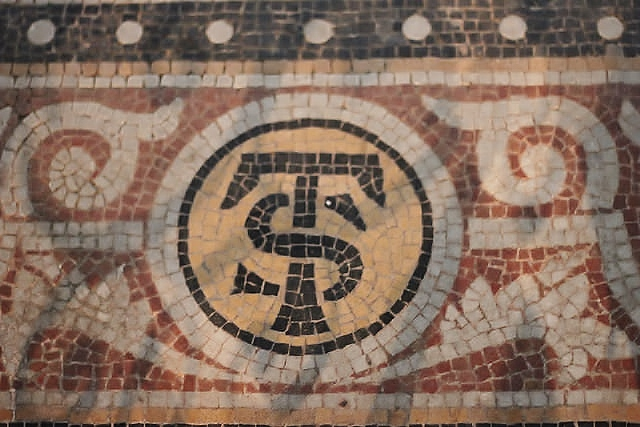
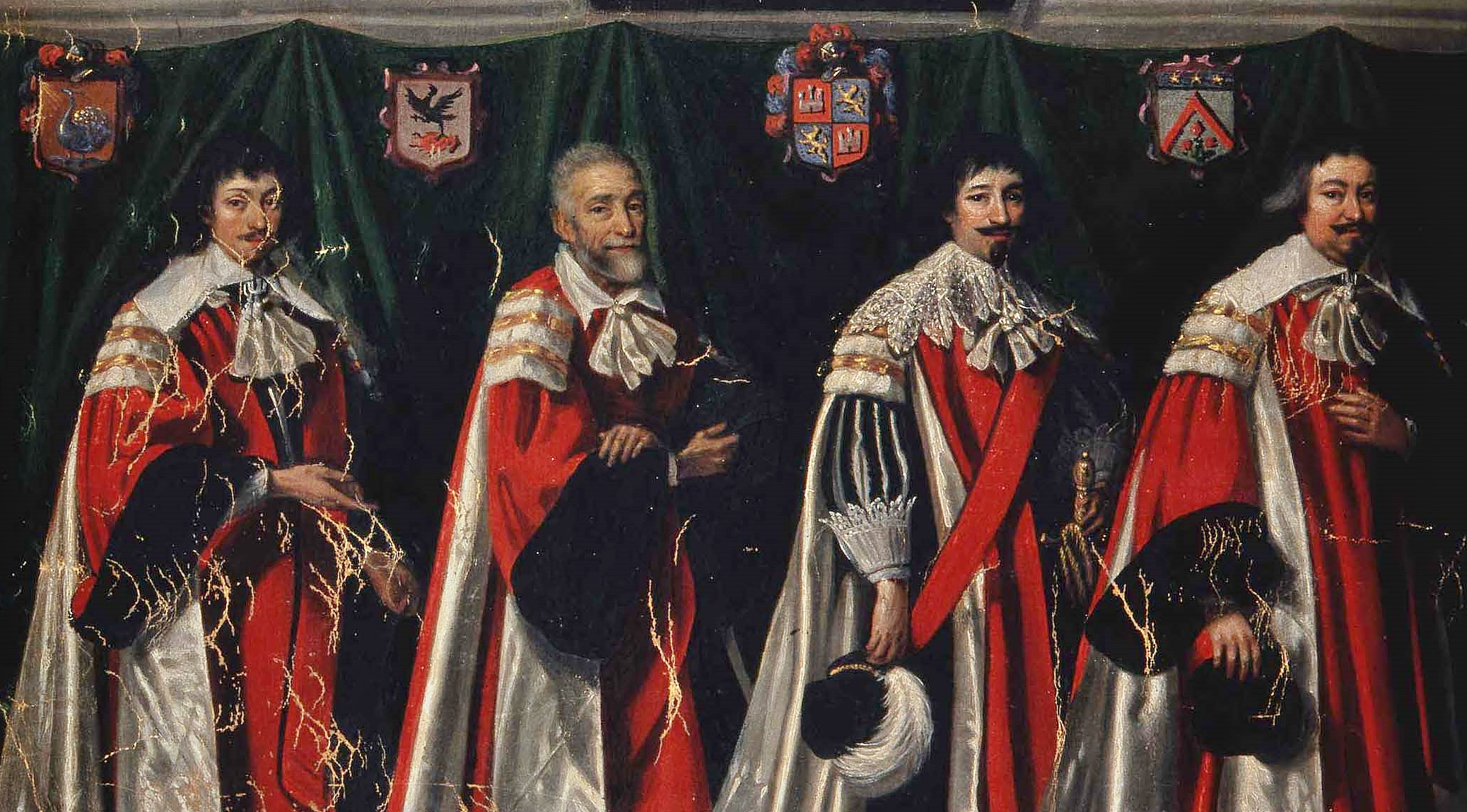
The logo of Thomas Aquinas (left) in the Basilica of Saint-Sernin and The ceremonial red and black colours worn by the Capitouls (right) influenced the crest and colours of the club respectively.

Before 1907, rugby union in Toulouse was only played in schools or universities. In 1893, students of secondary school "Lycée de Toulouse" got together in a new team "Les Sans-Soucis". Once attending university, the same students founded "l'Olympique Toulousain", which became "Stade Olympien des Étudiants de Toulouse" (SOET) a few years later in 1896. In the same period, 'non-students' grouped in "le Sport Athlétique Toulousain" (SAT) while students of the veterinary school created "l'Union Sportive de l'École Vétérinaire" (USEV). Both entities merged in 1905 and called themselves "Véto-Sport". Finally in 1907, Stade Toulousain was founded resulting from a union between the SOET and Véto-Sport.

Since its creation in 1907, Stade Toulousain drew on the past of the city. The design of Stade Toulousain's crest refers to the initials of Thomas Aquinas (transl. Saint Thomas in French ; S and T, same as the club's name) whose bones rest in the Church of the Jacobins, in Toulouse. The interlaced letters came from a famous tiled floor of the Basilica of Saint-Sernin, where the relics were temporarily moved for almost two centuries after the French Revolution. The historical colours, red and black, are rooted in the ceremonial costume of the capitouls of Toulouse. A municipal body created in 1147, the capitouls were until the French Revolution the consuls of the city. Their traditional costume was red and black (with white bands), as shown in the oldest portraits dating from the 14th century.

=== Early years ===
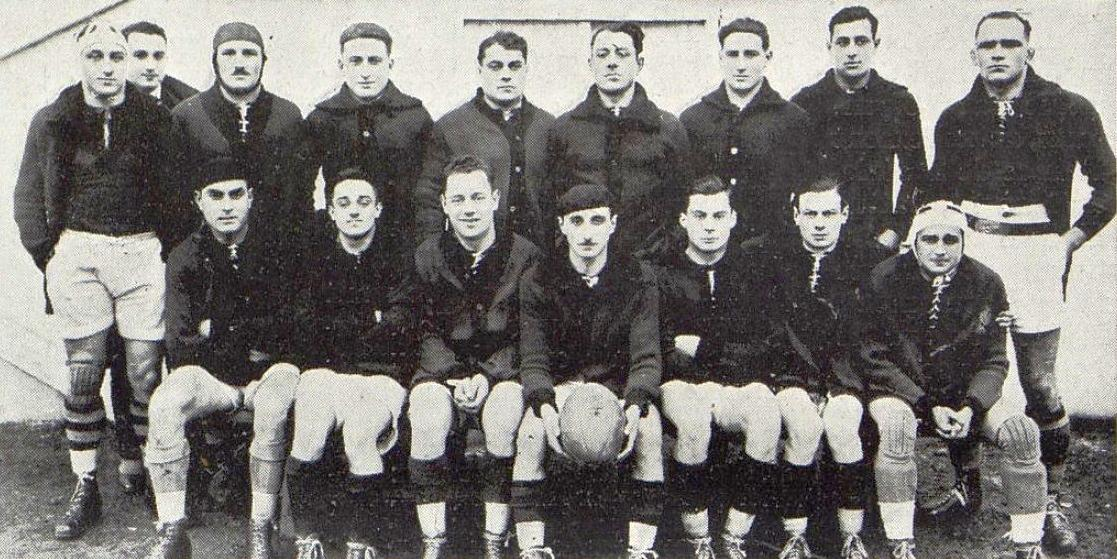
The 1927 champion team.

Stade Toulousain played its first final of the national title French Championship in 1909 and lost it to Stade Bordelais Université Club (17–0) in Toulouse. In 1912 Stade Toulousain won its first national title. It had to wait until 1922 before it won its second. However, the 1920s were a golden era for the club. Their first final action in the 1920s was in 1921, when they were defeated by USA Perpignan. Despite losing in 1921, the side went on to win the 1922, 1923, 1924, 1926 and 1927 championships.

=== 1930s to 1950s ===
The following decades were relatively quiet after such a dominant era during the 1920s. Stade Toulousain would not make it to any grand finals during the 1930s, and it would not be until the late 1940s when they would return. However, they did contest the Challenge Yves du Manoir with RC Toulon in 1934, though it ended in a nil-all tie and both teams were declared winners. The club made it to the final of the 1947 championship, and claimed the premiership, beating SU Agen, 10 to 3. However, no such championships followed, the club was again relatively quiet on the championship. It was 22 years in the waiting; Toulouse made it to the final, but were defeated by the CA Bègles club.

=== 1970s to 1980s ===
In 1971, Toulouse contested the Challenge Yves du Manoir against US Dax, losing 18 to 8. Eleven years after the CA Bègles defeat, the club was again disappointed in the final, being defeated by AS Béziers in the championship game of 1980. However, the latter end of the decade was reminiscent of the 1920s sides. Toulouse were again contesting the Challenge Yves du Manoir for the 1984 season, though they lost to RC Narbonne 17 to 3. However, they didclaim their first championship since 1947, defeating RC Toulon in the 1985 final. The following season saw them successfully defend their championship, defeating SU Agen in the final. After a number of defeats in the Challenge Yves du Manoir finals, Toulouse defeated US Dax to win the 1988 competition. Both Toulon and Agen won the following premierships (1987 and 1988) but Toulouse won another championship in 1989.

=== 1990s to present ===
The dominance continued in the 1990s, starting with a grand final loss in 1991, and a Challenge Yves du Manoir championship in 1993, defeating Castres 13 to 8 in the final. The mid-1990s saw Stade Toulousain become a major force yet again, as the club claimed four premierships in a row, winning the championship in 1994, 1995, 1996 and 1997, as well as the Challenge Yves du Manoir in 1995. The club emulated its success in the European Rugby Cup, becoming the first ever champions in the 1995–96 season.

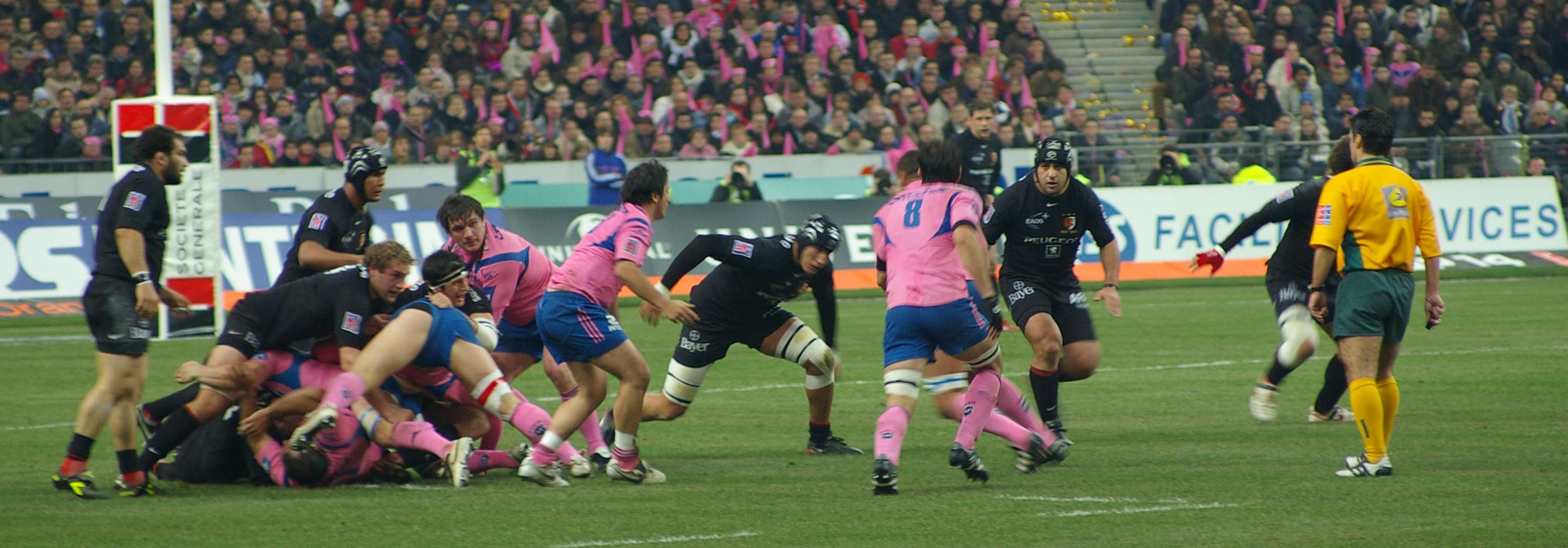
Stade Français v Stade toulousain. Stade de France, Paris, 27 January 2007.

The late 1990s and the 2000s saw the club again reach great heights. The club won the Challenge Yves du Manoir in 1998, defeating Stade Français Paris, the 1999 championship as well as the 2001 championship. They also were runners-up in the 2003 season, losing to Stade Français in the final. As the club had done in the mid-1990s, Stade Toulousain replicated this success in the European Rugby Cup, winning the 2002–03 and the 2004–05 cups. The club made it to the final of the 2005-06 Top 14, and despite only trailing Biarritz 9–6 at half time, Toulouse could not prevent a second-half whitewash, eventually going down 40–13. They ended their seven-year title drought with a 26–20 win over ASM Clermont Auvergne on 28 June 2008. In 2008 they narrowly lost a Heineken Cup Final to Munster by 3 points. In 2010 Toulouse defeated Leinster to reach the final where they faced Biarritz Olympique at Stade de France in Paris on Saturday 22 May 2010. Toulouse won the game by 21–19 to claim their fourth Heineken Cup title, making them the first club to win the title four times. Stade Toulousain is also the only French club to have taken part in all the editions of Heineken Cup since its creation (17, with the 2011–12 season). They won the French championship in 2011 against Montpellier (15–10) and 2012 against Toulon (18–12). Stade Toulousain reached the semi-finals of the French championship 20 consecutive years (from 1994 to 2013). In 2019, Toulouse came back to victory, earning a 20th French Rugby Union Championship title before making an historic double, winning the 2021 Champions Cup and the 2021 Top 14. Their latest title is the 2023 French championship earned against La Rochelle, teams were ranked respectively first and second of the regular season 2023.

They won the champions cup for the 6th time after beating Leinster 31–22 at the Tottenham Hotspur stadium and as a result became the highest ranked team in Europe

== Stadium ==
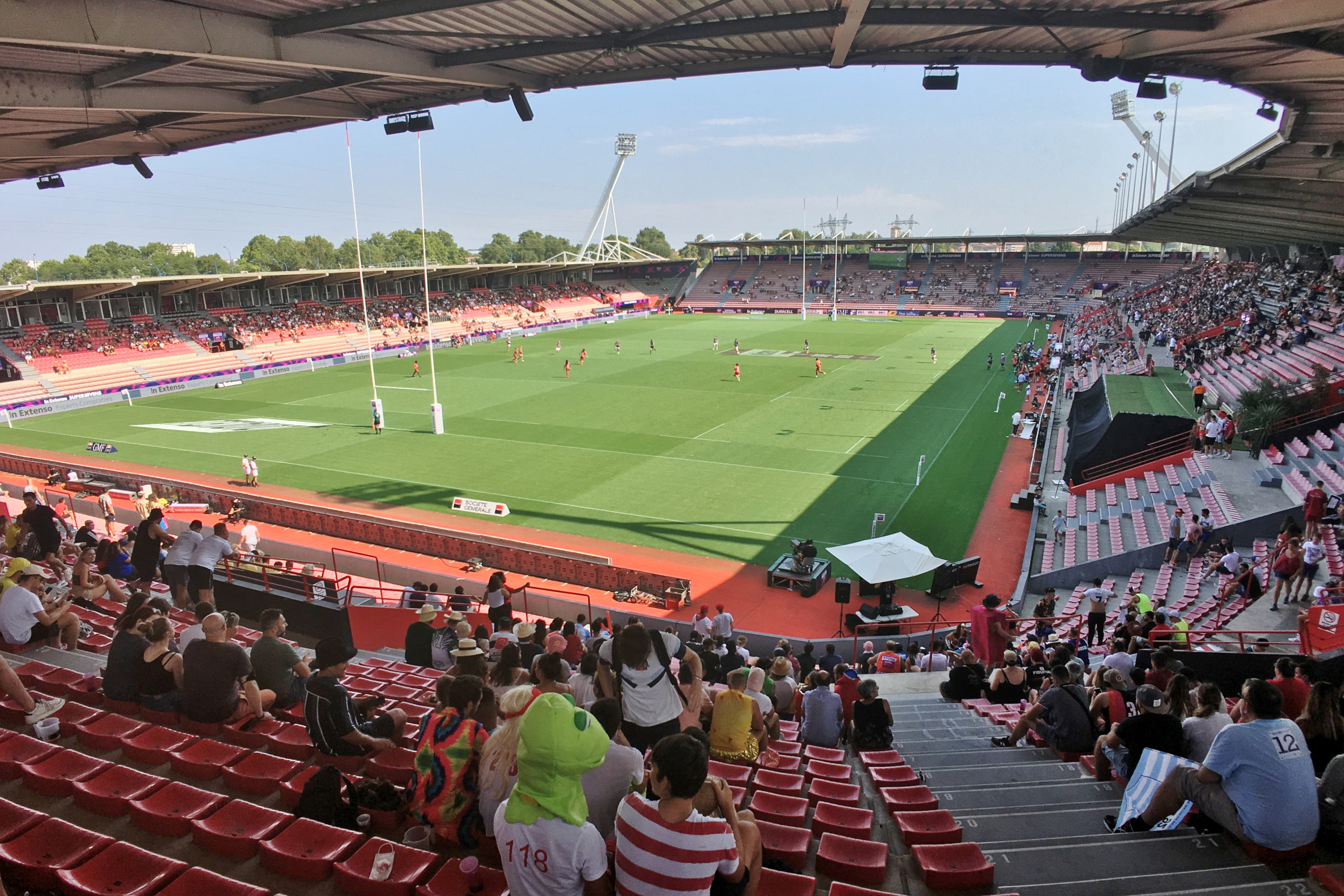
Stade Ernest-Wallon

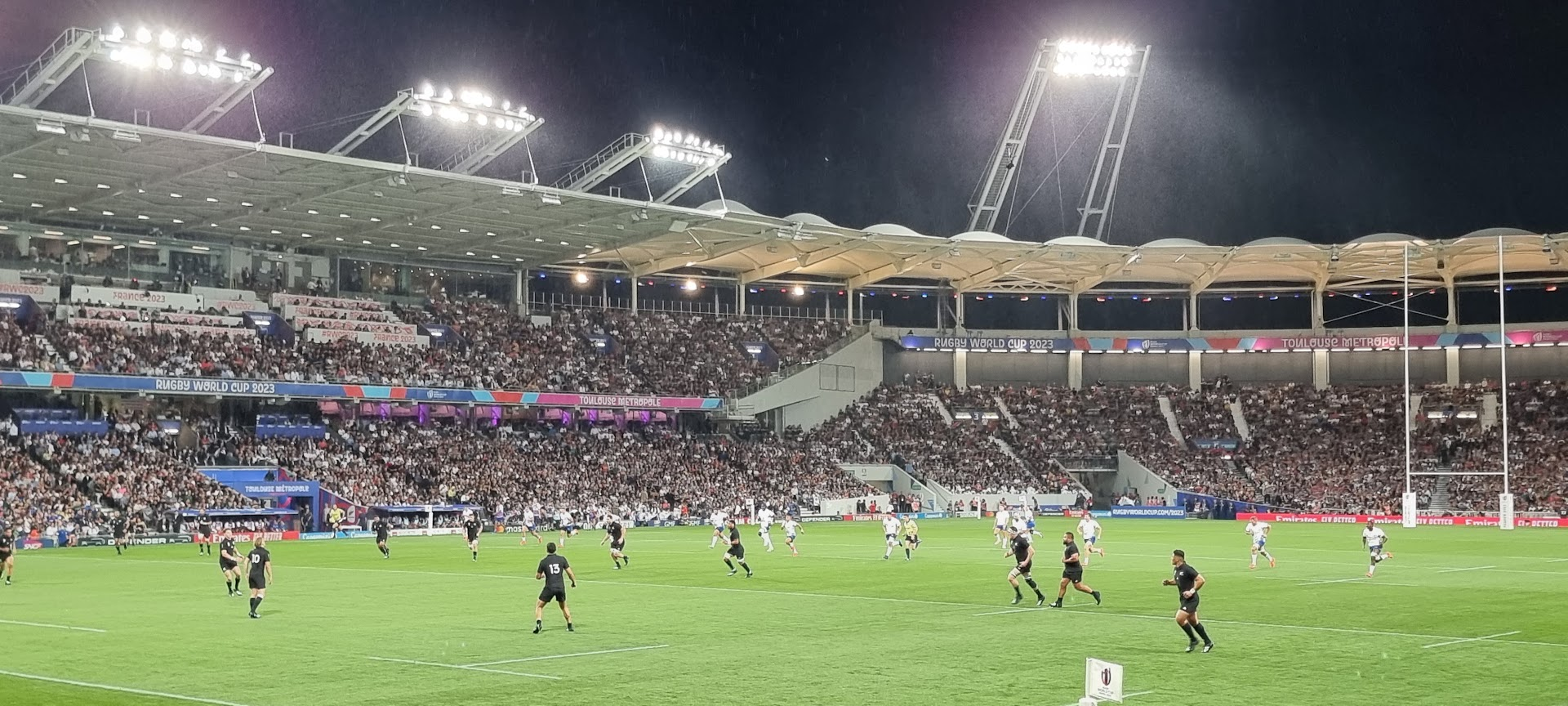
Stadium de Toulouse

Toulouse play their home games at the Stade Ernest-Wallon, which was built in the late 1980s and was recently renovated. It has a capacity of 19,500. Stade Toulousain is one of the rare teams, in France and especially in rugby union, that own its stadium. Since February 2020, it has also been home to rugby league team Toulouse Olympique, which currently competes in Super League (the top flight in British rugby league), following negotiations and an agreement between both executive boards.

The stadium however cannot always accommodate all the Toulouse fans. For the larger fixtures, such as championship or Champions Cup games or play-offs, the fixture may be moved to Stadium de Toulouse, which has more capacity, 33,150. The stadium was used for numerous matches at the 2007 and 2023 Rugby World Cups.

== Honours ==
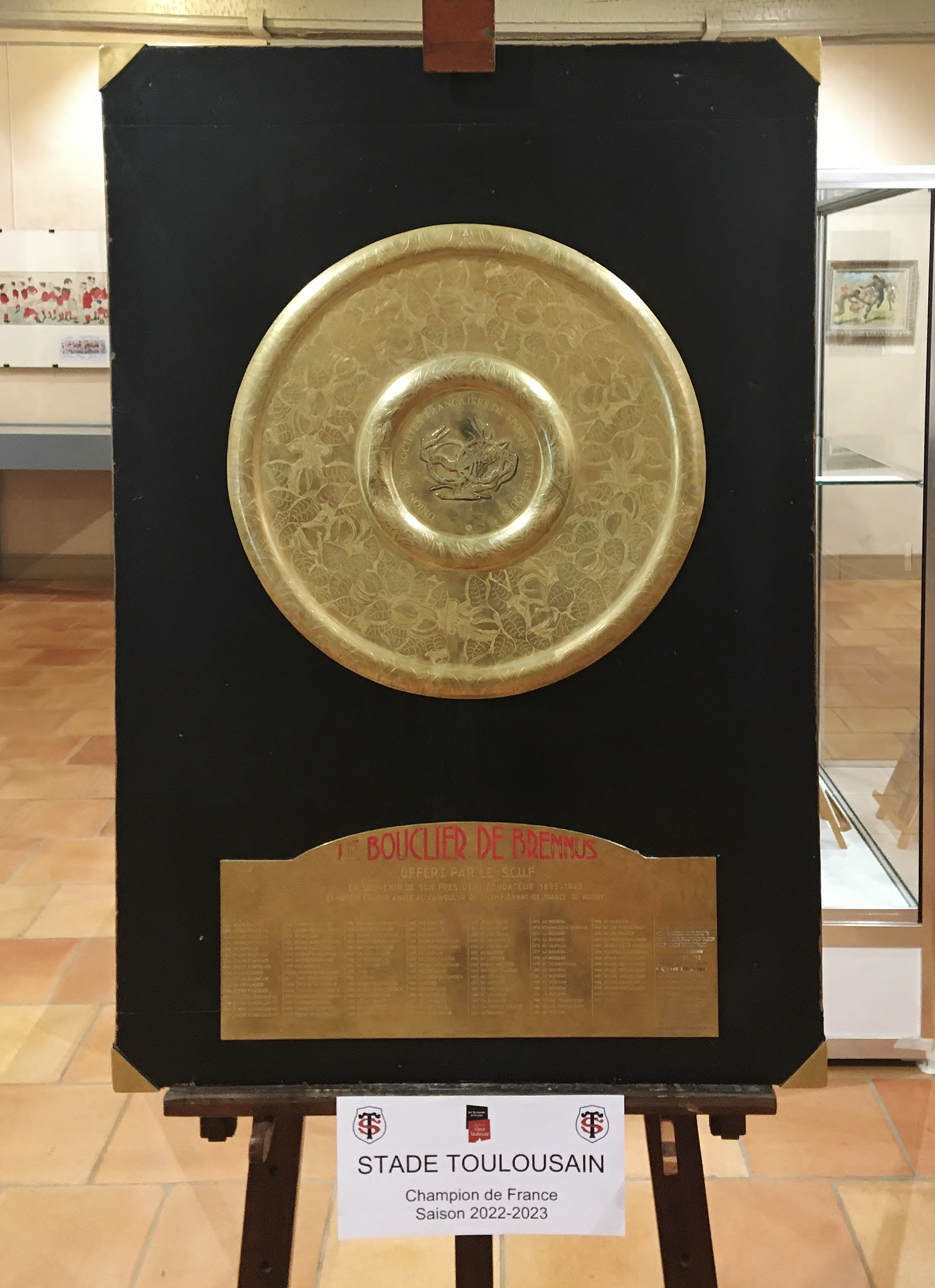
The Brennus Shield, the trophy awarded to the French champion.

- Heineken Cup / European Rugby Champions Cup
  - Champions (6): 1996, 2003, 2005, 2010, 2021, 2024
  - Runners-up (2): 2004, 2008
- French championship Top 14
  - Champions (25): 1912, 1922, 1923, 1924, 1926, 1927, 1947, 1985, 1986, 1989, 1994, 1995, 1996, 1997, 1999, 2001, 2008, 2011, 2012, 2019, 2021, 2023, 2024, 2025, 2026
  - Runners-up (7): 1903, 1909, 1921, 1969, 1980, 1991, 2003, 2006
- Challenge Yves du Manoir
  - Champions (4): 1934, 1988, 1993, 1995
  - Runners-up (2): 1971, 1984
- French Cup
  - Champions (4): 1946, 1947, 1984, 1998
  - Runners-up (2): 1949, 1985
- Toulouse Masters
  - Champions (2): 1986, 1990

== European record ==
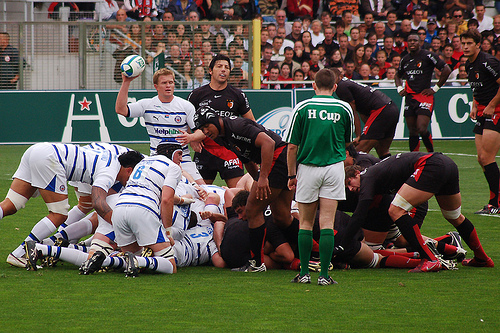
Toulouse playing Bath in the 2013 Heineken Cup.

- Toulouse qualified for the Heineken Cup in every season of that competition's existence (1995–96 to 2013–14), and played in the inaugural season of the replacement competition, the European Rugby Champions Cup.
- The club have the best competition record in the Heineken Cup/European Rugby Champions Cup, having won the competition six times and having played eight finals, and was the first team to win over 100 games in the history of the competition.
- Stade toulousain completed "the Double" (Heineken Cup/European Rugby Champions Cup-National Championship) 3 times (1995–1996, 2020-2021 and 2023–2024), a record in Europe.
- Vincent Clerc is the second all-time top try scorer in Heineken Cup/European Rugby Champions Cup history, having scored 36 units.

Season	Competition	Games				Points			Notes
Season	Competition	played	won	drawn	lost	for	against	difference	Notes
2023–24	European Rugby Champions Cup	8	8	0	0	342	150	+192	Champions (defeated Leinster)
2022–23	European Rugby Champions Cup	7	6	0	1	219	123	+96	Semi-finalists (lost to Leinster)
2021–22	European Rugby Champions Cup	4	1	1	2	61	65	-4	Semi-finalists (lost to Leinster)
2020–21	European Rugby Champions Cup	6	6	0	0	161	93	+68	Champions (defeated La Rochelle)
2019–20	European Rugby Champions Cup	8	7	0	1	216	121	+95	Semi-finalists (lost to Exeter Chiefs)
2018–19	European Rugby Champions Cup	8	6	0	2	183	187	-4	Semi-finalists (lost to Leinster)
2017–18	did not Qualify								
2016–17	European Rugby Champions Cup	7	3	1	3	180	132	+48	Quarter-finalists (lost to Munster)
2015–16	European Rugby Champions Cup	6	1	0	5	85	173	-88	Failed to exit group stages from Pool 1.
2014–15	European Rugby Champions Cup	6	4	0	2	126	124	+2	Failed to exit group stages from Pool 4.
2013–14	Heineken Cup	7	5	0	2	166	110	56	Quarter-finalists (lost to Munster)
2012–13	Heineken Cup	6	4	0	2	132	84	48	Second place in Pool 2; parachuted into European Challenge Cup
2012–13	European Challenge Cup	1	0	0	1	19	30	−11	Quarter-finalists (lost to Perpignan)
2011–12	Heineken Cup	7	4	0	3	164	124	40	Quarter-finalists (lost to Edinburgh)
2010–11	Heineken Cup	8	6	0	2	205	137	68	Semi-finalists (lost to Leinster)
2009–10	Heineken Cup	9	8	0	1	232	143	89	Champions (defeated Biarritz Olympique)
2008–09	Heineken Cup	7	4	1	2	127	97	30	Quarter-finalists (lost to Cardiff Blues)
2007–08	Heineken Cup	9	6	0	3	210	119	91	Runners-up (lost to Munster)
2006–07	Heineken Cup	6	3	0	3	147	145	2	Failed to exit group stages from Pool 5.
2005–06	Heineken Cup	7	5	1	1	223	165	58	Quarter-finalists (lost to Leinster)
2004–05	Heineken Cup	9	8	0	1	263	144	119	Champions (defeated Stade Français Paris)
2003–04	Heineken Cup	9	7	0	2	232	113	119	Runners-up (lost to Wasps)
2002–03	Heineken Cup	9	8	0	1	308	163	145	Champions (defeated Perpignan)
2001–02	Heineken Cup	6	3	0	3	151	146	5	Failed to exit group stages from Pool 6.
2000–01	Heineken Cup	6	2	1	3	171	182	−11	Failed to exit group stages from Pool 3.
1999–00	Heineken Cup	8	6	0	2	256	122	134	Semi-finalists (lost to Munster)
1998–99	Heineken Cup	7	4	0	3	247	118	129	Quarter-finalists (lost to Ulster)
1997–98	Heineken Cup	8	6	1	1	273	153	120	Semi-finalists (lost to Brive)
1996–97	Heineken Cup	6	4	0	2	194	197	−3	Semi-finalists (lost to Leicester Tigers)
1995–96	Heineken Cup	4	4	0	0	123	40	83	Champions (defeated Cardiff)

== Current standings ==
2025–26 Top 14 Table
Pos	Team	Pld	W	D	L	PF	PA	PD	TF	TA	TB	LB	Pts	Qualification
1	Toulouse	26	18	0	8	981	617	+364	134	73	13	3	86 (Note: Toulouse received a two-point deduction due to irregularities around the transfer of their former player Melvyn Jaminet)	Qualification for playoff semi-finals and European Rugby Champions Cup
2	Montpellier	26	17	1	8	824	587	+237	101	69	8	4	82	Qualification for playoff semi-finals and European Rugby Champions Cup
3	Stade Français	26	15	1	10	869	664	+205	113	83	11	6	79	Qualification for playoff semi-final qualifiers and European Rugby Champions Cup
4	Pau	26	17	0	9	817	665	+152	98	82	7	3	78	Qualification for playoff semi-final qualifiers and European Rugby Champions Cup
5	Racing 92	26	16	1	9	828	723	+105	101	91	6	2	74	Qualification for playoff semi-final qualifiers and European Rugby Champions Cup
6	La Rochelle	26	15	0	11	824	634	+190	106	73	8	4	72	Qualification for playoff semi-final qualifiers and European Rugby Champions Cup
7	Clermont	26	15	0	11	812	708	+104	103	87	8	3	71	Qualification for European Rugby Champions Cup
8	Bordeaux Bègles	26	14	0	12	822	719	+103	113	90	8	6	70	Qualification for European Rugby Champions Cup
9	Toulon	26	12	1	13	714	820	−106	96	103	8	1	59	Qualification for European Rugby Challenge Cup
10	Castres	26	11	0	15	660	751	−91	81	96	3	8	55	Qualification for European Rugby Challenge Cup
11	Lyon	26	11	1	14	734	774	−40	92	101	3	3	52	Qualification for European Rugby Challenge Cup
12	Bayonne	26	11	0	15	747	869	−122	94	113	4	3	51	Qualification for European Rugby Challenge Cup
13	Perpignan	26	6	0	20	550	797	−247	64	99	1	4	29	Qualification for relegation play-off
14	Montauban	26	1	1	24	495	1349	−854	61	197	0	1	7	Relegation to Pro D2

Updated to match(es) played on 17 May 2026. Source: Top 14

== Selected presidents ==
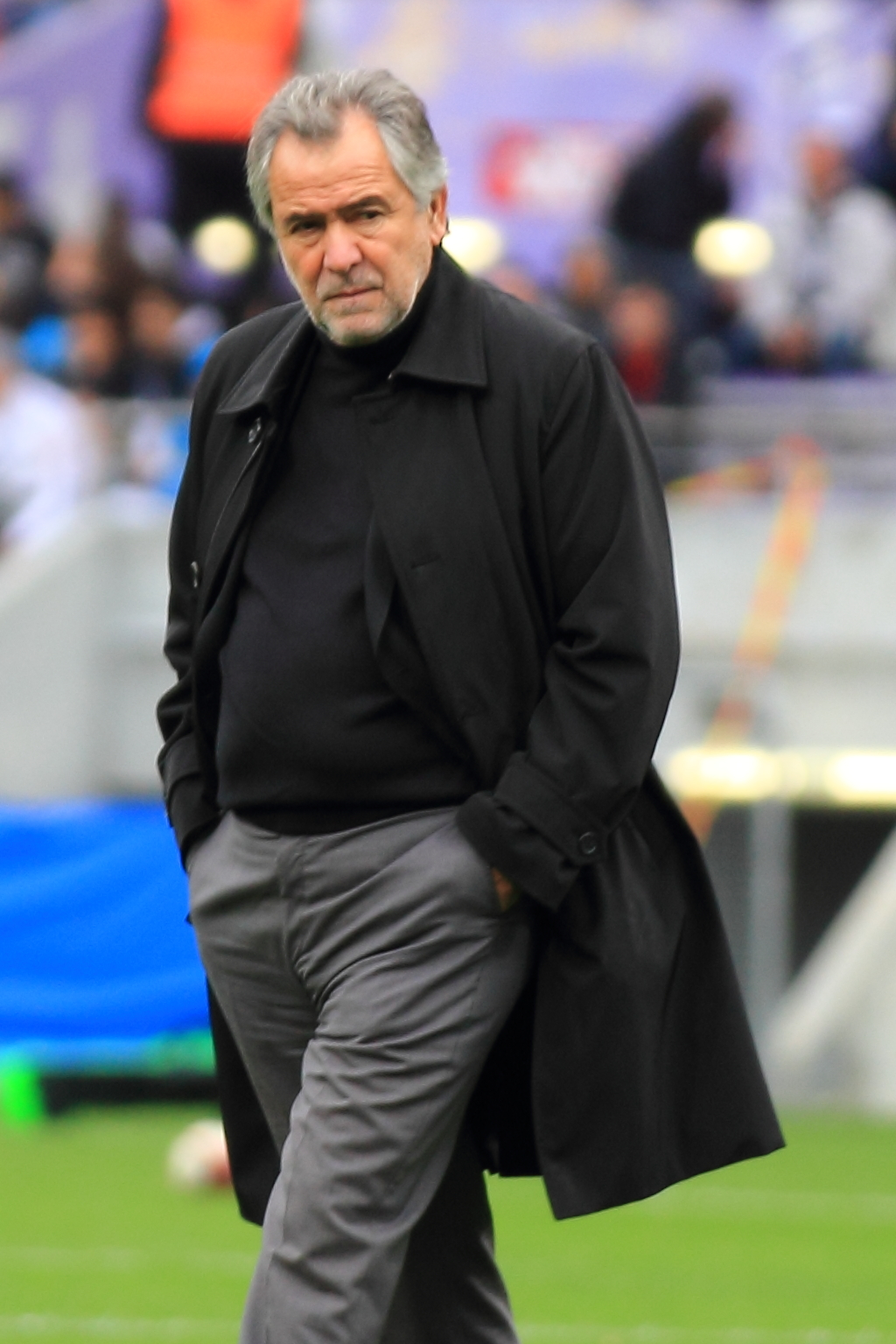
René Bouscatel.
- Ernest Wallon: 1907–12
- Charles Audry: 1912–30
- Louis Puech: 1944–51
- Jean Fabre: 1980–90
- René Bouscatel: 1992–2017
- Didier Lacroix: 2017-

Bouscatel is the most successful president in the club's history.

== Selected former coaches ==
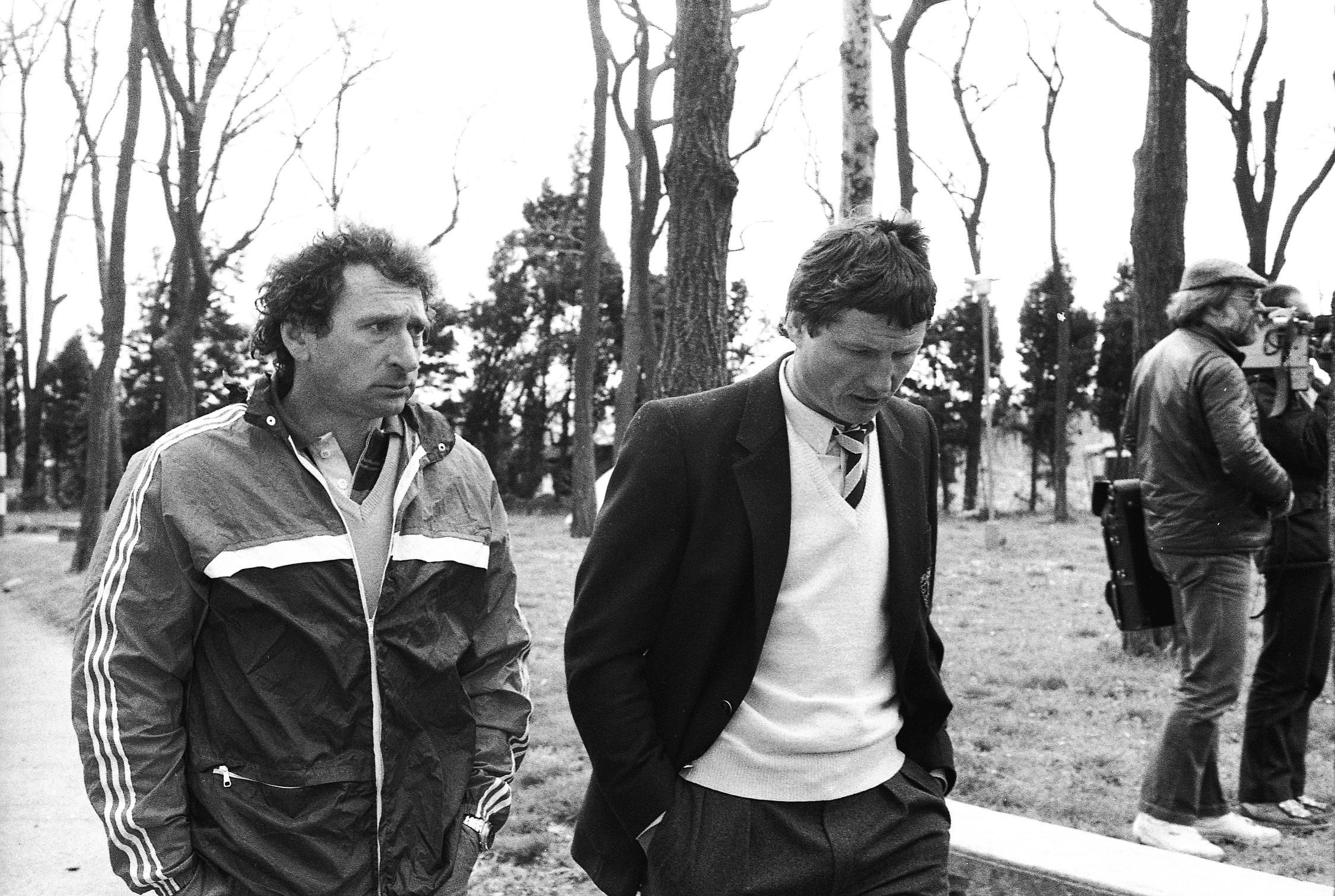
Pierre Villepreux and Jean-Claude Skrela.

- (Australia) Tom "Rusty" Richards: 1913 (as player/manager)
- (France) François Borde: 1928–30, 1934–38
- (France) Roger Piteu: 1945–49
- (France) Claude Labatut: 1971–76, 1976–80
- (France) Robert Bru: 1980–83
- (France) Pierre Villepreux: 1982-89 (coached along with Skrela between 1983 and 1989)
- (France) Jean-Claude Skrela: 1983-92 (coached along with Villepreux between 1983 and 1989)
- (France) Guy Novès: 1988-90 (as assistant coach), 1993–2015
- (France) Ugo Mola: 2015-

== Current squad ==
The Toulouse squad for the 2026–27 season is:

Stade Toulousain 2026–27 Top 14 squad
**Props**: (United States) **David Ainu'u**; (France) **Dorian Aldegheri**; (France) **Cyril Baille**; (France) Benjamin Bertrand; (France) **Georges-Henri Colombe**; (Australia) Malachi Hawkes; (France) **Paul Mallez**; (Spain) **Joel Merkler**; (France) **Rodrigue Neti**; (Argentina) **Tomas Rapetti**; **Hookers**: (France) Thomas Lacombre; (France) **Julien Marchand**; (France) **Peato Mauvaka**; **Locks**: (France) Roméo Bonnard Martin; (France) **Joshua Brennan**; (Argentina) **Efraín Elías**; (France) **Thibaud Flament**; (France) **Emmanuel Meafou**; (France) Clément Vergé	**Back row**: (France) Léo Banos; (France) Mathis Castro-Ferreira; (France) **François Cros**; (France) **Anthony Jelonch**; (France) Théo Ntamack; (France) **Alexandre Roumat**; (England) **Jack Willis**; **Scrum-halves**: (France) Simon Daroque; (France) **Antoine Dupont** **(c)**; (France) **Paul Graou**; **Fly-halves**: (Scotland) **Blair Kinghorn**; (France) **Romain Ntamack**; (Spain) **Lucien Richardis**	**Centres**: (France) **Pierre-Louis Barassi**; (Argentina) **Santiago Chocobares**; (France) **Kalvin Gourgues**; (Italy) **Tommaso Menoncello**; (France) Célian Pouzelgues; **Wings**: (Italy) **Ange Capuozzo**; (France) Nelson Épée; (France) **Matthis Lebel**; (France) **Teddy Thomas**; **Fullbacks**: (Argentina) **Juan Cruz Mallía**; (France) **Thomas Ramos**; (Belgium) **Matias Remue**
**(c)** denotes the team captain. **Bold** denotes internationally capped players. Source:

=== Espoirs squad ===
Stade Toulousain 2026–27 Espoirs squad
**Props**: (France) Rafael Gallandro; (France) Dylane Gigan; (France) Gaetan Granie; (France) Joe Lafarge; (France) Mohamed Megherbi; (France) Herman Mekenese; (France) Naime Sans-Nahort; (France) Noa Tinnirello; (Netherlands) Melvin Wevers; **Hookers**: (France) Mathis Caublot; (France) Enzo Fluxa; (France) Maxime Gardelle; (France) Guilhem Lacand; (France) Jules Luscan; (France) Sacha Segard; **Locks**: (France) Eliot Barrie; (France) Ryane Benharrou; (France) Jules Bonnard Martin; (France) Alban Portat; (France) Raphael Portat; (Spain) Aleix Ribera; (Italy) Matteo Rosi; (New Zealand) Preston Tekori; (France) Mathis Thomas; (France) Thomas Warme; (France) Tsiaro Yohan Randrianary	**Back row**: (France) Bobby Brennan; (France) Azur Hot-Simon; (France) Marc-Elie Kouassi; (France) Hugo Ibres; (France) Martin Labarthe; (France) Elias Libourel; (Australia) Heinz Lemoto; (France) Marceau Marzullo; (France) Guillaume Raynaud; (France) Bambo Sambou; (France) Hugo Soubre; (France) Baptiste Vialas; **Scrum-halves**: (France) Victor Blanc; (Italy) Lorenzo Ferrari; (France) Nathan Llaveria; (France) Zenon Rendu; **Fly-halves**: (France) Louis Companyo; (France) Binintxo Daguerre; (France) Valemntin Delpy; (England) Jack Vas	**Centres**: (France) Jeremy About; (France) Lukas Amatio; (France) Maxence Baux; (France) Mathis Gil; (Spain) Oriol Marsinyac; (France) Axel Mirandie; (Spain) Hugo Pichardie; (Argentina) Bernardo Pucciarello; **Wings**: (France) Matt Berges; (France) Theo Castet; (France) Louis Jacquet; (Spain) Pablo Montero; (France) Jeremy Nemor; (France) Martin Thibaut; **Fullbacks**: (France) Mathis Capus; (France) Romeo Mola; (France) Enzo Traille
**Bold** denotes internationally capped players. Source:

== Notable former players ==
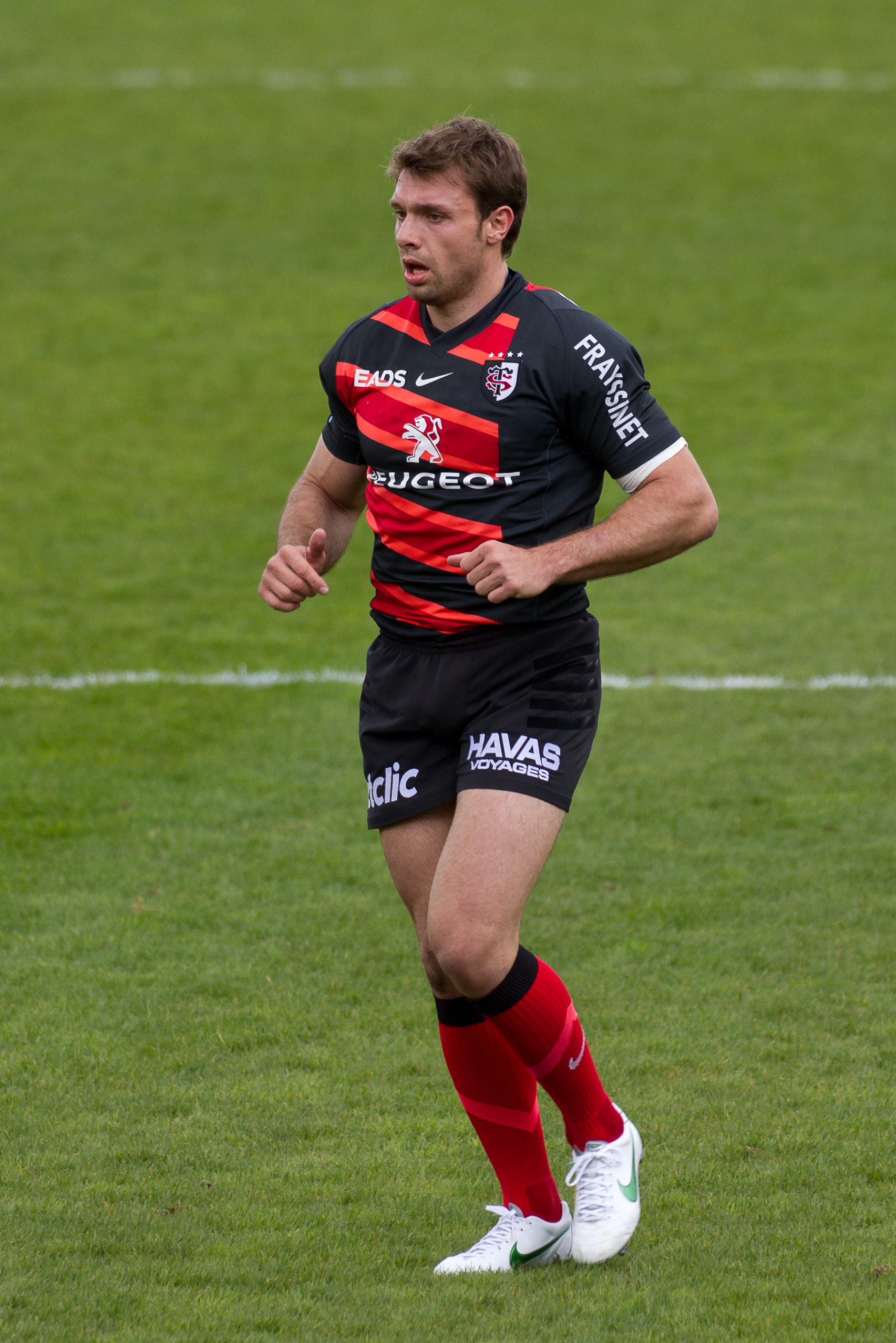
Vincent Clerc

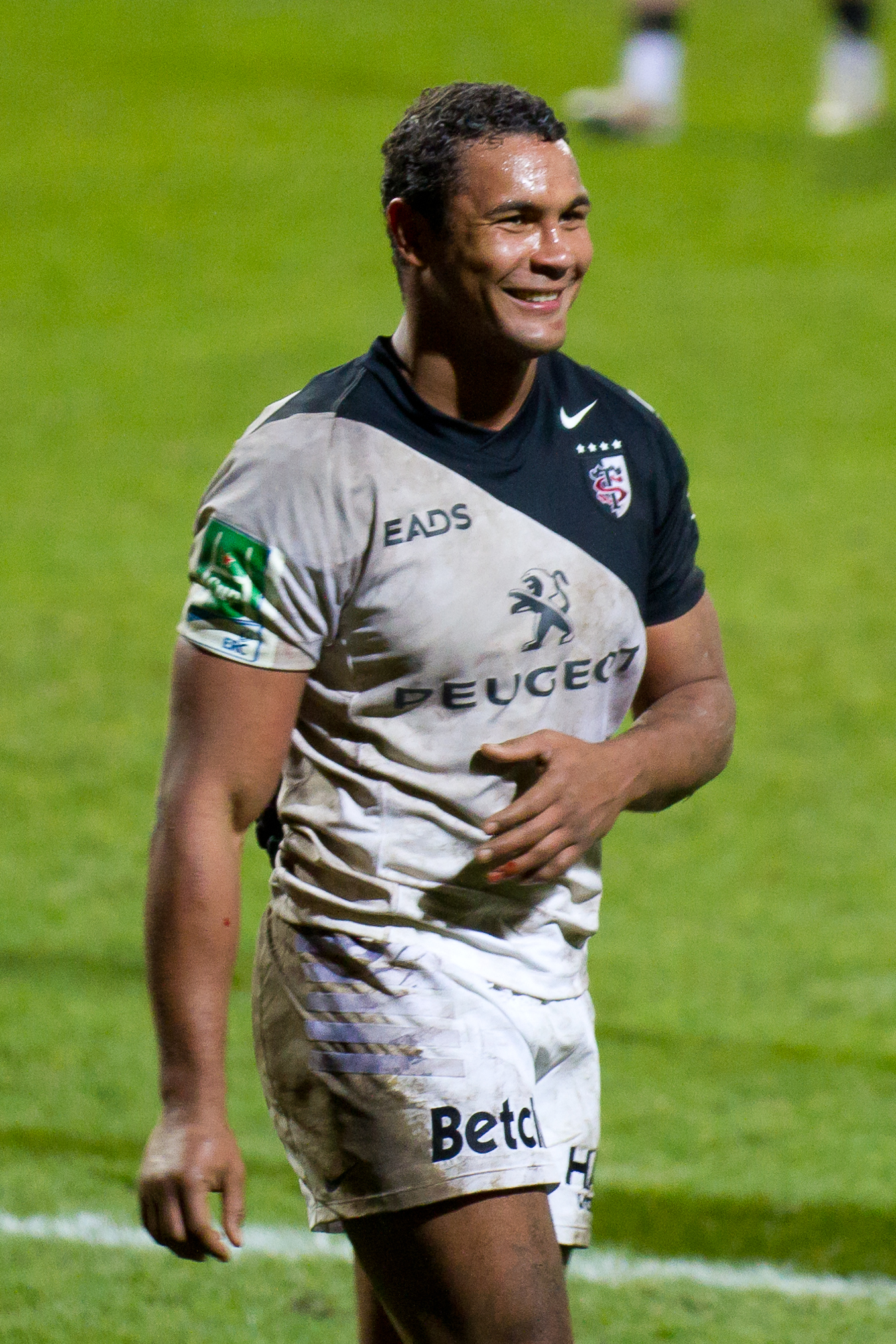
Thierry Dusautoir

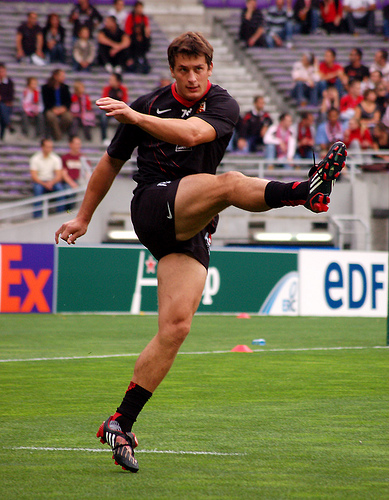
Yannick Jauzion

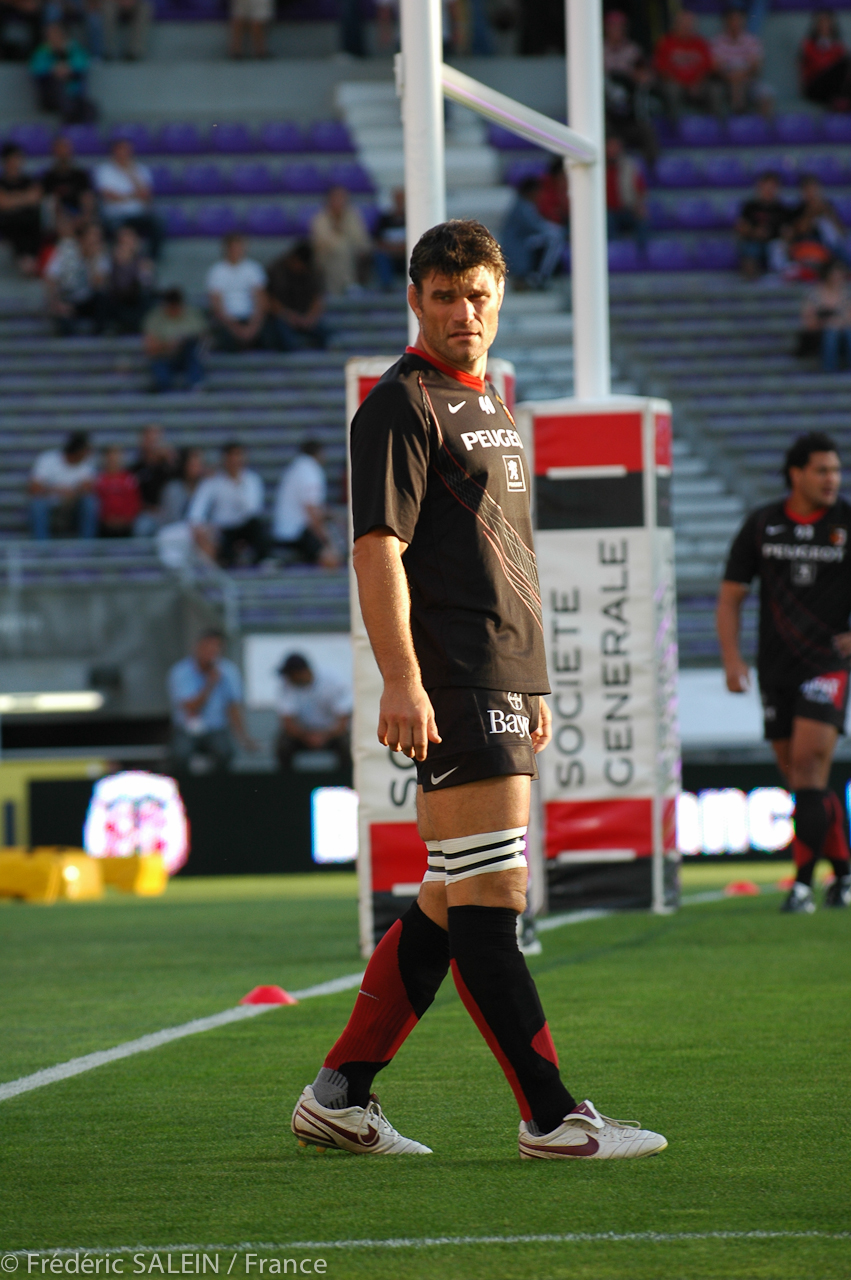
Fabien Pelous

The following are players who have represented their country, players who have won a title with the club, players who have played a sufficient number of games to go down in the club history or players who came from the academy and have made a significant career in another team:

- (Argentina) Patricio Albacete
- (Argentina) Omar Hasan
- (Argentina) Nicolás Vergallo
- (Argentina) Alberto Vernet Basualdo
- (Australia) Rory Arnold
- (Australia) Luke Burgess
- (Australia) Tala Gray
- (Australia) Tom Richards
- (England) Rob Andrew
- (England) Toby Flood
- (Fiji) Rupeni Caucaunibuca
- (Fiji) Vilimoni Delasau
- (Fiji) Semi Kunatani
- (Fiji) Maleli Kunavore
- (Fiji) Timoci Matanavou
- (Fiji) Akapusi Qera
- (France) David Aucagne
- (France) Benoît Baby
- (France) Jean Bayard
- (France) Lionel Beauxis
- (France) Franck Belot
- (France) Nicolas Bézy
- (France) Sébastien Bézy
- (France) Alexandre Bioussa
- (France) Jean-Marie Bonal
- (France) Eric Bonneval
- (France) Jean Bouilhou
- (France) François Borde
- (France) Guillaume Boussès
- (France) Yannick Bru
- (France) Jean-Marie Cadieu
- (France) Christian Califano
- (France) Yacouba Camara
- (France) Philippe Carbonneau
- (France) Thomas Castaignède
- (France) Richard Castel
- (France) Jérôme Cazalbou
- (France) Denis Charvet
- (France) André Chilo
- (France) Albert Cigagna
- (France) Vincent Clerc
- (France) Didier Codorniou
- (France) Patrice Collazo
- (France) Cédric Desbrosse
- (France) Yann Delaigue
- (France) Yann David
- (France) Christophe Deylaud
- (France) Yves Donguy
- (France) Jean-Marc Doussain
- (France) Sylvain Dupuy
- (France) Thierry Dusautoir
- (France) Jean-Baptiste Élissalde
- (France) Jean Fabre
- (France) Gaël Fickou
- (France) Jérôme Fillol
- (France) Florian Fritz
- (France) Pierre Fouyssac
- (France) Gillian Galan
- (France) Henri Galau
- (France) Xavier Garbajosa
- (France) David Gérard
- (France) Imanol Harinordoquy
- (France) Dominique Harize
- (France) Cédric Heymans
- (France) Yoann Huget
- (France) Adolphe Jauréguy
- (France) Yannick Jauzion
- (France) Nicolas Jeanjean
- (France) Christian Labit
- (France) Virgile Lacombe
- (France) Serge Lairle
- (France) Gregory Lamboley
- (France) Benoît Lecouls
- (France) Julien Le Devedec
- (France) Matthieu Lièvremont
- (France) Marcel-Frédéric Lubin-Lebrère
- (France) Yoann Maestri
- (France) Gérald Martinez
- (France) Alfred Mayssonnié
- (France) Maxime Médard
- (France) Maxime Mermoz
- (France) Frédéric Michalak
- (France) Romain Millo-Chluski
- (France) Hugues Miorin
- (France) Ugo Mola
- (France) Sylvain Nicolas
- (France) Guy Novès
- (France) Émile Ntamack
- (France) Yannick Nyanga
- (France) Alexis Palisson
- (France) Fabien Pelous
- (France) Alain Penaud
- (France) Louis Picamoles
- (France) Lucas Pointud
- (France) Clément Poitrenaud
- (France) Jean-Baptiste Poux
- (France) Jean-Pierre Rives
- (France) Philippe Rougé-Thomas
- (France) Daniel Santamans
- (France) William Servat
- (France) David Skrela
- (France) Jean-Claude Skrela
- (France) Cédric Soulette
- (France) Nicolas Spanghero
- (France) Walter Spanghero
- (France) Christopher Tolofua
- (France) Selevasio Tolofua
- (France) Franck Tournaire
- (France) Pierre Villepreux
- (Georgia (country)) Jaba Bregvadze
- (Georgia (country)) Vasil Kakovin
- (Italy) Leonardo Ghiraldini
- (Italy) Andrea Lo Cicero
- (Italy) Salvatore Perugini
- (Ireland) Trevor Brennan
- (Ireland) Aidan McCullen
- (New Zealand) Corey Flynn
- (New Zealand) Hosea Gear
- (New Zealand) Jerome Kaino
- (New Zealand) Byron Kelleher
- (New Zealand) Isitolo Maka
- (New Zealand) Luke McAlister
- (New Zealand) Lee Stensness
- (New Zealand) Neemia Tialata
- (New Zealand) (Samoa) Charlie Faumuina
- (Romania) Dragoș Dima
- (South Africa) Gaffie du Toit
- (South Africa) Gary Botha
- (South Africa) Daan Human
- (South Africa) Cheslin Kolbe
- (South Africa) Shaun Sowerby
- (South Africa) Jano Vermaak
- (South Africa) Gurthrö Steenkamp
- (Samoa) Piula Faʻasalele
- (Samoa) Census Johnston
- (Samoa) Joe Tekori
- (Scotland) Richie Gray
- (Tonga) Edwin Maka
- (Tonga) Finau Maka
- (United States) Stuart Krohn
- (Wales) Gareth Thomas

== Fans ==
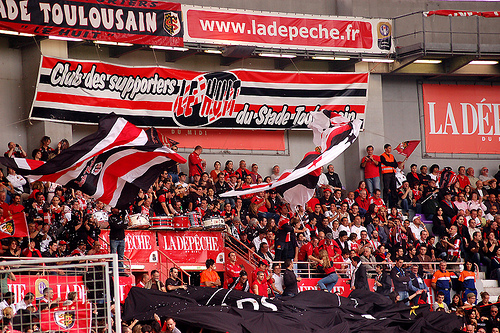
Toulouse supporters in 2008.

Being one of the most popular teams in France, Toulouse has many fan clubs all over the country:

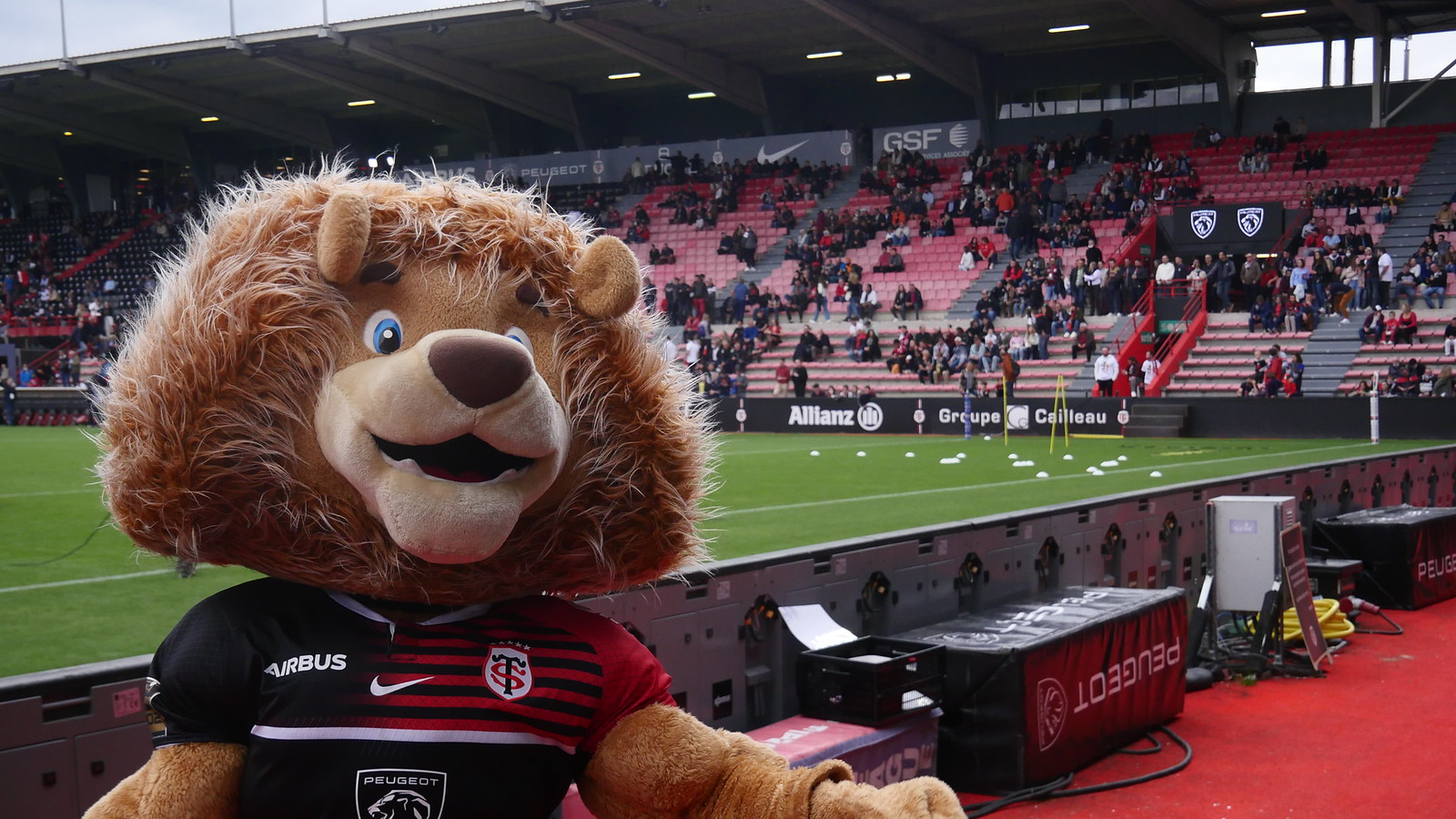
Ovalion.

- Le Huit (fan club of Stade toulousain based in Toulouse)
- Le Huit Section Aveyron (branch based in Aveyron)
- Le Rouge et le Noir (formerly Les Ultras, the oldest fan club based in Toulouse).
- Le 16e homme (fan club of Stade toulousain based in Haute-Garonne)
- Le 16e homme Toulousains 2 Paris (branch based in Paris)
- L'amicale des Supporters (fan club of Stade toulousain based in Toulouse)
- Tolosa XV (fan club of Stade toulousain based in Haute-Garonne)
- Les Salopettes Rouges (fan club based in Tarn)

Toulouse supporters are known for being very active on social media. Stade Toulousain is the most followed rugby club on social media in the world, ahead of Harlequins, Crusaders, Sharks, Toulon and Stormers.

The club's mascot, Ovalion, is a lion, the animal that is the symbol of Peugeot, the club's main sponsor.

== See also ==
- List of rugby union clubs in France
- Rugby union in France
