= Thomas Castaignède =

France international rugby union player (born 1975)

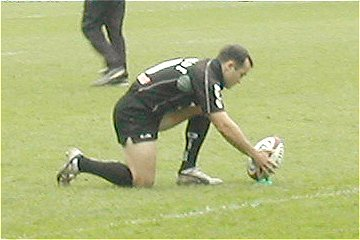
- Born: Thomas Castaignède; 21 January 1975 (age 51) Mont-de-Marsan, France
- Height: 1.75 m (5 ft 9 in)
- Weight: 84 kg (13 st 3 lb)
- Occupation: Banking

Rugby union career
- Position(s): Fly-half, Centre, Fullback
Amateur team(s)
Years	Team	Apps	(Points)
–1993	Mont-de-Marsan		
Senior career
Years	Team	Apps	(Points)
1993–1994	Mont-de-Marsan		
1994–1997	Toulouse		
1997–2000	Castres		
2000–2007	Saracens	58	(429)
International career
Years	Team	Apps	(Points)
1995–2007	France	54	(252)

Thomas Castaignède (born 21 January 1975) is a rugby union footballer from Mont-de-Marsan.

Born in Mont-de-Marsan, Aquitaine, Castaignède played as a junior and senior for Stade Montois in various positions, initially as fly-half or centre, and latterly as fullback. He joined Toulouse to help them win French titles in three successive seasons, and lifted the inaugural European Cup with the club. Castaignède then played for Castres Olympique before joining Saracens.

Developing his career in preparation for his retirement, Castaignède became a rugby union columnist for The Guardian, a television pundit for Canal+ and occasionally ITV Sport, and started an association and occasional work with French banking group Société Générale. On 10 May 2007, despite offers to return to France with various clubs, Castaignède announced his retirement from the sport after the 2007 Rugby World Cup in September, choosing to pursue a career in banking in London.
