= Franck Belot =

French rugby union player (born 1972)

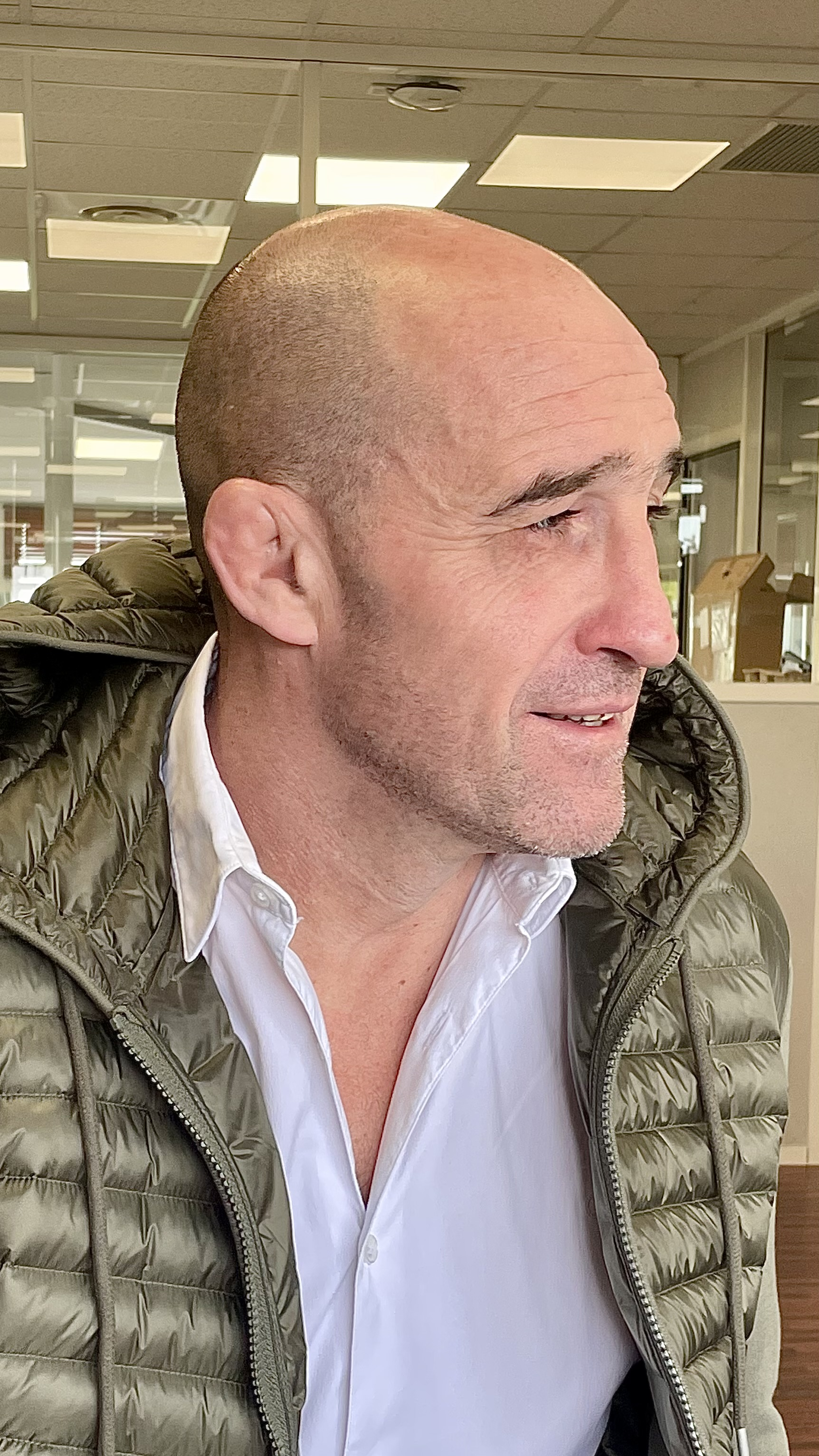
- Born: 18 March 1972 (age 54) Athis-Mons, France
- Height: 1.94 m (6 ft 4 1/2 in)
- Weight: 107 kg (16 st 12 lb)

Rugby union career
- Position: lock
Senior career
Years	Team	Apps	(Points)
1992–2002	Stade Toulousain	350	(25)
International career
Years	Team	Apps	(Points)
2000	France	1	(0)

Franck Belot (born 18 March 1972, in Athis-Mons) is a former French rugby union player. He played as a lock.

He played for Stade Toulousain. He won to win six titles of French Champion, for 1994, 1995, 1996, 1997, 1999 and 2001 and the first European Cup in 1996. He earned his only cap with the French national team on 19 March 2000 against Ireland at Stade de France.

== Honours ==
- French rugby champion, 1994, 1995, 1996, 1997, 1999 and 2001
- Challenge Yves du Manoir 1993, 1995 and 1998
- Heineken Cup 1996
