= Hugues Miorin =

French rugby union player (born 1968)

- Born: 30 October 1968 (age 58) Fumel, France
- Height: 1.92 m (6 ft 4 in)
- Weight: 114 kg (17 st 13 lb)

Rugby union career
- Position: lock
Senior career
Years	Team	Apps	(Points)
1992–2002	Toulouse		
2002-2003	US Colomiers		
International career
Years	Team	Apps	(Points)
1996-2000	France	9	(0)

Hugues Miorin (born 30 November 1968) is a French former rugby union player. He played as a lock.

He played for Stade Toulousain. He won six titles of French Champion, for 1994, 1995, 1996, 1997, 1999 and 2001 and the first European Cup in 1996. Miorin also earned six caps with the French national team from 1996 to 2000. He made his international debut on 20 April 1996 against Romania.

Miorin retired in 2003 due to thrombosis in an arm.

== Honours ==
- French rugby champion, 1994, 1995, 1996, 1997, 1999 and 2001
- Challenge Yves du Manoir 1993, 1995 and 1998
- Heineken Cup 1996
