= Christophe Deylaud =

France international rugby union player & coach

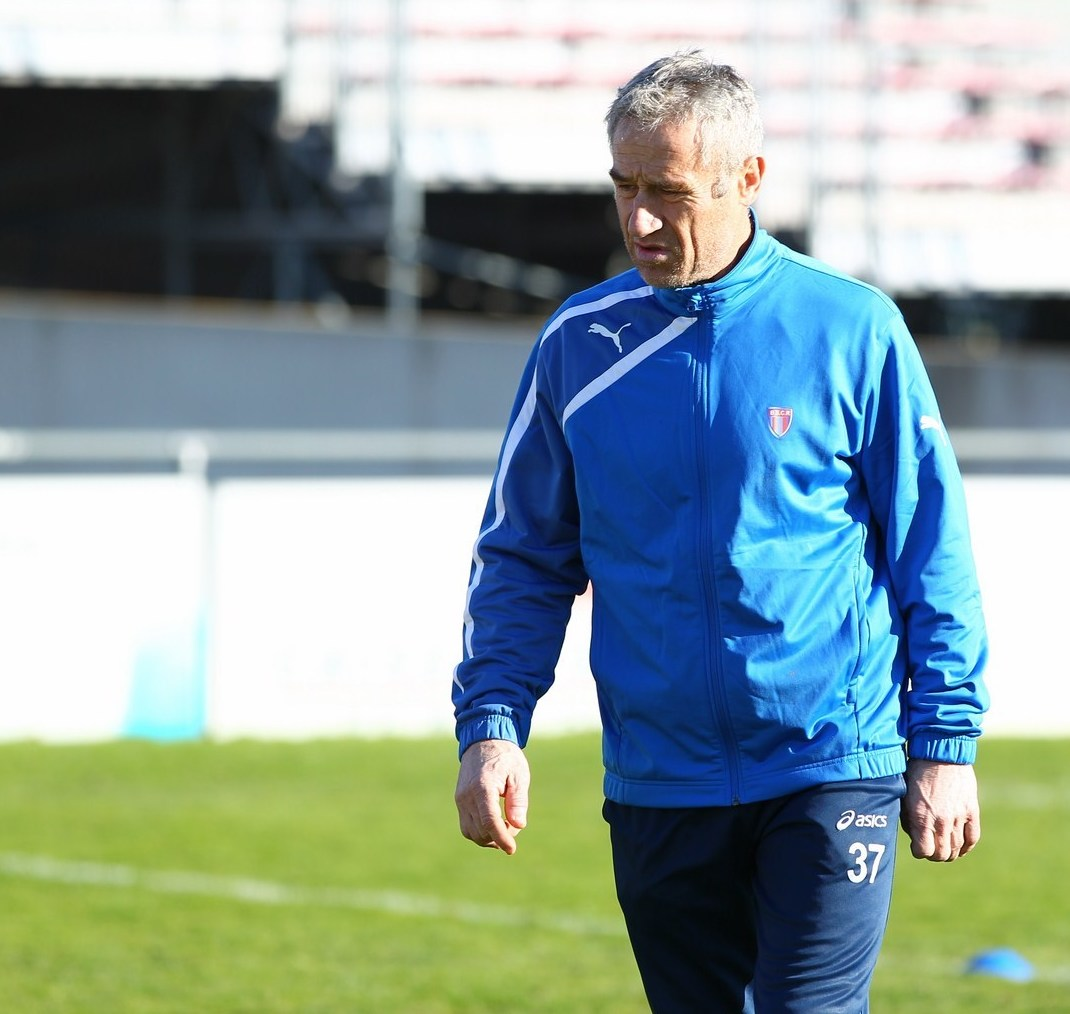
- Born: 2 October 1964 (age 62) Toulouse, Haute-Garonne, Occitania, France
- Height: 1.75 m (5 ft 9 in)
- Weight: 74 kg (11 st 9 lb)

Rugby union career
- Position(s): Fly-half; Centre
Senior career
Years	Team	Apps	(Points)
1982-1985	US Portet-sur-Garonne		
1985-1990	Blagnac SCR		
1990-1991	RC Toulon		
1991-1999	Stade Toulousain		
1999-2000	SU Agen		
International career
Years	Team	Apps	(Points)
1992-1995	France	16	(51)
Coaching career
- Years: Team
- 2000-2006: SU Agen
- 2008-2012: SU Agen
- 2012-2014: Aviron Bayonnais
- 2015-2021: Blagnac SCR
- 2022: SU Agen

Christophe Deylaud (born 2 October 1964 in Toulouse) is a French former rugby union footballer and a current coach. He played as a fly-half and as a centre.

Deylaud first played at Portet-sur-Garonne, and from there moved to Blagnac SCR, where he stayed from 1985/86 to 1989/90. He played two seasons at RC Toulon, before joining Stade Toulousain. He went on to win four French Champion titles, in 1994, 1995, 1996 and 1997, and the Heineken Cup, in 1996. He also won twice the Challenge Yves-du-Manoir, in 1993 and 1995. Deylaud finished his career at SU Agen, and after retiring from playing went on to become the assistant coach for the same club. He is currently the head coach of Blagnac SCR.

Deylaud was capped 16 times for France, from 1992 to 1995, which included a memorable series win in New Zealand against the All Blacks in 1994. He was also selected for the 1995 Rugby World Cup in South Africa. During his international career, he scored 1 try, 5 penalties, 11 conversions, and 3 drop goals, 51 points in aggregate.
