= Jérôme Cazalbou =

French rugby union player (born 1969)

- Born: 30 April 1969 (age 57) Toulouse, France
- Height: 1.75 m (5 ft 9 in)
- Weight: 78 kg (12 st 4 lb)

Rugby union career
- Position: Scrum half
Senior career
Years	Team	Apps	(Points)
1986-2001	Stade Toulousain		
International career
Years	Team	Apps	(Points)
1997	France	4	(0)

Jérôme Cazalbou (born April 30, 1969, in Toulouse) is a retired rugby union player in the Top 14.

Jérôme Cazalbou's position of choice was scrum-half. He played four caps for Stade Toulousain, of which he won seven French championship. He earned his first cap for the France national team on October 18, 1997, against Italy. He retired from playing at the end of the 2000–2001 season after a new title with season spent with Stade Toulousain.
