= List of Olympic medalists in rugby =

This is a list of Olympic medalists in rugby.

== Current Program ==
=== Men's ===
Games	Gold	Silver	Bronze
2016 Rio de Janeiro	Fiji: Masivesi Dakuwaqa; Apisai Domolailai; Osea Kolinisau; Semi Kunatani; Viliame Mata; Leone Nakarawa; Vatemo Ravouvou; Kitione Taliga; Josua Tuisova; Jerry Tuwai; Jasa Veremalua; Samisoni Viriviri; Savenaca Rawaca	Great Britain: Mark Bennett; Dan Bibby; Phil Burgess; Sam Cross; James Davies; Ollie Lindsay-Hague; Ruaridh McConnochie; Tom Mitchell; Dan Norton; Mark Robertson; James Rodwell; Marcus Watson	South Africa: Cecil Afrika; Tim Agaba; Kyle Brown; Juan de Jongh; Justin Geduld; Francois Hougaard; Werner Kok; Cheslin Kolbe; Dylan Sage; Kwagga Smith; Philip Snyman; Roscko Speckman; Seabelo Senatla
2020 Tokyo	Fiji: Napolioni Bolaca; Vilimoni Botitu; Meli Derenalagi; Sireli Maqala; Iosefo Masi; Waisea Nacuqu; Kalione Nasoko; Semi Radradra; Aminiasi Tuimaba; Asaeli Tuivuaka; Jerry Tuwai; Josua Vakurunabili; Jiuta Wainiqolo	New Zealand: Kurt Baker; Dylan Collier; Scott Curry; Sam Dickson; Andrew Knewstubb; Ngarohi McGarvey-Black; Tim Mikkelson; Sione Molia; Etene Nanai-Seturo; Tone Ng Shiu; Amanaki Nicole; William Warbrick; Regan Ware; Joe Webber	Argentina: Santiago Álvarez; Lautaro Bazán; Lucio Cinti; Felipe del Mestre; Rodrigo Etchart; Luciano González; Rodrigo Isgro; Santiago Mare; Ignacio Mendy; Marcos Moneta; Matías Osadczuk; Gastón Revol; Germán Schulz
2024 Paris	France: Jean-Pascal Barraque; Antoine Dupont; Théo Forner; Aaron Grandidier Nkanang; Jefferson Lee Joseph; Stephen Parez; Varian Pasquet; Rayan Rebbadj; Paulin Riva (c); Jordan Sepho; Andy Timo; Antoine Zeghdar	Fiji: Joseva Talacolo; Iosefo Masi; Iowane Teba; Sevuloni Mocenacagi; Josaia Raisuqe; Jeremia Matana; Terio Tamani; Ponepati Loganimasi; Selestino Ravutaumada; Jerry Tuwai; Kaminieli Rasaku; Waisea Nacuqu	South Africa: Christie Grobbelaar; Ryan Oosthuizen; Impi Visser; Zain Davids; Quewin Nortje; Tiaan Pretorius; Shaun Williams; Selvyn Davids (c); Tristan Leyds; Rosko Specman; Siviwe Soyizwapi; Shilton van Wyk
2028 Los Angeles			

=== Women's ===
Games	Gold	Silver	Bronze
2016 Rio de Janeiro	Australia: Nicole Beck; Charlotte Caslick; Emilee Cherry; Chloe Dalton; Gemma Etheridge; Ellia Green; Shannon Parry; Evania Pelite; Alicia Quirk; Emma Tonegato; Amy Turner; Sharni Williams	New Zealand: Shakira Baker; Kelly Brazier; Gayle Broughton; Theresa Fitzpatrick; Sarah Goss; Huriana Manuel; Kayla McAlister; Tyla Nathan-Wong; Terina Te Tamaki; Ruby Tui; Niall Williams; Portia Woodman	Canada: Brittany Benn; Hannah Darling; Bianca Farella; Jen Kish; Ghislaine Landry; Megan Lukan; Kayla Moleschi; Karen Paquin; Kelly Russell; Ashley Steacy; Natasha Watcham-Roy; Charity Williams
2020 Tokyo	New Zealand: Michaela Blyde; Kelly Brazier; Gayle Broughton; Theresa Fitzpatrick; Stacey Fluhler; Sarah Hirini; Shiray Kaka; Tyla Nathan-Wong; Risi Pouri-Lane; Alena Saili; Ruby Tui; Portia Woodman	France: Coralie Bertrand; Anne-Cécile Ciofani; Caroline Drouin; Camille Grassineau; Lina Guérin; Fanny Horta; Shannon Izar; Chloé Jacquet; Carla Neisen; Séraphine Okemba; Chloé Pelle; Jade Ulutule	Fiji: Lavena Cavuru; Raijieli Daveua; Sesenieli Donu; Laisana Likuceva; Rusila Nagasau; Ana Naimasi; Alowesi Nakoci; Roela Radiniyavuni; Viniana Riwai; Tokasa Seniyasi; Vasiti Solikoviti; Reapi Ulunisau
2024 Paris	New Zealand: Michaela Blyde; Jazmin Felix-Hotham; Sarah Hirini; Tyla King; Jorja Miller; Manaia Nuku; Mahina Paul; Risaleeana Pouri-Lane; Alena Saili; Theresa Setefano; Stacey Waaka; Portia Woodman-Wickliffe	Canada: Caroline Crossley; Olivia Apps; Alysha Corrigan; Asia Hogan-Rochester; Chloe Daniels; Charity Williams; Florence Symonds; Carissa Norsten; Krissy Scurfield; Fancy Bermudez; Piper Logan; Keyara Wardley; Taylor Perry; Shalaya Valenzuela	United States: Alev Kelter; Lauren Doyle; Kayla Canett; Kristi Kirshe; Ilona Maher; Ariana Ramsey; Naya Tapper; Alena Olsen; Alex Sedrick; Sammy Sullivan; Sarah Levy; Stephanie Rovetti
2028 Los Angeles			

== Discontinued event ==
This is a list of Olympic medalists in rugby union.

Games	Gold	Silver	Bronze
1900 Paris	France; Alexandre Pharamond; Frantz Reichel; Jean Collas; Constantin Henriquez (HAI); Auguste Giroux; André Rischmann; Léon Binoche; Charles Gondouin; André Roosevelt; Hubert Lefèbvre; Émile Sarrade; Wladimir Aïtoff; Joseph Olivier; Jean-Guy Gauthier; Abel Albert; Victor Larchandet; Jean Hervé	Germany; Hermann Kreuzer; Arnold Landvoigt; Heinrich Reitz; Jacob Herrmann; Erich Ludwig; Hugo Betting; August Schmierer; Fritz Muller; Adolf Stockhausen; Hans Latscha; Willy Hofmeister; Georg Wenderoth; Eduard Poppe; Richard Ludwig; Albert Amrhein	none awarded
1900 Paris	France; Alexandre Pharamond; Frantz Reichel; Jean Collas; Constantin Henriquez (HAI); Auguste Giroux; André Rischmann; Léon Binoche; Charles Gondouin; André Roosevelt; Hubert Lefèbvre; Émile Sarrade; Wladimir Aïtoff; Joseph Olivier; Jean-Guy Gauthier; Abel Albert; Victor Larchandet; Jean Hervé	Great Britain F. C. Bayliss; J. Henry Birtles; James Cantion; Arthur Darby; Clement Deykin; Leslie Hood; M. L. Logan; Herbert Loveitt; Herbert Nicol; V. Smith; M. W. Talbot; Joseph Wallis; Claude Whittindale; Raymond Whittindale; Francis Wilson	none awarded
1904 St. Louis	not included in the Olympic program		
1908 London	Australasia; Phil Carmichael; Charles Russell; Daniel Carroll; Jack Hickey; Frank Smith; Chris McKivat; Arthur McCabe; Thomas Griffen; John Barnett; Patrick McCue; Sydney Middleton; Tom Richards; Malcolm McArthur; Charles McMurtrie; Robert Craig	Great Britain; John Jackett; Barney Solomon; Bert Solomon; Frederick Dean; J. T. Jose; Thomas Wedge; James Davey; Richard Jackett; E. J. Jones; Arthur Wilson; Nicholas Tregurtha; A. Lawrey; C. R. Marshall; A. Wilcocks; John Trevaskis	none awarded
1912 Stockholm	not included in the Olympic program		
1920 Antwerp	United States; Daniel Carroll; Charles Doe; George Fish; James Fitzpatrick; Joseph Hunter; Morris Kirksey; Charles Mehan; John Muldoon; John O'Neil; John Patrick; Cornelius Righter; Colby Slater; Rudolph Scholz; Dink Templeton; Charles Lee Tilden, Jr. James Winston; Heaton Wrenn	France; Alfred Eluère; Jean Bruneval; André Chilo; Armand Grenet; François Borde; René Crabos; Edouard Bader; Raoul Thiercelin; Adolphe Bousquet; Sélim Curtet; Jacques Forestier; Raymond Berrurier; Eugène Soulié; Maurice Labeyrie; Robert Levasseur; Constant Lamaigniere; Pierre Petiteau; Robert Thierry	none awarded
1924 Paris	United States; Philip Clark; Norman Cleaveland; Hugh Cunningham; Dudley DeGroot; Robert Devereux; George Dixon; Charles Doe; Linn Farrish; Edward Graff; Joseph Hunter; Richard Hyland; Caesar Mannelli; Charles Mehan; John Muldoon; John O'Neil; John Patrick; William Rogers; Rudolph Scholz; Colby Slater; Norman Slater; Charles Lee Tilden, Jr. Edward Turkington; Alan Valentine; Alan Williams	France; René Araou; Jean Bayard; Louis Béguet; André Béhotéguy; Alexandre Bioussa; Étienne Bonnes; François Borde; Adolphe Bousquet; Aimé Cassayet-Armagnac; Clément Dupont; Albert Dupouy; Jean Etcheberry; Henri Galau; Gilbert Gérintès; Raoul Got; Adolphe Jauréguy; René Lasserre; Marcel-Frédéric Lubin-Lebrère; Étienne Piquiral; Jean Vaysse	Romania; Dumitru Armășel; Gheorghe Benția; Teodor Florian; Ion Gîrleșteanu; Nicolae Mărăscu; Teodor Marian; Sorin Mihăilescu; Paul Nedelcovici; Iosif Nemes; Eugen Sfetescu; Mircea Sfetescu; Soare Sterian; Anastasie Tănăsescu; Mihai Vardală; Paul Vidrașcu; Dumitru Volvoreanu

== Medal table ==
Includes medals from rugby union (1900–1924) and rugby sevens (2016–2024).

Rank	Nation	Gold	Silver	Bronze	Total
1	France	2	3	0	5
2	New Zealand	2	2	0	4
3	Fiji	2	1	1	4
4	United States	2	0	1	3
5	Australasia	1	0	0	1
5	Australia	1	0	0	1
7	Great Britain	0	3	0	3
8	Canada	0	1	1	2
9	Germany	0	1	0	1
10	South Africa	0	0	2	2
11	Argentina	0	0	1	1
11	Romania	0	0	1	1
Totals (12 entries)		10	11	7	28
