= 1924 United States rugby union tour of England and France =

Summary
| P | W | D | L |
Total
| 5 | 3 | 0 | 2 |
Test match
| 2 | 2 | 0 | 0 |

Tour chronology
- England 1977 →

The 1924 United States rugby union tour of England and France was a series of five matches played by the United States in England and France during April and May 1924. The matches in England were warm-up matches for the 1924 Olympic Games. The United States was the defending Olympic champions and successfully defended their title despite fielding a team made up mainly of sportsmen from other sports. In the intervening years, between the 1920 and 1924 Olympic Games, France had played twenty-one internationals and the United States none.

== Touring party ==
=== Full backs ===
- Charles Doe (Stanford University)

=== Three-quarters ===
- Norman Cleaveland (Stanford University)
- George Dixon (University of California)
- Richard Hyland (Stanford University)
- William Rogers (Stanford University)
- Edward Turkington (Lowell High School) (Olympic Club)

=== Half-backs ===
- Robert Devereux (Stanford University)
- Rudy Scholz (Santa Clara University)

=== Forwards ===
- Philip Clark (Stanford University)
- Linn Farrish (Stanford University)
- Dudley DeGroot (Stanford University)
- Edward Graff (University of California)
- Caesar Mannelli (Santa Clara University)
- John O'Neill (Santa Clara University)
- John Patick (Stanford University)
- Colby Slater (University of California), (Davis Farm), (Olympic Club)
- Norman Slater (Berkeley High School)
- Alan Valentine (Swarthmore College), (Oxford University)

=== Undisclosed position ===
- John Cashel (Palo Alto)
- Hugh Cunningham (Santa Clara University)
- Joseph Hunter (San Mateo High), (Beliston)
- William Muldoon (Santa Clara University)
- Alan Williams (Cornell University), (Olympic Club)

== Fixtures ==
=== Tour of England ===
| Date | Venue | Home | Score | Away |
|---|---|---|---|---|
| 21 April 1924 | The Rectory, Devonport | Devonport Services RFC | 3–25 | United States |
| April 1924 | Rectory Field, Blackheath, London | Blackheath | 13–9 | United States |
| April 1924 | Twickenham Stadium, London | Harlequins | 21–11 | United States |

=== 1924 Olympic Tournament ===
| Date | Venue | Team | Score | Team |
|---|---|---|---|---|
| 11 May 1924 | Colombes Stadium, Paris | Romania | 0–37 | United States |
| 18 May 1924 | Colombes Stadium, Paris | France | 3–17 | United States |
