= 1922–23 French Rugby Union Championship =

- Countries: France
- Champions: Toulouse
- Runners-up: Bayonne

The 1922–23 French Rugby Union Championship was won by Toulouse, beating Bayonne in the final.

== Context ==
The 1923 Five Nations Championship was won by Ireland, France came 3rd with one victory against Ireland

== First round ==
Thirty teams participated in the championship. Twenty four of them were winners of regional championships and six from inter-regional barrages.

- Pool A
  - Toulouse 11 pts,
  - Grenoble 10 pts,
  - Bègles 8 pts
  - Boucau 7 pts,
  - Agen 4 pts

- Pool B
  - Bayonne 10 pts
  - US Perpignan 10 pts
  - Lourdes 10 pts,
  - Cognac 6 pts
  - Olympique Périgueux 4 pts

Tie Break:

  - Bayonne - US Perpignan 6–3

- Pool C
  - Biarritz 12 pts
  - Béziers 9 pts
  - Albi 9 pts
  - SA Bordeaux]6 pts
  - FC Moulins 4 pts

- Pool D
  - Racing 12 pts
  - Dax 10 pts
  - Toulon8 pts
  - Lézignan 6 pts
  - Chalon 4 pts

- Pool E
  - Carcassonne 10 pts
  - Périgueux 9 pts
  - Pau 9 pts
  - Toulouse OEC 8 pts,
  - Stade Français 4 pts

- Pool F
  - Stadoceste 12 pts
  - Narbonne 10 pts
  - SBUC 7 pts
  - Olympique Paris 6 pts
  - Nantes 5 pts

== Second round ==
The pool winners of the first round were divided in two pools of three.

- Pool A
  - Toulouse 6 pts,
  - Carcassonne 3 pts,
  - Biarritz olympique 3 pts
- Pool B
  - Bayonne 6 pts,
  - Racing 4 pts,
  - Stadoceste2 pts

== Final ==
Teams	Toulouse - Bayonne
Score	3-0 (0-0)
Date	13 May 1923
Venue	Stade olympique Yves-du-Manoir - Colombes
Referee	Gilbert Brutus
Line-up
Toulouse	André Maury, Jean Bayard, Gabriel Serres, André Pépion, Marcel-Frédéric Lubin-Lebrère, Jean Larrieu, Alfred Prévost, Alex Bioussa, Bernard Bergès, Henri Galau, Joseph Dournac, Léon Nougal, François Borde, Adolphe Jauréguy, Yvan Saverne
Bayonne	Edouard Lahirigoyen, Pierre Magens, Marcel Forgues, Silvano Andia, Henri Suhubiette, Eugène Landrieu, Jean-Baptiste Sales, Jean Etcheparre, Angel Sarratte, Eugène Billac, Laurent Pardo, Jean Bentaberry, André Béhotéguy, Jean Arnaudin, Henry Edward Roe
Scorers
Toulouse	1 try A.Jauréguy
Bayonne

Comme en 1922, le Stade Toulousain beat l'Aviron bayonnais in the final.

== Sources ==
- Le Figaro, 1922–1923
- Le Matin 1922
