= List of Basque rugby union players =

List of Basque rugby union players features rugby union players from the Basque Country autonomous community, Navarre and the French Basque Country

== Men's internationals ==
=== Armenia ===
- Yoan Anthian

=== France ===
- Guy Accoceberry
- Roger Aguerre
- Édouard Ainciart
- Pierre Albaladejo
- André Alvarez
- Jean-Baptiste Amestoy
- Joe Anduran
- Julien Arrieta
- René Arotça
- Pierre Arthapignet
- Jean-Louis Azarete
- Robert Basauri
- Paulin Bascou
- Robert Baulon
- André Béhotéguy
- Henri Béhotéguy
- Christian Bélascain
- Félix Bergèse
- Serge Betsen
- Jean Bichindaritz
- Philippe Bidabé
- Laurent Bidart
- Louis Bilbao
- Eugène Billac
- Serge Blanco
- Jean Boubée
- Adolphe Bringeon
- Esteban Capilla
- Didier Camberabero
- Jean-Michel Capendeguy
- Jean Castets
- Georges Caussarieu
- Michel Celaya
- Maurice Celhay
- Albert Chatau
- Jacques Chiberry
- Jean Condom
- André Cussac
- Francis Daguerre
- Jean Daguerre
- André Darrieussecq
- Georges Daudignon
- Jean Dauger
- Pierre Dospital
- Julien Dufau
- Bernard Duprat
- Julien Dupuy
- Louis Echave
- Pépito Elhorga
- Edmond Élissalde
- Jean-Baptiste Élissalde
- Jean-Pierre Élissalde
- Baptiste Erdocio
- Jean-Michel Esponda
- Jean Etcheberry
- Jean-Martin Etchenique
- Albert Etchepare
- Anthony Étrillard
- Fernand Forgues
- François Gelez
- Jean-Michel Gonzalez
- René Graciet
- André Haget
- Henri Haget
- Imanol Harinordoquy
- Antoine Hastoy
- Maurice Hedembaigt
- Arnaud Héguy
- Pierre Hontas
- Raphaël Ibañez
- Emmanuel Iguinitz
- Daniel Ilhingoue
- Vincent Inigo
- Jean Iraçabal
- Arthur Iturria
- Adolphe Jauréguy
- Pierre Jauréguy
- Marcel Jol
- Albert Kaemph
- Paul Labadie
- Rémi Laffitte
- André Lafond
- Patrice Lagisquet
- Christophe Lamaison
- Jean-Claude Langlade
- Gilbert Larréguy
- Léon Jean Larribau
- Grégoire Lascubé
- Félix Lasserre
- René Lasserre
- Auguste Laurent
- Joseph Laurent
- Pierre Lavergne
- Camille Lopez
- Aymeric Luc
- Maxime Lucu
- Thomas Mantérola
- Arnaud Marquesuzaa
- Christophe Milhères
- Gérard Murillo
- Charles Ollivon
- Pascal Ondarts
- Laurent Pardo
- Laurent Pardo
- Jean-Henri Pargade
- Lucien Pariès
- Patrick Perrier
- Julien Peyrelongue
- Jean Pilon
- François Poeydebasque
- Marius Rodrigo
- Jacques Rollet
- Alexandre Roumat
- Jean Sébédio
- Jean Semmartin
- Henri Sorondo
- Michel Sorondo
- Max Spring
- Tevita Tatafu
- Teddy Thomas
- Cheikh Tiberghien
- Pablo Uberti
- Jean-Louis Ugartemendia
- Armand Vigneau
- Christian Vignes

=== Portugal ===
- David Penalva

=== Spain ===
- Bosco Abascal
- José Antonio Abecia
- Ignacio Aceña
- Manuel Adarraga
- Francisco Xavier Alducin
- Asier Altuna
- Juan Rafael Álvarez
- Javier Amunarriz
- Sébastien Ascarat
- Oscar Astarloa
- Kerman Aurrekoetxea
- Unai Aurrekoetxea
- Beñat Auzqui
- Mattin Auzqui
- Adrien Ayestaran
- Jon Azkargorta
- Raphaël Bastide
- Aitor Beloki
- Pierre Belzunce
- J. Ignacio Bengoechea
- José Luis Benito
- Francisco Bueno
- Gorka Bueno
- José Antonio Bueno
- Miguel Burgaleta
- Amets Castrejana
- Javier Chocarro
- Javier Díaz Paternain
- Itziar Diez Murga
- Jonadab Diez Urkidi
- Damien Elgoyhen
- Mikel Elizalde
- Alberto Errandonea
- Victoriano Esnaola
- Aitor Etxebarria
- Jon Etxebarria
- Aitor Etxeberría
- Alfonso Feijoo
- Pablo Feijoo
- José Miguel Galdós
- Aratz Gallastegui
- Egoitz García
- Igor Genua
- Julen Goia
- Oier Goia
- David Hernández
- Ekain Imaz
- Gorka Imaz
- Francisco J. Iraregui
- Luis Ángel Iraregui
- Juan González Goicoechea
- José Manuel González Lozano
- Ion Insausti
- José Isasa
- Igor Isasi
- Etxaide Iturralt
- Pablo Larrauri
- Nerea Lasa
- Unai Lasa
- Iñaki Laskurain
- Kawa Leauma
- Roberto Lizarda
- Iker Lopategi
- Mickael López
- Jon Magunzelaya
- Ignacio Martín
- Augusto Martínez
- Igor Mirones
- Luis Ramón Moneo
- Alfonso Mujica
- José F. Munguia
- Juan Carlos Muñoz Clement
- Manuel Ordas
- Luis M. Petricorena
- Francisco Puertas Soto
- Máximo Romero
- Guillaume Rouet
- José Salazar
- Julio Segurola
- Ignacio Sese
- Estibaliz Uriarte
- Imanol Urraza
- Asier Usarraga
- Enrique Uzquiano
- José Antonio del Valle
- Iñaki Zabala
- Jon Zabala
- Hipólito Zabaleta
- Ander Zulet

== Women's internationals ==
=== Spain internationals ===
- Nerea Aguirre
- Karitte Alegria
- Arantxa Arana
- Beatriz Baraia-Etxaburu
- Eider Barrena
- Ioana Barrena
- Uribarri Barrutieta
- Maika Brust
- Enara Cacho
- Amets Castrejana
- Itziar Diez Murga
- Amaia Erbina
- Lide Erbina
- Rosanna Estanyol
- Victoriano Esnaola
- Inés Etxegibel
- Amaya Fernández
- Anne Fernández
- Olatz Fernández de Arroyabe
- Eider García
- Irene Heras
- Saioa Jaurena
- Nerea Lasa
- Iraide Manzano
- Nerea Martínez
- Angelina Masdeu
- Idoia Olaberria
- Agurtzane Orbegozo
- Nerea Otxoa de Aspuru
- Anna Isabel de la Parte
- Aitziber Porras
- Isabel Rodríguez
- Idoia Salazar
- Itsaso Salazar
- Maitane Salinas
- Estibaliz Uriarte

=== France internationals ===
- Carla Arbez
- Lise Arricastre
- Ana Ayerra
- Patricia Carricaburu
- Céline Ferer
- Amaya Gonzalez
- Céline Héguy
- Danièle Irazu
- Sandrine Jauregiberri
- Julie Pujol

=== Denmark internationals ===
- Patricia Imaz

== Basque heritage ==
List of Basque rugby union players features rugby union players with Basque heritage from the Basque diaspora.

World Cup players

=== United States ===
- Inaki Basauri
- Richard Tardits

=== Argentina ===
- Manuel Aguirre
- Guillermo Angaut
- Federico Martín Aramburú
- Lisandro Arbizu
- Marcos Ayerza
- Fernando Díaz Alberdi
- Felipe Ezcurra
- Mariano Galarza
- Sebastián Irazoqui
- Francisco Irarrázaval
- Mario Ledesma Arocena
- Juan Manuel Leguizamón
- Federico Méndez Azpillaga
- Guido Petti
- Martín Sugasti
- Benjamín Urdapilleta

=== Uruguay ===
- Diego Aguirre
- Santiago Arata
- Carlos Arboleya
- Juan Echeverría
- Felipe Etcheverry
- Jerónimo Etcheverry
- Juan Manuel Gaminara
- Tomás Inciarte
- Juan Menchaca
- Agustín Ormaechea
- Diego Ormaechea
- Juan Diego Ormaechea

== See also ==
- Basque Country national rugby union team
- Basque Country women's national rugby union team
- List of France national rugby union players
