= 1921–22 French Rugby Union Championship =

- Countries: France
- Champions: Toulouse
- Runners-up: Bayonne

The 1921–22 French Rugby Union Championship of first division was won by Toulouse beating Bayonne in the final.

The qualification round was completed by two pools of five teams. Stade Toulousain and Bayonne were the teams who qualified to the final.

== Context ==
The 1922 Five Nations Championship was won by Wales, while France came last.

== First round ==
Thirty clubs participated, divided into 10 pools of 3 (with home and away matches). 3 points were awarded for a win, 2 for a draw, 1 for a loss.

The winner of each pool qualified four the semifinal pool.

- Pool A
  - US Perpignan 6 pts,
  - Toulouse OEC 4 pts,
  - Nantes2 pts
- Pool B
  - Toulouse 6 pts,
  - Boucau 4 pts,
  - Chalon 2 pts
- Pool C
  - Racing Paris 6 pts,
  - SA Bordeaux 4 pts,
  - Agen 2 pts
- Pool D
  - Biarritz 6 pts,
  - Stade Saint-Gaudens 3 pts,
  - Lézignan 3 pts
- Pool E
  - Dax 6 pts,
  - Saint-Girons 4 pts,
  - Bergerac 2 pts
- Pool F
  - Grenoble 6 pts,
  - Stade Français 4 pts,
  - Narbonne 2 pts
- Pool G
  - Carcassonne 6 pts,
  - Stade bordelais 4 pts,
  - AS Bayonne 2 pts
- Pool H
  - Bayonne 6 pts,
  - Toulon4 pts,
  - Casteljaloux 2 pts
- Pool I
  - Lourdes 6 pts,
  - Périgueux4 pts,
  - CASG 2 pts
- Pool J
  - Béziers 5 pts,
  - Stadoceste tarbais 5 pts,
  - Pau 2 pts

== Second round ==
Two groups of five played, with the winners qualifying onto the final.

Pool A

  - Bayonne 11 pts,
  - US Perpignan 10 pts,
  - Lourdes 8 pts
  - Dax 6 pts
  - Grenoble 4 pts

Pool B

  - Toulouse 12 pts,
  - Biarritz 9 pts,
  - Racing Paris 9 pts,
  - Béziers 6 pts,
  - Carcassonne4 pts

== Final ==
Teams	Toulouse - Bayonne
Score	6-0 (0-0)
Date	23 April 1922
Venue	Stade du Bouscat - Bordeaux
Referee	Gilbert Brutus
Line-up
Toulouse	André Maury, Pierre Pons, Gabriel Serres, Louis Puesch, Marcel-Frédéric Lubin-Lebrère, Jean Larrieu, Alfred Prévost, Henri Vignolles, Philippe Struxiano, Henri Galau, Joseph Dournac, Léon Nougal, François Borde, Adolphe Jauréguy, André Chilo
Bayonne	Edouard Lahirigoyen, Pierre Magens, Jean-Marie Vigneau, Silvano Andia, Henri Suhubiette, Eugène Landrieu, Joseph Laurent, Jean Etcheparre, Angel Sarratte, Eugène Billac, André Lafond, Henri Béhotéguy, André Béhotéguy, Jean Arnaudin, Dominique Etchegaray
Scorers
Toulouse	1 try Galau; 1 penalty de Struxiano
Bayonne
