= 1923–24 French Rugby Union Championship =

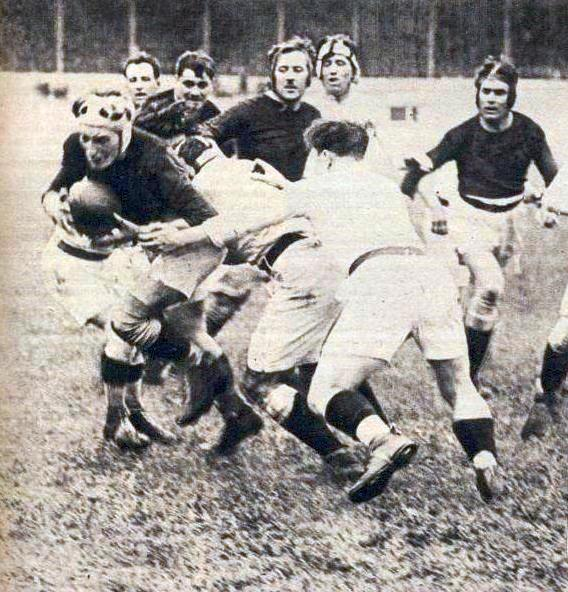
- Countries: France
- Champions: Toulouse
- Runners-up: US Perpignan

The 1923–24 French Rugby Union Championship was won for the second consecutive year by Toulouse that defeated the US Perpignan in the final.

The Championship was contested by thirty teams divided in the first round in 6 pool of 5.

== First round ==
(in bold the qualified for second round)

- **Pool A**
  - SO Avignon
  - **Béziers**
  - US Cognac
  - Hendaye
  - **Toulouse**
- **Pool B**
  - **Bayonne**
  - Chalon,
  - Grenoble
  - **Narbonne**
  - Périgueux
- **Pool C**
  - **Albi**
  - Lézignan
  - Pau
  - Poitiers
  - **Racing**
- **Pool D**
  - **AS Bayonne**
  - SBUC
  - Carcassonne
  - **Lourdes**
  - Olympique Paris
- **Pool E**
  - **Begles**
  - **US Perpignan**
  - Soustons
  - Touloun,
  - Toulouse OEC
- **Pool F**
  - Agen
  - **Biarritz**
  - SA Bordeaux
  - Stade Français
  - **Stadoceste**

== Quarter of finals ==
(in bold the qualified for semifinals round)

- **Second Round**
  - Lourdes
  - Narbonne
  - **Toulouse**
- **Pool B**
  - Albi
  - Bayonne
  - **US Perpignan**
- **Pool C**
  - Bègles
  - **Béziers**
  - Biarritz
- **Pool D**
  - Carcassonne
  - Racing
  - **Stadoceste**

== Semifinals ==
6 apr. 1924	**Toulouse**	-	Béziers	3 - 0	Carcassonne
6 apr. 1924	**Perpignan**	-	Stadoceste	10 - 0	Toulouse

== Final ==
Teams	**Toulouse** - Perpignan
Score	**3-0** (3-0)
Date	27 April 1924
Venue	Parc Lescure - Bordeaux
Referee	Henri Lahitte
Line-up
Toulouse	Yvan Saverne, Léon Nougal, Jean Borde, François Borde, Georges Allène, Henri Galau, Bernard Bergès, Jean Larrieu, Marcel Camel, Alex Bioussa, André Pepion, Marcel-Frédéric Lubin-Lebrère, Gabriel Serres, Jean Bayard, André Maury
US Perpignan	Étienne Cayrol, Raoul Got, Marcel Baillette, Roger Ramis, Marcel Darné, René Tabès, Jean Carbonne, Noël Sicart, Ernest Camo, Eugène Ribère, Gaudérique Momtassié, Camille Montadé, Joseph Sayrou, Fernand Duron, Charles Vergès
Scorers
Toulouse	1 try Serres
US Perpignan

== Other competitions ==
- In the final of Second Division, the SC Mazamétain beat SC Graulhet 3 - 0.
- In the final of third Division, the NAC Champ-sur-Drac beat FCCarmaux 8 - 3.
- In the final of Fourth Division, SC Negrepelisse beat Stade Minervois 8 - 3.
- In the final of 2nd XV championship, Bayonne beat Toulouse 14-5

== Sources ==
- L'Humanité, 1924
- Compte rendu de la finale de 1924, sur lnr.fr
- finalesrugby.com
