= List of Santa Clara University Olympians =

Many Santa Clara University alumni have competed in the Olympic Games. All SCU rugby players who competed at the 1920 and 1924 Games were on the gold medal-winning United States rugby teams.

== Antwerp 1920 ==
- Rudolph Scholz, Rugby
- James Fitzpatrick, Rugby
- John Muldoon, Rugby
- William Muldoon, Rugby
- John O'Neil, Rugby

== Paris 1924 ==
- Rudolph Scholz, Rugby
- H. Cunningham, Rugby
- John Muldoon, Rugby
- William Muldoon, Rugby
- John O'Neil, Rugby
- Caesar Mannelli, Rugby

== Mexico City 1968 ==
- Cathy Jamison, Women's Swimming

== Los Angeles 1984 ==
- Kelly Mitchell, Women's Rowing
- Rick Davis, Men's Soccer

== Seoul 1988 ==
- Rick Davis, Men's Soccer

== Barcelona 1992 ==
- Cameron Rast, Men's Soccer

== Atlanta 1996 ==
- Brandi Chastain, Women's Soccer

== Sydney 2000 ==
- Brandi Chastain, Women's Soccer
- Nikki Serlenga, Women's Soccer
- Danielle Slaton, Women's Soccer
- Steve Nash, Men's Basketball

== Athens 2004 ==
- Aly Wagner, Women's Soccer
- Mary McConneloug, Cycling

== Beijing 2008 ==
- Aly Wagner, Women's Soccer
- Mary McConneloug, Cycling
- Janet Culp, Synchronized Swimming

== Sochi 2014 ==
- Polina Edmunds, Figure Skating

== Rio de Janeiro 2016 ==
- Julie Johnston, Women's Soccer

== Tokyo 2020 ==
- Julie Ertz, Women's Soccer
