= 1920–21 French Rugby Union Championship =

- Countries: France
- Champions: US Perpignan
- Runners-up: Toulouse

The 1920–21 French Rugby Union Championship was won by US Perpignan that beat Toulose in the final.

The Championship, organized before by USFSA (Union des sociétés françaises de sports athlétiques), for the first time was organized by the new Fédération française de rugby.

The Championship was open at the better club of the French regions. After a preliminary round, the eliminatory consisted of semifinals and finals.

== First round ==
Périgueux	-	Bayonne	0 - 5
SA Bordeaux	-	Le Havre	9 - 0
Toulon	-	Perpignan	5 - 21
Saint-Gaudens	-	Agen	12 - 0
Cognac	-	Stadoceste tarbais	0 - 20
Olympique de Paris	-	Lorrain	21 - 3
Béziers	-	Grenoble	6 - 3
SBUC	-	Stade Nantais	-
Racing Paris	-	FC Lyon	22 - 0
Dax	-	Rocherfort	32 - 0
AS Bayonne	-	Poitiers	8 - 0
Brive	-	Toulouse	0 - 9

== Second round ==
Stadoceste tarbais	-	Sa Bordeaux	-
Racing Paris	-	Saint-Gaudens	6 - 0
US Perpignan	-	Olympique de Paris	-
Toulouse	-	AS Bayonne	-
Bayonne	-	Béziers	6 - 0
SBUC	-	Dax	4 - 0

== Semifinals Pool ==
=== Pool A ===
mar.1921	Toulouse	-	Stadoceste tarbais	9 - 3
mar.1921	Toulouse	-	Bayonne	18 - 5
apr.1921	Stadoceste tarbais	-	Bayonne	6 - 3

Ranking: Toulouse 4, Stadoceste 2, Aviron 0

=== Pool B ===
mar. 1921	Racing Paris	-	Perpignan	3 - 5
mar. 1921	Perpignan	-	SBUC	15 - 0
apr. 1921	SBUC	-	Racing Paris	0 - 3

Ranking: US Perpignan 4, Racing 2, Stade bordelais 0

== Final ==
Teams	US Perpignan - Toulose
Score	5-0
Date	17 April 1921
Venue	Stade de Sauclières (Béziers)
Referee	Robert Dussaut
Line-up
US Perpignan	Etienne Cayrol, Raoul Got, Louis Dutrey, René Salinié, Roger Ramis, Joseph Pascot, Joseph Barante, Noël Sicart, Marcel Henric, Fernand Duron, Joseph Marmayou, Fernand Vaquer, Joseph Martorel, Roger Mauran, Louis Argelès
Toulouse	E.Carrouy, Jean Bacquey, Léon Nougal, Alex Bioussa, Joseph Dournac, Henri Galau, Philippe Struxiano, Jean Larrieu, Francis Soubé, J.Berjeaut, Louis Puech, Marcel-Frédéric Lubin-Lebrère, Pierre Pons, Jean Bayard, Alfred Prévost
Scorers
US Perpignan	1 try Duron; 1 conversion de Marmayou
Toulose

== Other competitions ==
In the second division championship, the Hendaye won the title winning against Lancey (Villard-Bonnot) - Narbonne 6 - 0.

In the third division the title went to White Devils (Perpignan) that beat the Gallia Club (Toulouse) 17 - 0.

In the fourth division championship the US Montréjeau beat the Réveil Basco-béarnais (Sucy en Brie) 8 - 3.

In the championship for "second XV", Perpignan beat Racing Paris 21 - 0, at Perpignan the April 3, 1921.

== Sources ==
- Compte rendu de la finale de 1921, sur lnr.fr
- Le Figaro, 1921
- La République du Var, 1921
