= Iguiniz =

Iguiniz is a surname. Notable people with the surname include:

- Aretz Iguiniz (born 1983), French rugby union player
- Emmanuel Iguiniz (1889–1914), French rugby union player
