= Charles Austin (rugby union) =

American rugby union player and coach (1892–1980)

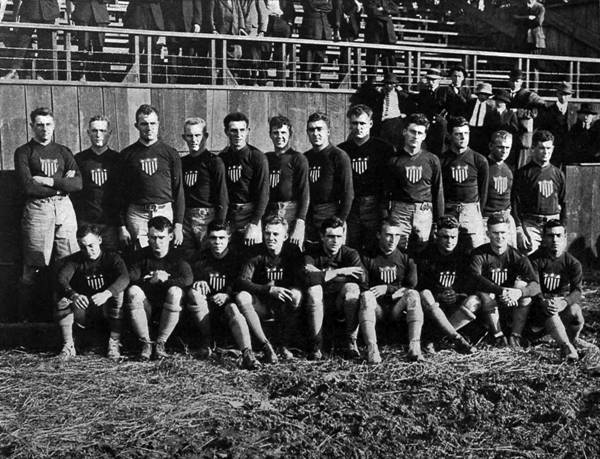
- Austin with the US team in 1912 (pictured front row, first from left)
- Full name: Charles Allphin Austin
- Born: June 3, 1892 Bellingham, Washington, US
- Died: March 15, 1980 (aged 87) Marin, California, US
- School: Berkeley High School
- University: Stanford University

Rugby union career
- Position: Center
Amateur team(s)
Years	Team	Apps	(Points)
c. 1912–1913	Olympic Club RFC		
1913–c. 1916	Stanford University		
- Correct as of November 1, 2018
International career
Years	Team	Apps	(Points)
1912–1913	United States	2	(0)
- Correct as of November 1, 2018
Coaching career
- Years: Team
- 1916: Santa Clara University
- 1924: United States

Charles Allphin Austin (June 3, 1892 – March 15, 1980) was an American rugby union player, official, and coach who played center for the United States men's national team in its first two capped matches in 1912 and 1913. Austin also served as coach of the United States team that won the gold medal at the 1924 Summer Olympics in Paris.

== Biography ==
Charles Austin was born on June 3, 1892, in Bellingham, Washington, the son of William Charles Austin. Austin attended Berkeley High School, where he played for the school's rugby team and was named to a regional all-star team following the 1911 season. By 1912, he had joined the Olympic Club and played in the team's match against Australia during their 1912 tour of the United States and Canada. On November 16, 1912, Austin played for the United States at center in its first capped match—a 12–8 loss to Australia.

In 1913, Austin began attending Stanford University, where he and Daniel Carroll were among the members of the freshman class that played for the university's rugby team. While with the Stanford team, he competed against New Zealand during their 1913 tour of the United States and Canada. On November 15, 1913, Austin returned to the United States team and played again at center in its first test match against New Zealand—a 51–3 defeat.

In 1916, Austin became the coach of the rugby team at Santa Clara University. It was originally announced that he would return to coach the team for the 1917 season, but he did not. Also during the 1916 rugby season, Austin served as head linesman for the California high school state championship game. In 1924, Austin coached the United States national team at the Summer Olympics in Paris—a competition in which the Americans won the gold medal for a second consecutive Games.

On March 15, 1980, Charles Austin died in Marin, California at the age of 87.
