= Sorin Mihăilescu =

Romanian rugby union player

Personal information
- Born: 1898
- Died: April 25, 1943 (aged 44–45) Bucharest, Romania

Sport
- Sport: Rugby union
Medal record
Men's rugby union
Representing Romania
Olympic Games
Bronze medal – third place	1924 Paris	Team

Sorin Mihăilescu (1898 – 25 April 1943) was a Romanian rugby union player. He was part of the Romanian team that won the bronze medal in the rugby tournament at the 1924 Summer Olympics.

== See also ==
- List of Olympic medalists in rugby
