= Soare Sterian =

Romanian rugby union player (1906–1970)

Personal information
- Born: 2 May 1906 Bucharest
- Died: 2 November 1970 (aged 64) Bucharest

Sport
- Sport: Rugby union
Medal record
Men's rugby union
Representing Romania
Olympic Games
Bronze medal – third place	1924 Paris	Team

Soare Sterian (2 May 1906 – 2 November 1970) was a Romanian rugby union player. He was part of the Romanian team that won the bronze medal in the rugby tournament at the 1924 Summer Olympics.

== See also ==
- List of Olympic medalists in rugby
