= Dumitru Volvoreanu =

Romanian rugby union player

Personal information
- Born: 1898

Sport
- Sport: Rugby union
Medal record
Men's rugby union
Representing Romania
Olympic Games
Bronze medal – third place	1924 Paris	Team

Dumitru Volvoreanu (born 1898, date of death unknown) was a Romanian rugby union player. He was part of the Romanian team that won the bronze medal in the rugby tournament at the 1924 Summer Olympics.

== See also ==
- List of Olympic medalists in rugby
