= Eugen Sfetescu =

Romanian rugby union player

Personal information
- Born: May 3, 1907 Bucharest, Romania
- Died: November 16, 1967 (aged 60) Bucharest, Romania

Sport
- Sport: Rugby union
Medal record
Men's rugby union
Representing Romania
Olympic Games
Bronze medal – third place	1924 Paris	Team

Gheorghe Eugeniu Sfetescu (May 3, 1907 – November 16, 1967) was a Romanian rugby union player. He was part of the Romanian team that won the bronze medal in the rugby tournament at the 1924 Summer Olympics. His brother, Mircea Sfetescu, also competed.

== See also ==
- List of Olympic medalists in rugby
