= Teodor Marian =

Romanian rugby union player

Personal information
- Born: 1904
- Died: 4 September 1928 (aged 23–24)

Sport
- Sport: Rugby union
Medal record
Men's rugby union
Representing Romania
Olympic Games
Bronze medal – third place	1924 Paris	Team

Teodor Marian (1904 – 4 September 1928) was a Romanian rugby union player who was part of the Romanian team that won the bronze medal in the rugby tournament at the 1924 Summer Olympics.

== See also ==
- List of Olympic medalists in rugby
