= Jean Vaysse =

French rugby union player

- Born: 28 April 1900 Albi, France
- Died: 17 October 1974 (aged 74) Albi, France

Rugby union career
- Position: -
International career
| Years | Team | Apps | (Points) |
| 1924 | France | | |
Medal record
Men's rugby union
Representing France
Olympic Games
| Silver medal – second place | 1924 Paris | Team |

Jean Vaysse (28 April 1900 – 17 October 1974) was a French rugby union player who competed in the 1924 Summer Olympics. He was born in Albi and died in Albi. In 1924 he won the silver medal as member of the French team.
