= René Araou =

French rugby union player

- Born: 18 October 1902 Narbonne
- Died: 8 January 1955 (aged 52) Narbonne
- Height: 5 ft 10 in (1.78 m)
- Weight: 215 lb (98 kg; 15 st 5 lb)

Rugby union career
- Position(s): Prop, Lock
International career
Years	Team	Apps	(Points)
1924	France 7s	1	
Medal record
Men's rugby union
Representing France
Olympic Games
Silver medal – second place	1924 Paris	Team competition

René Araou (18 October 1902 – 8 January 1955) was a French rugby union player who competed in the 1924 Summer Olympics. He was born in Narbonne. In 1924 he won the silver medal as member of the French team.
