= Dink Templeton =

American sportsman (1897–1962)

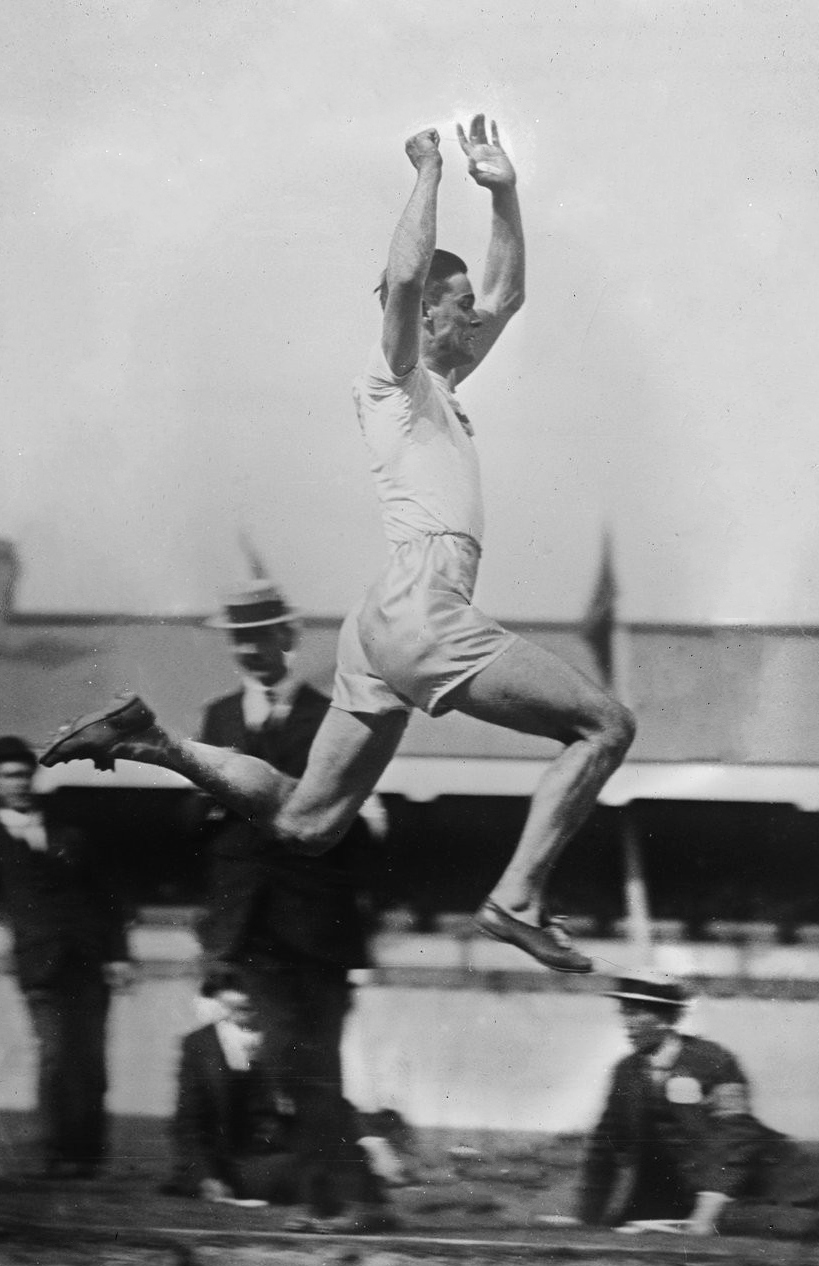
- Templeton at the 1920 Olympics

Personal information
- Full name: Robert Lyman Templeton
- Born: May 27, 1897 Helena, Montana, U.S.
- Died: August 7, 1962 (aged 65) Palo Alto, California, U.S.
- Height: 5 ft 10 in (178 cm)
- Weight: 165 lb (75 kg)

Sport
- Sport: Athletics, rugby union
- Events: Long jump, high jump, pole vault, hurdles
- Club: Stanford Cardinal

Achievements and titles
- Personal bests: LJ – 7.085 m (1920); HJ – 1.935 m (1920); 110 mH – 15.6 (1914)
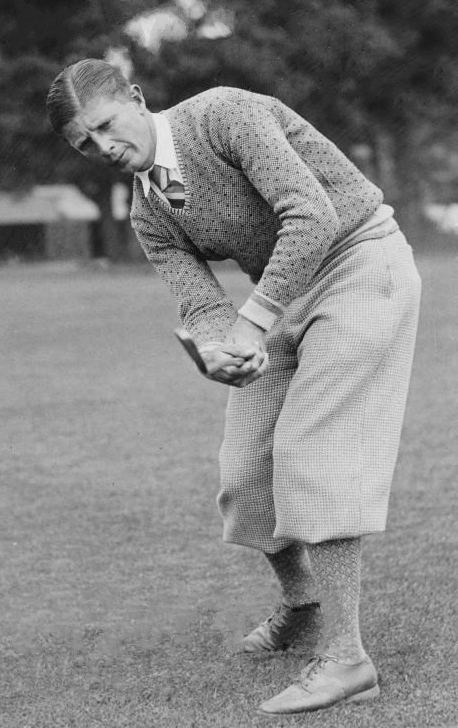
- Templeton in 1929

Rugby union career
- Position: Fullback
Amateur team(s)
| Years | Team | Apps | (Points) |
- Olympic Club RFC
International career
| Years | Team | Apps | (Points) |
| 1920 | USA | 1 | (5) |
Medal record
Men's rugby union
Representing the United States
Olympic Games
| Gold medal – first place | 1920 Antwerp | Team |

Robert Lyman "Dink" Templeton (May 27, 1897 – August 7, 1962) was an American track and field athlete, Olympic gold medalist in rugby union, college football player, and track coach.

== Personal ==
Templeton was born in Helena, Montana, and attended Palo Alto High School in Palo Alto, California. He attended Stanford University, where he played on the football and rugby union teams. He received both his undergraduate and law degrees from Stanford.

== Olympics ==
In 1920, Templeton was on the United States Olympic team in rugby and the long jump. He was handicapped in his best event, the high jump, because he normally used the Western roll jumping style, which was considered illegal at that time. In the long jump, he finished out of the medals in fourth place, but the U.S. rugby team upset France to win the gold medal.

== Track coach ==
In 1922, Templeton returned to Stanford as its track coach, a position he held until 1939. During his tenure as coach, Stanford won the NCAA Men's Outdoor Track and Field Championship in 1925, 1928, and 1934, and Stanford athletes won 19 individual titles. He was noted at the time for conducting intensive daily practices, an uncommon practice at that time. He later coached at the Olympic Club in San Francisco.

== Later life ==
Templeton also had a career as a journalist and broadcaster. For his coaching, he was inducted into the USA Track & Field Hall of Fame in 1976, and is a member of the Stanford Athletic Hall of Fame in recognition of his coaching and as a football player.
