= Clément Dupont =

French rugby union player

Olympic medal record

Men's Rugby union
Silver medal – second place	1924 Paris	Team

Clément Dupont (11 April 1899 – 1 November 1993) was a French rugby union player who competed in the 1924 Summer Olympics. He was born in Argelès-Gazost and died in Bordeaux. In 1924 he won the silver medal as a member of the French team.
