= Louis Béguet =

France international rugby union player

Olympic medal record

Men's Rugby union
Silver medal – second place	1924 Paris	Team

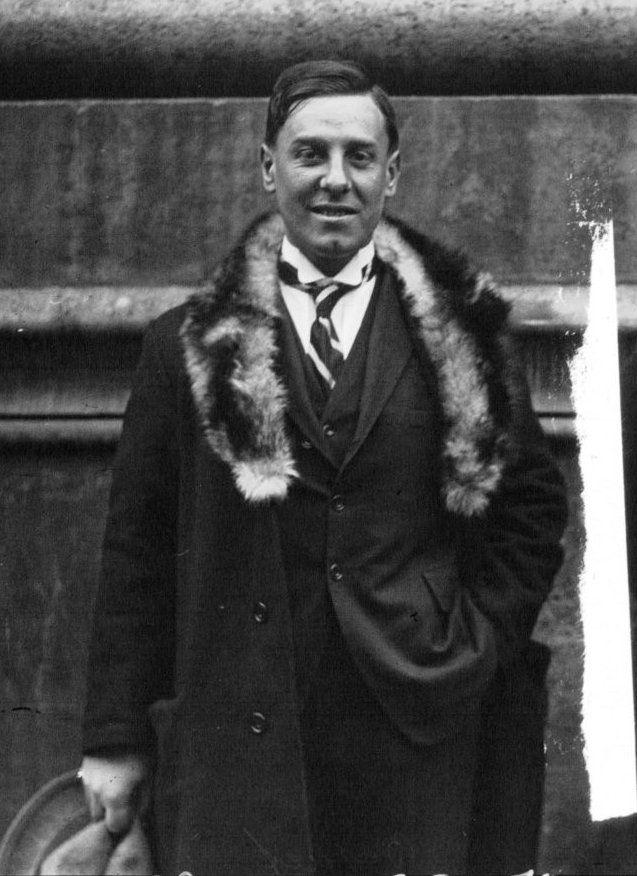

Louis Béguet (7 December 1894 – 2 March 1983) was a French rugby union player who competed in the 1924 Summer Olympics. He was born in Neuf-Mesnil, Nord and died in Nantes. In 1924 he won the silver medal as member of the French team.
