= Gheorghe Benția =

Romania international rugby union player

- Born: 1 July 1897 Pitești, Kingdom of Romania
- Died: 1 September 1975 (aged 78)

Rugby union career
- Position: Wing
International career
Years	Team	Apps	(Points)
1919-1924	Romania	4	
Medal record
Men's rugby union
Representing Romania
Olympic Games
Bronze medal – third place	1924 Paris	Team

Gheorghe Benția (1 July 1897 – 1 September 1975) was a Romanian rugby union player. He played as a wing.

He had 4 caps for Romania, from 1919 to 1924, without ever scoring. His first game was a 21–0 loss to the United States, for the Inter-Allied Games, in Paris. He played both games at the 1924 Olympic Tournament, where Romania reached the 3rd place, winning his first ever bronze medal. He was never capped again for his National Team.

== See also ==
- List of Romania national rugby union players
