= Albert Dupouy =

French rugby union player

Olympic medal record

Men's Rugby union
Silver medal – second place	1924 Paris	Team

Albert Dupouy (French pronunciation: [albɛʁ dypwi]; 21 February 1901 – 1 December 1973) was a French rugby union player who competed in the 1924 Summer Olympics. In 1924 he won the silver medal as member of the French team.
