= Jean Bayard =

France international rugby union player

Olympic medal record

Men's Rugby union
| Silver medal – second place | 1924 Paris | Team |

Jean Bayard (23 October 1897 in Toulouse – 11 March 1995) was a French rugby union player who competed in the 1924 Summer Olympics. In 1924 he won the silver medal as member of the French team.
