= Adolphe Bousquet =

French rugby union player

Olympic medal record

Men's Rugby union
Silver medal – second place	1920 Antwerp	Team
Silver medal – second place	1924 Paris	Team

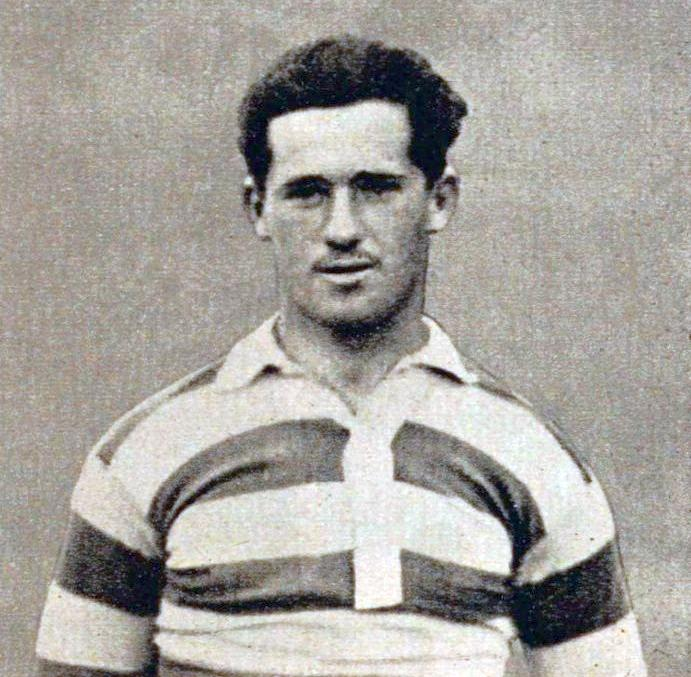
Adolphe Bousque (1922)

Adolphe René Bousquet (14 August 1899 – 17 March 1972) was a French rugby union player who competed in the 1920 Summer Olympics and in the 1924 Summer Olympics. He was born in Béziers and died in Béziers. He won the silver medal as a member of the French team in 1920 and 1924.
