= Étienne Piquiral =

French rugby union player

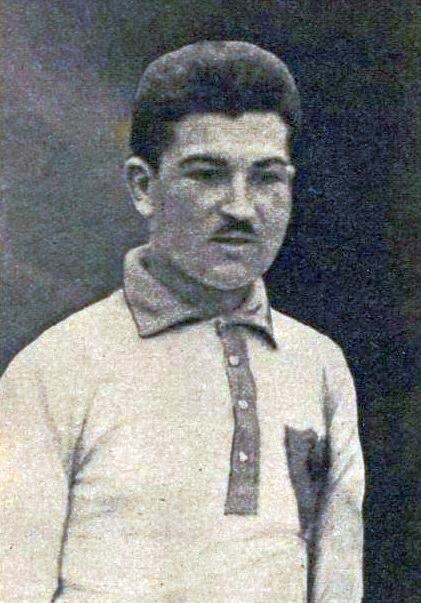
- Born: June 15, 1901 Perpignan
- Died: March 13, 1945 (aged 43) Lübeck, Germany

Rugby union career
- Position: -
International career
Years	Team	Apps	(Points)
1924	France		
Medal record
Men's rugby union
Representing France
Olympic Games
Silver medal – second place	1924 Paris	Team

Étienne Piquiral (June 15, 1901 – March 13, 1945) was a French rugby union player who competed in the 1924 Summer Olympics. He was born in Perpignan and died in a prisoner-of-war camp during World War II.

In 1924 he won the silver medal as member of the French team.
