= Teodor Florian =

Romanian rugby union player

- Born: 1 July 1899

Rugby union career
- Position: Fullback
International career
Years	Team	Apps	(Points)
1924–1927	Romania	4	
Medal record
Men's rugby union
Representing Romania
Olympic Games
Bronze medal – third place	1924 Paris	Team competition

Teodor Florian (born 1 July 1899; date of death unknown) was a Romanian rugby union footballer. He played as a fullback.

Florian had 4 caps for Romania, with a penalty scored, 3 points in aggregate. His first match was a 59–3 loss to France, on 4 May 1924, at the 1924 Olympic Tournament, and his last came with the 6–0 loss to Germany, on 19 May 1927, in Heidelberg, in a friendly match.

Florian career highest point was his presence at the Romania team that reached the 3rd place at the 1924 Summer Olympics, even losing to France (59–3) and the United States (39–0). He had the honour of scoring his country only points at the tournament as he kicked the penalty that gave Romania a 17–3 result at the half time of the game with the host nation.

== See also ==
- List of Romania national rugby union players
