= Olympic Club RFC =

US rugby union club, based in San Francisco, CA

Olympic
- Full name: Olympic Club Rugby Football Club
- Union: USA Rugby
- Nickname: Winged 'O' ruggers
- Founded: 1908; 118 years ago
- League: Pacific Rugby Premiership
Team kit

The Olympic Club RFC is a Pacific Rugby Premiership team based in San Francisco, California, and was the 2019 Division II USA national champions. Known as the OC, or the Winged 'O' ruggers, the rugby team was formed in 1908 under the wing of the San Francisco Olympic Club, an athletic club and private social club which had been founded in 1860.

Olympic Club Rugby is one of the oldest rugby clubs in California and has produced a number of notable players who have represented the United States national team. These include Olympic gold medal winners from 1920 and 1924, Charles Doe, Dink Templeton, George Dixon, and Rudy Scholz.

More recent U.S. Eagles representatives include Brian McClenahan and Colin Hawley.

== History ==
=== Early years ===
The game of rugby in the Bay Area received a boost in 1906 when, citing concerns about the safety of American football, the universities of California and Stanford dropped football in favor of rugby. The Big Game was played as rugby from 1906 to 1914.

In 1907 an Englishman and rugby devotee named Edgar Pomeroy joined the San Francisco Olympic Club and lobbied for the formation of a rugby team. With the support of the club president and the board, the Olympic Club rugby team was formed in 1908, playing five other teams including Stanford and University of California in the first season. The club won the local championship the next season, in 1909.

Pomeroy and fellow Olympic Club member Joseph Hickey became officials with the California Rugby Union. They arranged a series of touring matches to the West Coast for New Zealand's All Blacks team in 1913. On October 4, the Olympic Club played the champion All Blacks side at St. Ignatius Field. While the OC lost 19–0 it was a closer match than the game played a month later in which the United States national side was defeated 51–3. New Zealander Jim Wylie stayed in California after the tour, later joining the Olympic Club and becoming a coach of the side. The colleges resumed playing American football after 1914 but rugby had gained a toehold in the Bay Area.
