= Mircea Sfetescu =

Romanian rugby union player

- Born: 4 January 1905 Bucharest, Kingdom of Romania
- Died: January 1987 (aged 81–82)

Rugby union career
- Position: Centre
International career
Years	Team	Apps	(Points)
1924-1927	Romania	4	
Medal record
Men's rugby union
Representing Romania
Olympic Games
Bronze medal – third place	1924 Paris	Team competition

Mircea Sfetescu (4 January 1905 – January 1987) was a Romanian rugby union player. He played as a centre. He had 4 caps for Romania, from 1924 to 1927. He played the two games at the 1924 Olympic tournament, where Romania, even losing to France and the United States, won the 3rd place for the first ever Bronze medal of his country at the Summer Olympic Games. His brother Eugen Sfetescu also represented Romania at the 1924 Olympics.

== See also ==
- List of Romania national rugby union players
