= Aimé Cassayet-Armagnac =

France international rugby union player

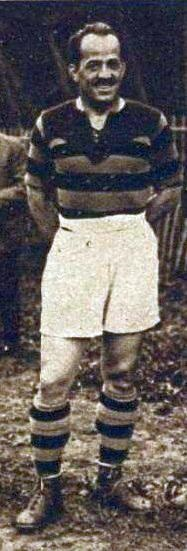
- Born: 9 April 1893 Tarbes, France
- Died: 26 May 1927 (aged 34) Narbonne, France
- Height: 6 ft 0 in (1.83 m)
- Weight: 193 lb (88 kg)

Rugby union career
- Position(s): Lock, No. 8
International career
Years	Team	Apps	(Points)
1920-1927	France	31	(9)
Medal record
Men's rugby union
Representing France
Olympic Games
Silver medal – second place	1924 Paris	Team competition

Aimé Cassayet-Armagnac (9 April 1893 – 26 May 1927) was a French rugby union player who competed in the 1924 Summer Olympics. He was born in Tarbes and died suddenly in Narbonne after suffering acute peritonitis followed by meningitis. In 1924 he won the silver medal as a member of the French team.
