= Gilbert Gérintès =

French rugby union player

Olympic medal record

Men's Rugby union
| Silver medal – second place | 1924 Paris | Team |

Gilbert Gérintès (16 August 1902, Saint-Étienne – 15 May 1968) was a French rugby union player who competed in the 1924 Summer Olympics. In 1924, he won the silver medal as member of the French team. He played three Test matches between 1924 and 1926, as well as two Five Nations Championship matches in 1925 and 1926.
