= Étienne Bonnes =

French rugby union player

Medal record

Men's rugby union

Representing France

Olympic Games
Silver medal – second place	1924 Paris	Team

Étienne Bonnes (16 September 1894 – 20 February 1941) was a French rugby union player who competed in the 1924 Summer Olympics. In 1924 he won the silver medal as member of the French team.
