= George Dixon (rugby union) =

American rugby union player

Olympic medal record

Men's rugby union

Representing the United States
Gold medal – first place	1924 Paris	Team competition

George Martin Dixon (April 10, 1901 – August 23, 1991) was an American rugby union player who competed in the 1924 Summer Olympics. Dixon was born in Vallejo, California. He played rugby for the Olympic Club RFC in San Francisco, and was a member of the American rugby union team which won the Olympic gold medal in Paris.
