= Rugby union at the 1924 Summer Olympics =

Men's rugby union at the Games of the VIII Olympiad
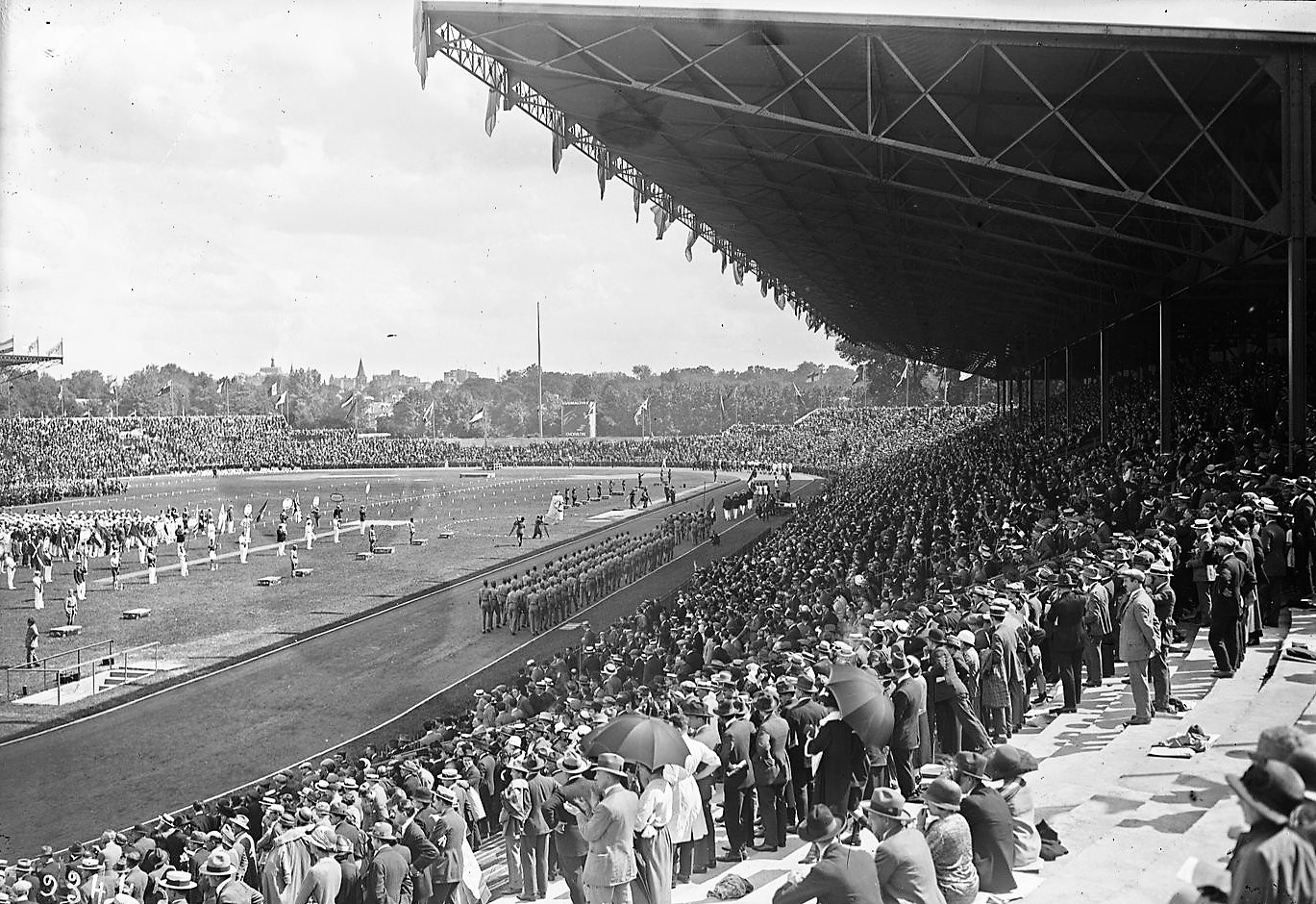
- The Olympic Stadium hosted all matches
- Venue: Olympic Stadium, Colombes
- Dates: 4 – 18 May
- Competitors: 54 from 3 nations

Medalists
| 1st place, gold medalist(s) | | United States |
| 2nd place, silver medalist(s) | | France |
| 3rd place, bronze medalist(s) | | Romania |

In rugby union at the 1924 Summer Olympics held in Paris, the United States won the gold medal, beating France in an upset in front of a partisan crowd.

All the matches were played at Olympic Stadium of Colombes. It was the last time rugby was played at a Summer Olympics until rugby sevens was introduced in 2016.

== Entries ==
In September 1923, the U.S. Olympic Committee agreed to send an American rugby team to the 1924 Paris Olympics. The French Olympic Committee (FOC) had scheduled the rugby event to kick off the 1924 Paris Games, and Romania and the USA were expected to provide only token opposition for the European Champions. France was picked to win the gold medal in grand style.

== USA arrival ==
The USA Olympic rugby team arrived in Paris, via England on 27 April 1924, after a 6,000-mile journey by train, bus, ship, and ferry from Oakland, California. The team was the target of hostility even before the players set foot on French soil. In the port of Boulogne immigration officials refused the U.S. team entry, and the players – many of whom had been seasick during the turbulent crossing – spent over 12 hours waiting for the officials to resolve the situation.

== France versus Romania ==
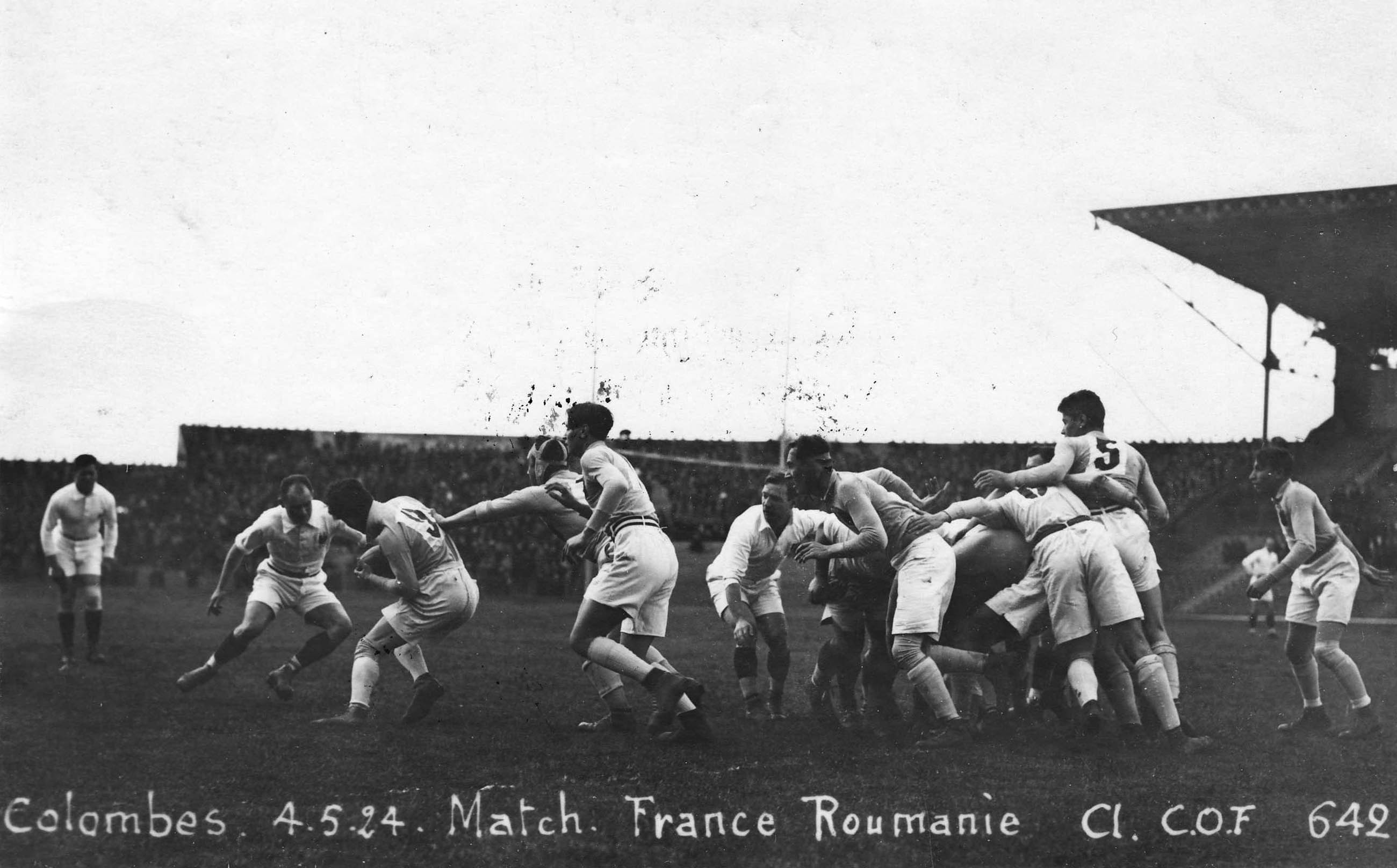
Scene of the France v Romania match

The Olympic games of 1924 opened on 4 May with a match between France and Romania. Playing its first fifteen, the French notched a 59 to 3 victory over the smaller eastern European team, scoring 13 tries including four by the fine Stade Français Paris winger Adolphe Jauréguy.

After the match, another round of trouble started over the referee for the France – USA match. The dispute degraded into the French no longer providing any practice fields for the team, so the Americans found themselves a park in the outskirts of a city. Fanning the flames, the French press published an article by a Paris City Counselor criticizing the U.S. team. The Americans invited the Frenchman to come down to the pitch to discuss the matter. To make matters worse, an argument started over the French Olympic Committee's ruling that the American side could not film their match against Romania that weekend. A French company had been awarded sole rights to filming the Olympics, and an American request to film the match was flatly denied. A meeting on the 8th did not resolve the issue, so Sam Goodman told the French organizers that the US might pull out of the Games.

Adding fuel to the fire, the American players' clothes were robbed during that day's training session. Even though a French attendant had been posted, the team lost about $4,000 worth of cash and possessions. Cleaveland and his teammates were not very happy, and because of their treatment in the press, the American side was now being cursed and spat on in the streets of Paris. The French press now whipped up fierce anti-American sentiment in Paris.

== USA versus Romania ==
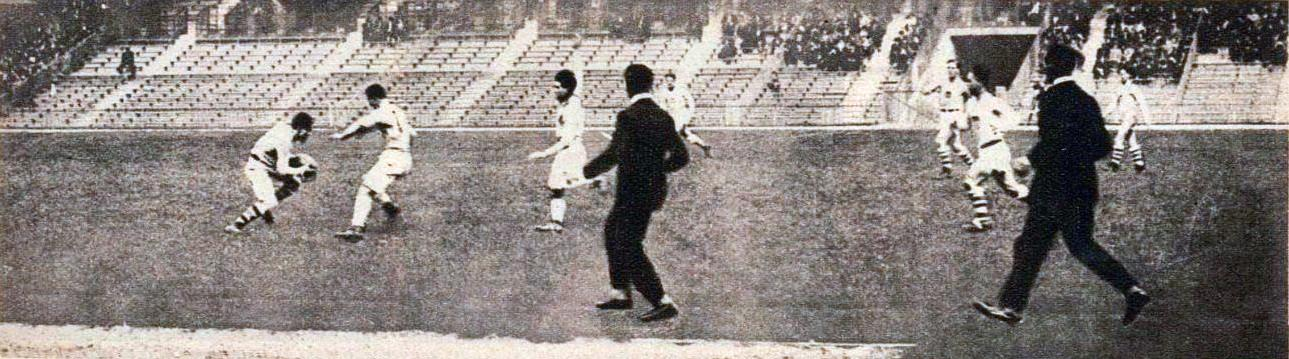
United States player Charles Doe with the ball v Romania

On Sunday, 11 May, the US defeated Romania at Colombes Stadium. With Norman at flyhalf, Richard Hyland at center, and Jack Patrick at flanker.

Fullback Charlie Doe had a good day kicking, scoring 13 points. With the impressive win, though, a difficult situation was brewing. Each time the Americans touched the ball, the French crowd of about 6000 booed and hissed. Conversely, they cheered and screamed each time the Romanians gained any possession. And though everyone felt that the Americans would play a harsh, physical match, both the American and French sporting press noted the lack of violence and the skilled nature of US play, coupled with their size and fitness.

Some of the French press even conceded that the fans had been unfair at the match. Still the odds were set at 5 to 1 against the US with a 20-point spread in the upcoming match with France. Two days later, the issue over the final's referee was settled when Albert Freethy of Wales was selected.

== The final ==
What we do best without knives or guns

— Unknown, 1924 : le rugby banni des Jeux olympiques après la « Corrida de Colombes », https://www.retronews.fr/sports-et-loisirs/echo-de-presse/2019/09/19/rugby-banni-des-jeux-olympiques

During the final between France and the United States at Colombes Stadium, French fans booed and hissed the American team. French fans threw bottles and rocks onto the field and at American players and officials, wild brawls broke out in the stands, U.S. spectator Gideon Nelson was knocked unconscious after being hit in the face by a walking stick, and French fans invaded the pitch at the final whistle, leaving the police to protect the Americans. At the medal ceremony, The Star-Spangled Banner was drowned out by the booing and hissing of French fans, and the American team had to be escorted to their locker room under police protection.

== Results ==
4 May

| France | 59–3 | Romania |
| Try: Beguet, Behoteguy (2), Dupouy (3), Etcheverry, Gerintes, Got (2), Jaureguy (4); Con: Beguet (7); Pen: Beguet, Behoteguy | Report | Try: Tudor |

Stade Olympique, Colombes

11 May

| United States | 37–0 | Romania |
| Try: Patrick (3), Hyland (4), Cleveland; Con: Doe (5); Pen: Doe | Report |

Stade Olympique, Colombes

18 May
16:30

| France | 3–17 | United States |
| Try: Galau | Report | Try: Patrick, Rogers, Farrish (2), Mannelli; Con: Doe |

Stade Olympique, Colombes
Attendance: 30,000
Referee: Albert Freethy (Wales)

Team details

| France | USA |

| Jean Etcheberry | FB | 1 | FB | Caesar Mannelli |
| Jean Bayard | W | 2 | W | Ed Graff |
| Louis Béguet | C | 3 | C | John O'Neil |
| Aimé Cassayet-Armagnac | C | 4 | C | Alan Valentine |
| M.F. Lubin-Lebrère | W | 5 | W | Linn Farrish |
| Alexandre Bioussa | FH | 6 | FH | Colby Slater |
| René Lasserre (c) | SH | 7 | SH | Dudley DeGroot |
| Étienne Piquiral | F | 8 | F | John Patrick |
| Clément Dupont | F | 9 | F | Rudy Scholz |
| Henri Galau | F | 10 | L | Robert Devereux |
| Raoul Got | L | 11 | L | George Dixon |
| Jean Vaysse | L | 12 | L | Richard Hyland |
| André Béhotéguy | H | 13 | P | Norman Cleaveland |
| Adolphe Jauréguy | H | 14 | H | Lefty Rogers |
| Étienne Bonnes | P | 15 | WF | Charles Doe |

== Final ranking ==
| Rank | Team | Matches | Points | Avg points | Tries | Avg tries |
|---|---|---|---|---|---|---|
| 1st place, gold medalist(s) | United States | 2 | 54 | 27 | 9 | 4.5 |
| 2nd place, silver medalist(s) | France | 2 | 62 | 31 | 19 | 9.5 |
| 3rd place, bronze medalist(s) | Romania | 2 | 3 | 1.5 | 1 | 0.5 |

== Rosters ==
Complete list of players:

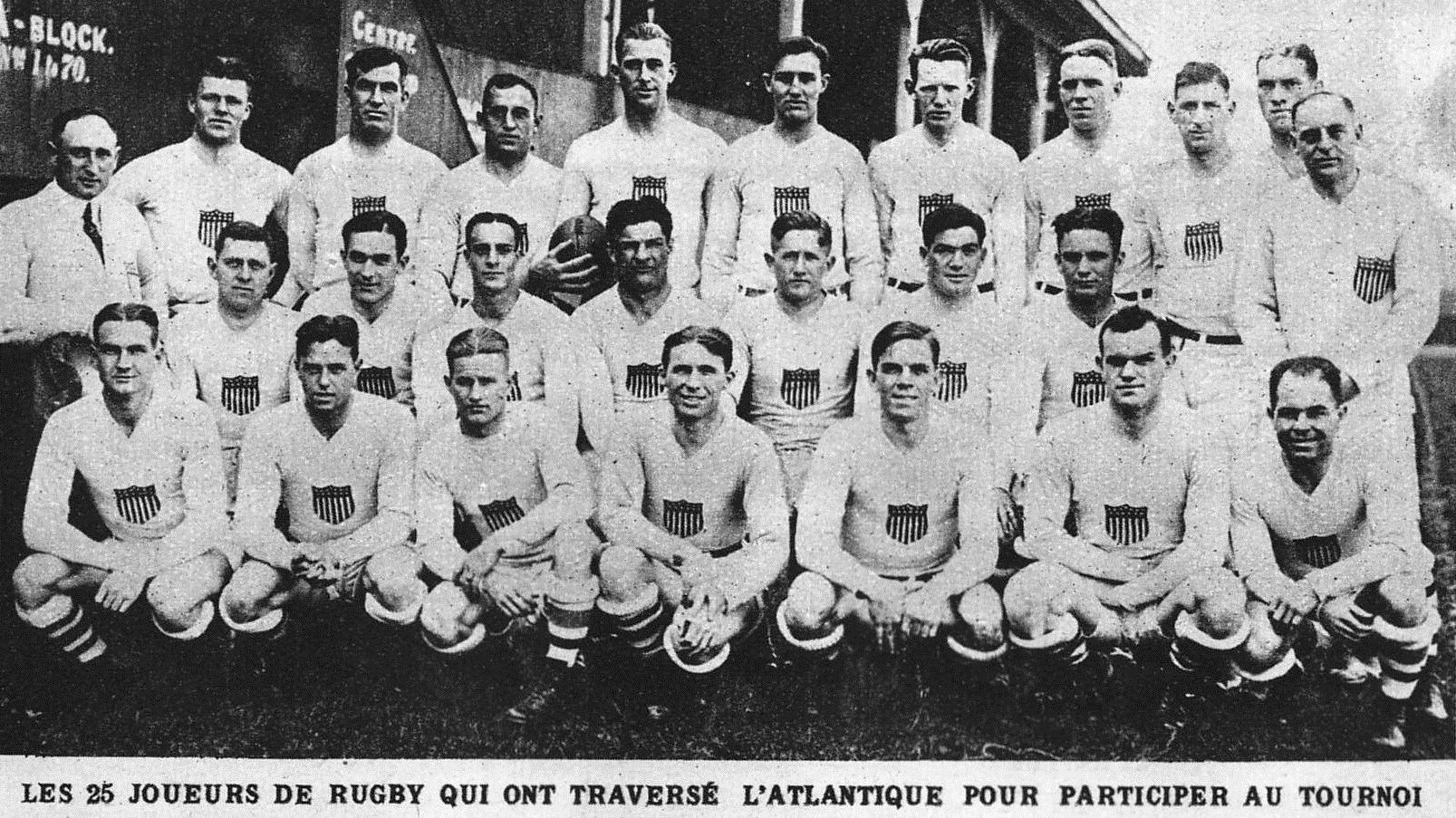
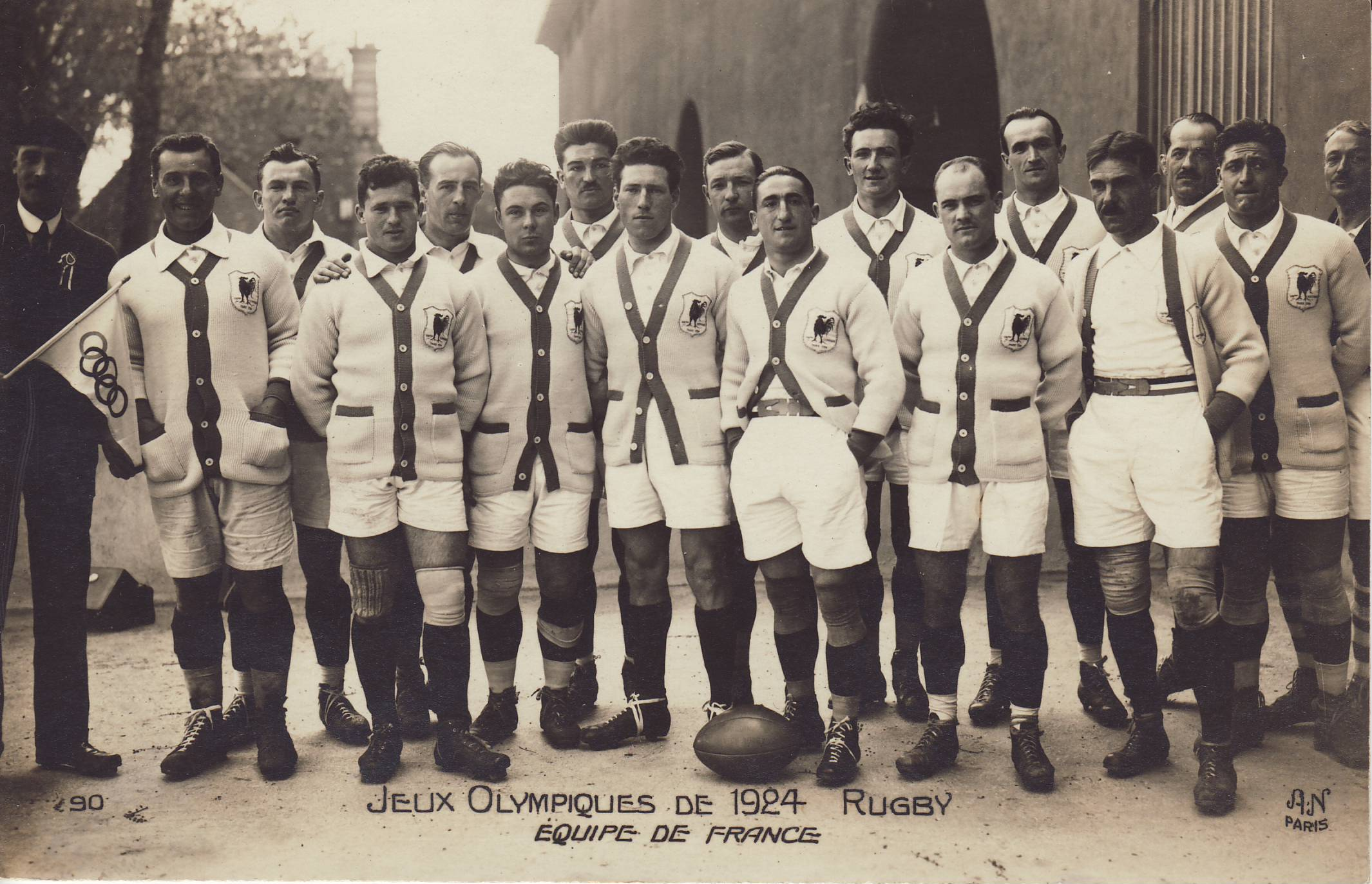
United States (above) and France, gold and silver medal respectively

| Gold | Silver | Bronze |
|---|---|---|
| United States Coach: Charles Austin; R. Brown; John Cashel; Philip Clark; Norman Cleaveland; Hugh Cunningham; Dudley DeGroot; Robert Devereux; George Dixon; Charles Doe; Linn Farrish; Edward Graff; Charles Grondona; Joseph Hunter; Richard Hyland; Caesar Mannelli; Charles Mehan; John Muldoon; William Muldoon; John O'Neil; John Patrick; William Rogers; Rudolph Scholz; Colby Slater; Norman Slater; Charles Lee Tilden, Jr. Edward Turkington; Alan Valentine; Alan Williams | France Fernande Abraham; René Araou; Jean Bayard; Louis Béguet; André Béhotéguy; Marcel Besson; Alexandre Bioussa; Étienne Bonnes; François Borde; Adolphe Bousquet; Aimé Cassayet-Armagnac; Etienne Cayrol; François Clauzel; Clément Dupont; Albert Dupouy; Jean Etcheberry; Ernest Frayssinet; Henri Galau; Gilbert Gérintès; Charles Gonnet; Raoul Got; Adolphe Jauréguy; René Lasserre; Louis Lepatey; Marcel-Frédéric Lubin-Lebrère; Camille Montade; Roger Piteu; Étienne Piquiral; Eugène Ribère; Jean Vaysse | Romania Nicolae Anastasiade; Dumitru Armăşel; Gheorghe Benția; Ion Cociociaho; Constantin Cratunescu; Teodor Florian; Petre Ghiţulescu; Ion Gîrleşteanu; Octav Luchide; Jean Henry Manu; Nicolae Mărăscu; Teodor Marian; Sorin Mihăilescu; Paul Nedelcovici; Iosif Nemes; Eugen Sfetescu; Mircea Sfetescu; Soare Sterian; Mircea Stroescu; Atanasie Tănăsescu; Mihai Vardală; Paul Vidraşcu; Dumitru Volvoreanu |
