= Richard Hyland (rugby union) =

American rugby union player (1900–1981)

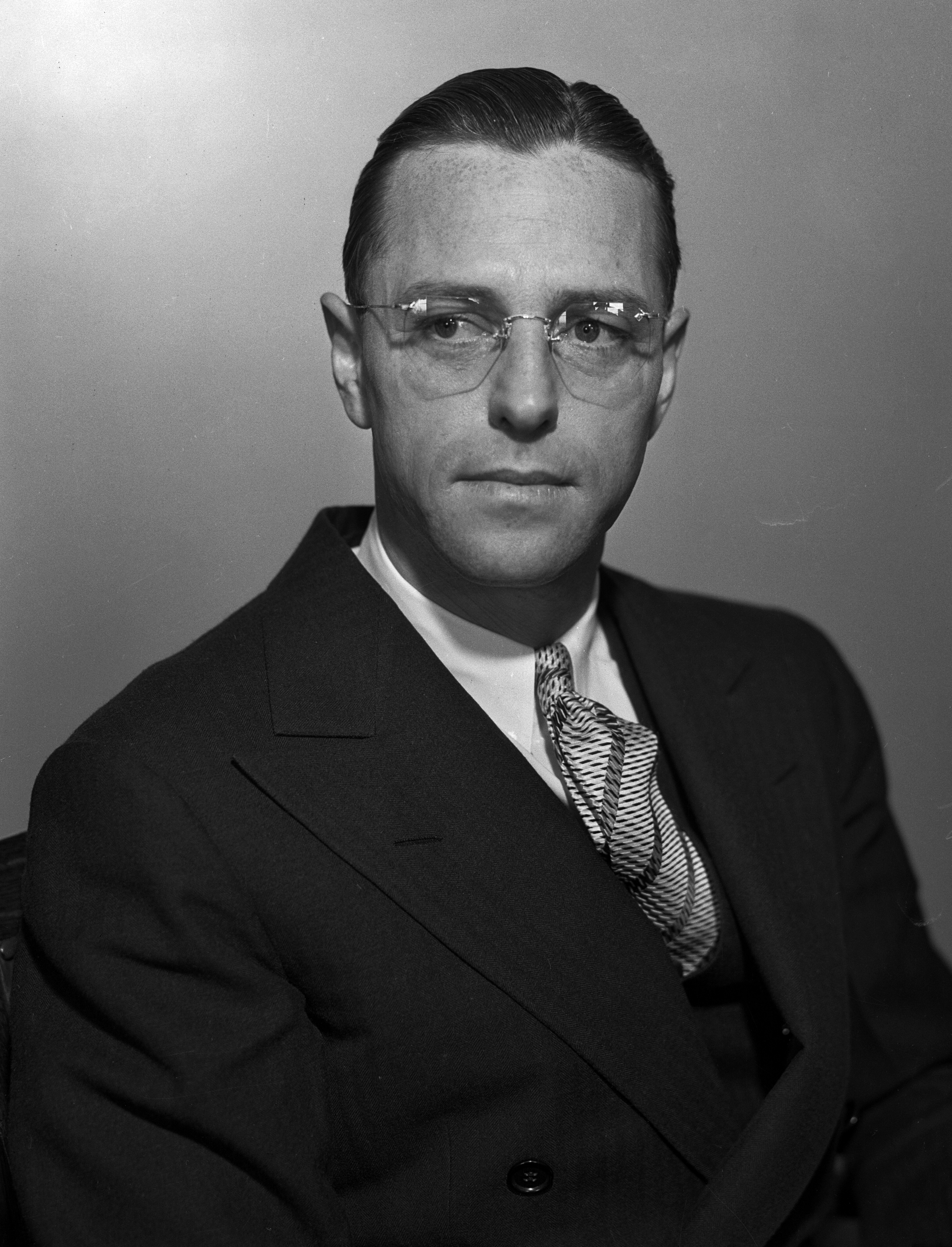
- Hyland in 1935

Medal record

Men's rugby union

Representing the United States

Olympic Games
| Gold medal – first place | 1924 Paris | Team competition |

Richard Frank "Dick" Hyland (July 26, 1900 – July 16, 1981) was an American rugby union player who competed in the 1924 Summer Olympics. He was a member of the American rugby union team, which won the gold medal.

Hyland also played college football at Stanford University, and went on to become a sportswriter for the Los Angeles Times.
