= Edward Graff =

American rugby union player

Medal record

Men's rugby union

Representing the United States

Olympic Games
Gold medal – first place	1924 Paris	Team competition

Edward Graff (August 20, 1897 – March 19, 1954) was an American rugby union player who competed in the 1924 Summer Olympics. He was born in San Francisco, California. Graff was a member of the American rugby union team, which won the gold medal.
