= William Rogers (rugby union) =

American rugby union player

Medal record

Men's rugby union

Representing the United States

Olympic Games
Gold medal – first place	1924 Paris	Team competition

William Lister "Lefty" Rogers (February 6, 1902 – November 13, 1987) was an American rugby union player who competed with the team in the 1924 Summer Olympics when it won the gold medal. He graduated from Stanford University in 1923 and then went on to get his M.D. in 1926 from the same university; in 1966 he became a member of the university's board of trustees. He became one of the founding members of the American Board of Thoracic Surgery. Besides rugby he also played basketball at Stanford.
