= Norman Slater =

American rugby union player

Medal record

Men's rugby union

Representing the United States

Olympic Games
| Gold medal – first place | 1924 Paris | Team competition |

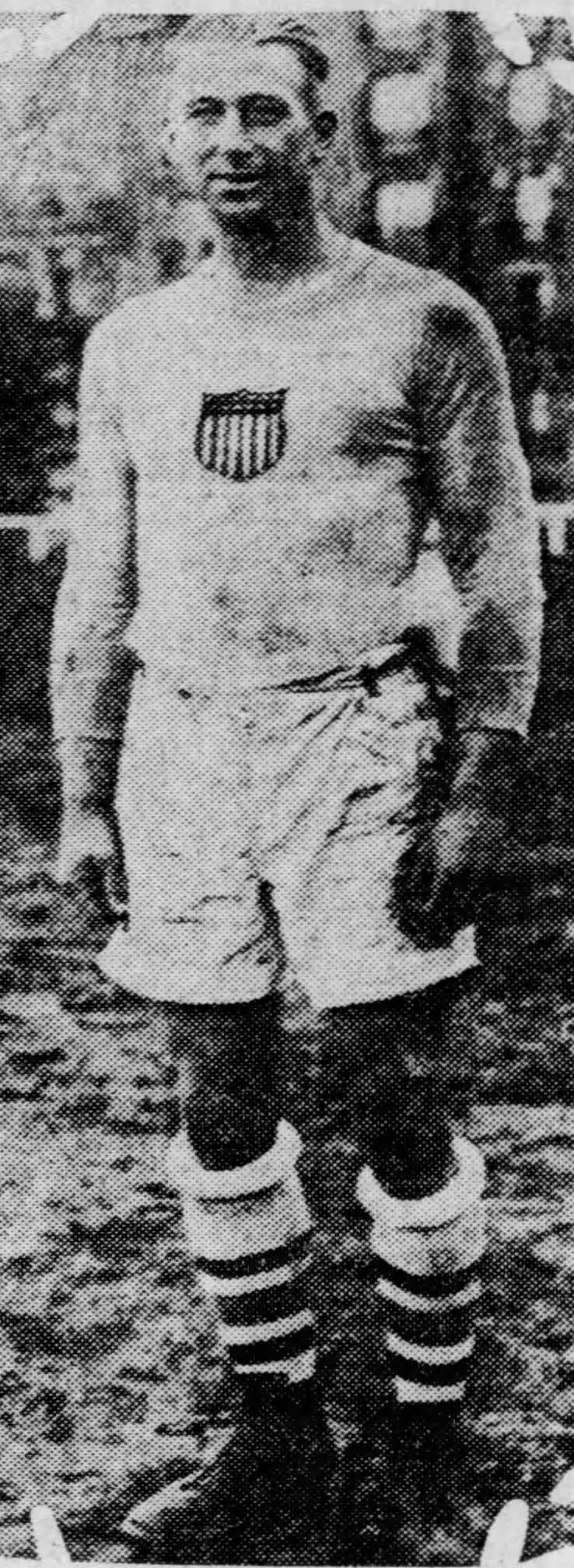
Slater at 1924 Summer Olympics

Norman Bernard Slater (January 23, 1894 – March 1, 1979) was an American rugby union player who competed in the 1924 Summer Olympics. He was a member of the American rugby union team, which won the gold medal, and younger brother of team captain Colby 'Babe' Slater.
