= Jean Etcheberry =

French rugby union player

Olympic medal record

Men's Rugby union
Silver medal – second place	1924 Paris	Team

Jean Etcheberry (27 August 1901 – 5 February 1982) was a French rugby union player who competed in the 1924 Summer Olympics. He was born in Vieux-Boucau-les-Bains and died in Les Côtes-d'Arey, Isère. In 1924 he won the silver medal as member of the French team.
