= Alan Williams (rugby union) =

American rugby union player (1893–1984)

Medal record

Men's rugby union

Representing the United States

Olympic Games
Gold medal – first place	1924 Paris	Team competition

Alan Frank Williams (October 7, 1893 – December 3, 1984) was an American rugby union player who was a graduate of Cornell University class of 1915. Williams was a member of the American rugby union team which won the gold medal at the 1924 Summer Olympics. He was born in West Orange, New Jersey and died in Los Angeles, California.
