= François Poeydebasque =

France international rugby union player

- Born: 7 January 1891 Bayonne, France
- Died: 21 September 1914 (aged 23) Crannelle, France

Rugby union career
- Position(s): Centre, Fly-half
International career
Years	Team	Apps	(Points)
- France

François Poeydebasque (7 January 1891 - 21 September 1914) was a rugby union player who represented France twice, at home to Ireland and away to Wales in 1914. He played as a centre and as a scrum-half for Aviron Bayonnais. He was killed in the First World War.
