= Philip Clark (rugby union) =

American rugby union player

Olympic medal record

Men's rugby union

Representing the United States
| Gold medal – first place | 1924 Paris | Team competition |

Philip Corriston Clark (September 18, 1898–December 16, 1985) was an American rugby union player who competed in the 1924 Summer Olympics. He was a member of the American rugby union team, which won the gold medal.
