= René Lasserre =

France international rugby union player & Olympic athlete

Olympic medal record

Men's Rugby union
Silver medal – second place	1924 Paris	Team

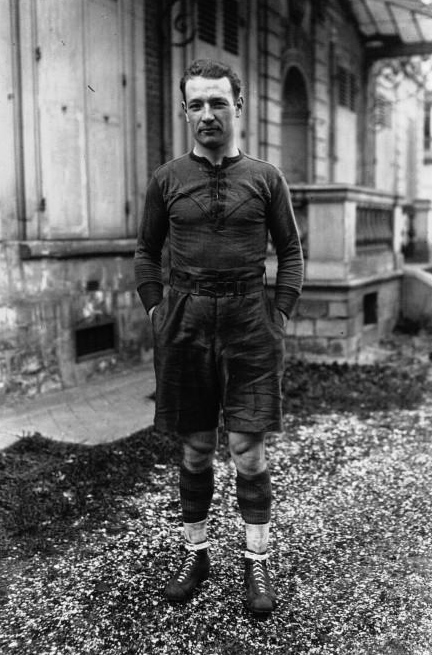

Félix "René" Lasserre (9 October 1895 – 19 August 1965) was a French rugby union player who competed in the 1924 Summer Olympics. He was born in Bayonne and died in Saint-Avold. In 1924 he won the silver medal as member of the French team.
