= Norman Cleaveland =

American rugby union player

Olympic medal record

Men's rugby union

Representing the United States
| Gold medal – first place | 1924 Paris | Team competition |

Norman Cleaveland (April 4, 1901 – June 8, 1997) was an American rugby union player who competed in the 1924 Summer Olympics.

== Biography ==
Cleaveland was born in California, but spent a considerable portion of his youth growing up on his family's ranch outside of Datil, New Mexico. He was a standout athlete for Stanford University when he became a member of the American rugby union team which won the gold medal in Paris at the very start of the 1924 Summer Olympics. Known as 'Peabody' by his teammates, because that was what he called everyone else, he stayed on in France after the rugby concluded in order to attend the rest of the games.

After graduating from Stanford with a degree in mining engineering, Cleaveland began a long and respected career specializing in dredge operations. During World War II he took a break from mining and served as an Army Air Corps pilot in the US and then immediately after the war in Korea and Manchuria as part of the United States Reparations Commission. 22 years of his mining career was spent mining tin in Southeast Asia, especially in what is now known as Malaysia eventually becoming President of the Pacific Tin Corporation.

The son of noted western author Agnes Morley Cleaveland, after his retirement from mining, Norman wrote and edited three books. His first, written with George Fitzpatrick, was titled The Morleys - young upstarts on the Southwest Frontier and chronicled Norman's maternal grandparents move to Northern New Mexico to participate in the management of the Maxwell Land Grant. Norman raised eyebrows with his assertion that his grandfather's death was not accidental but due to lingering animosity with a group known as the Santa Fe Ring over the land grab that occurred of the original land grant. 'Bang Bang in Ampang' published in 1973 concerned Norman's time in Southeast Asia during the communist uprising known as the Malaya Emergency. Norman did not support the early British colonial approach to appeasing developing communist factions in Malaya in the late 1940s. Norman caused considerable consternation, including with the young Kennedy senators and Lyndon B. Johnson, when he re-armed local constabularies in order to protect themselves and his mining operations. Norman's last literary effort was editing a book on the eccentric western faith healer Francis Schlatter, who was reported to have died in 1896. Titled The Healer: The Story of Francis Schlatter (Santa Fe, NM: Sunstone Press, 1989), it includes the text of The Life of the Harp in the Hand of the Harper, published by Norman's grandmother, Ada Morley, in 1897, detailing the healer's life and her conversations with him, as well as recollections of the event by his mother, Agnes.

Norman died at his home on June 8, 1997, in Santa Fe, New Mexico, at the age of 96. He played rugby most of his life and was a life member of the Santa Fe Rugby Club.
