= Colby Slater =

US international rugby union player

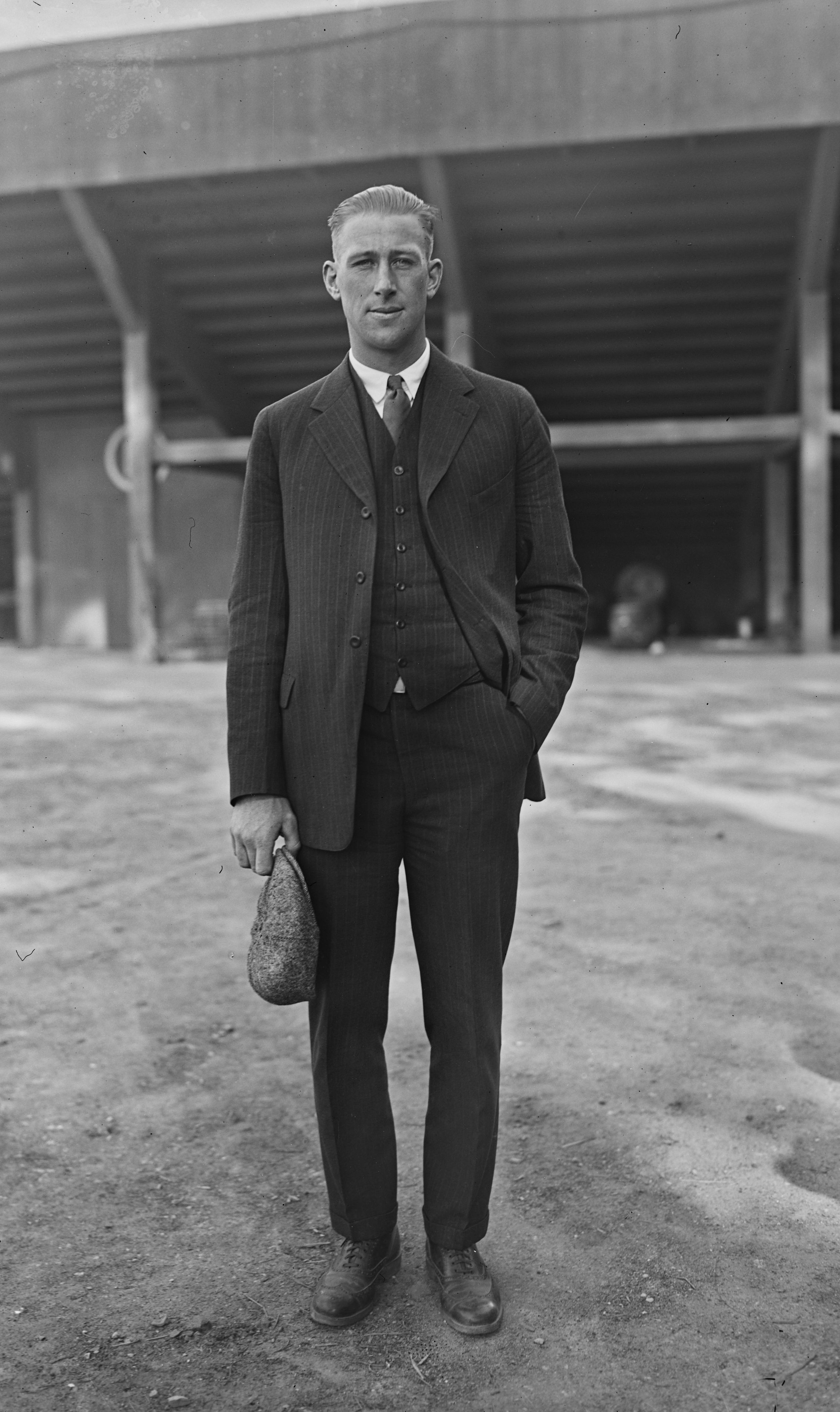
- Slater in 1924
- Full name: Colby Edmund Slater
- Born: April 30, 1896 Berkeley, California
- Died: January 30, 1965 (aged 68) Clarksburg, California
- University: UC Davis

Rugby union career
- Position: Second row
International career
Years	Team	Apps	(Points)
1920–1924	United States	2	(0)
- Correct as of December 19, 2018

Colby Slater
Medal record

Men's rugby union

Representing the United States

Olympic Games
Gold medal – first place	1920 Antwerp	Team competition
Gold medal – first place	1924 Paris	Team competition

Colby Edmund "Babe" Slater (April 30, 1896 – January 30, 1965) was an American rugby union player who captained the United States national rugby union team that won the gold medal at the 1924 Summer Olympics. He was a member of the American rugby union team, which won the gold medal in 1920 and 1924.

== Biography ==
Colby Slater was born on April 30, 1896, in Berkeley, California, the son and youngest of four children of John Slater and Louise Slater (born Chenery). With his older brother, Norman, Slater attended Berkeley High School and played for the school's rugby team in 1912 and 1913, winning a state championship in 1912. In 1914, Slater enrolled at the University Farm School in Davis, California. (The University Farm School was then a branch of the College of Agriculture at the University of California, Berkeley and is considered a precursor to the University of California, Davis, which claims him as an alumnus.) Slater graduated from the University Farm School in May 1917, and enlisted in the United States Army shortly thereafter. He served with the Medical Corps in France during World War I. In 1919, Slater returned to California and began his career as a farmer. In 2011, Slater was inducted twice into the U.S. Rugby Hall of Fame, as a member of both the 1920 and 1924 national teams. In 2012, Slater was again inducted into the U.S. Rugby Hall of Fame, but this time as an individual player.
