= Edward Turkington =

American rugby union player

Medal record

Men's rugby union

Representing the United States

Olympic Games
Gold medal – first place	1924 Paris	Team competition

Edward Lawrence Turkington (January 10, 1899 – September 3, 1996) was an American rugby union player who competed in the 1924 Summer Olympics. He was a member of the American rugby union team, which won the gold medal.
