= Robert Devereux (rugby union) =

American rugby union player

Olympic medal record

Men's rugby union

Representing the United States
Gold medal – first place	1924 Paris	Team competition

Robert H. Coleman Devereux (August 24, 1897 – April 28, 1974) was an American rugby union player who competed in the 1924 Summer Olympics. He was a member of the American rugby union team that won the gold medal.
