= André Chilo =

French sportsman

Olympic medal record

Men's Rugby union
Silver medal – second place	1920 Antwerp	Team

André Chilo (5 July 1898 – 3 November 1982) was a French rugby union player and athlete who competed in the 1920 Summer Olympics. He was born in Bordeaux and died in Barcus.

In 1920, he won the silver medal as a member of the French rugby team. He also participated in the triple jump competition, finishing 18th.
