= Charles Doe =

US international rugby union player

Charlie Doe
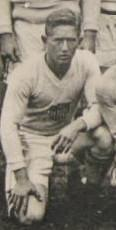
- Doe in 1920
- Full name: Charles Webster Doe Jr.
- Born: September 4, 1898 San Francisco, California
- Died: November 19, 1995 (aged 97) Contra Costa County, California

Rugby union career
International career
Years	Team	Apps	(Points)
1920–1924	United States	4	(15)
- Correct as of July 25, 2018
Medal record
Men's rugby union
Representing the United States
Olympic Games
Gold medal – first place	1920 Antwerp	Team competition
Gold medal – first place	1924 Paris	Team competition

Charles Webster "Charlie" Doe Jr. (September 4, 1898 – November 19, 1995) was an American rugby union player who competed in the 1920 Summer Olympics and 1924 Summer Olympics as a member of the United States national rugby union team. Doe was born in San Francisco, California, and died in Contra Costa County, California. He made four total appearances for the United States national rugby union team, winning gold medals at each of the 1920 and 1924 Olympics.
