= Caesar Mannelli =

American rugby union player

- Born: July 8, 1897 Forni di Sopra, Udine, Italy
- Died: May 3, 1936 (aged 38) Antioch, California, U.S.
- University: Santa Clara University

Rugby union career
International career
Years	Team	Apps	(Points)
1924	United States		
Medal record
Men's rugby union
Representing the United States
Olympic Games
Gold medal – first place	1924 Paris	Team competition

Caesar J. Mannelli (July 8, 1897 – May 3, 1936) was an American rugby union player who competed in the 1924 Summer Olympics. He was a member of the American rugby union team, which won the gold medal.

He attended Santa Clara University.
