= Emmanuel Iguiniz =

France international rugby union player

Emmanuel François Iguiniz
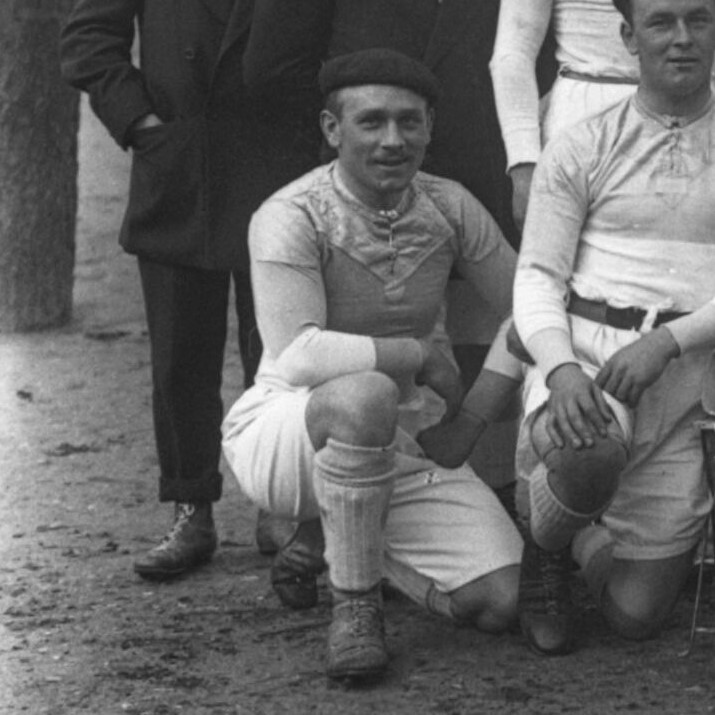
- Born: 9 December 1889 Bayonne, France
- Died: 20 September 1914 (aged 24) Craonne, France

Rugby union career
International career
Years	Team	Apps	(Points)
1914	France	1	

Emmanuel François Iguiniz (9 December 1889 – 20 September 1914) was a rugby union player, who represented France in one match. He was killed in action in the First World War.

His only appearance for France was on 13 April 1914 against England at Colombes, Paris, France. The English, led by Ronnie Palmer won the game 13–39, Palmer contributing four tries. It was the last international game of rugby played in Europe before the start of the First World War.
