= John O'Neil (rugby union) =

American rugby union player

Medal record

Men's rugby union

Representing the United States

Olympic Games
Gold medal – first place	1920 Antwerp	Team competition
Gold medal – first place	1924 Paris	Team competition

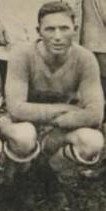
John O'Neil (rugby union)

John Thomas O'Neil (October 4, 1898 – March 25, 1950) was an American rugby union player who competed in the 1920 Summer Olympics and 1924 Summer Olympics.

He was a member of the American rugby union team, which won the gold medal at both Olympics.

He attended Santa Clara University.
