= Joseph Hunter (rugby union) =

American rugby union player

Medal record

Men's rugby union

Representing the United States

Olympic Games
Gold medal – first place	1920 Antwerp	Team competition

Joseph Garvin Hunter (October 4, 1899 – September 10, 1984) was an American rugby union player who competed in the 1920 Summer Olympics. He was a member of the American rugby union team, which won the gold medal. He attended Santa Clara University.
