= Henri Galau =

French rugby union player

Olympic medal record

Men's Rugby union
Silver medal – second place	1924 Paris	Team

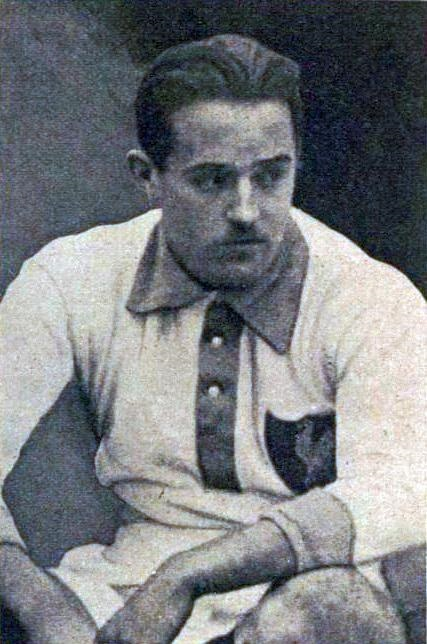
Henri Galau en janvier 1924

Henri Galau (18 July 1897 – 1 February 1950) was a French rugby union player who competed in the 1924 Summer Olympics. In 1924 he won the silver medal as member of the French team.
