= Raoul Got =

France international rugby union player

Olympic medal record

Men's Rugby union
Silver medal – second place	1924 Paris	Team

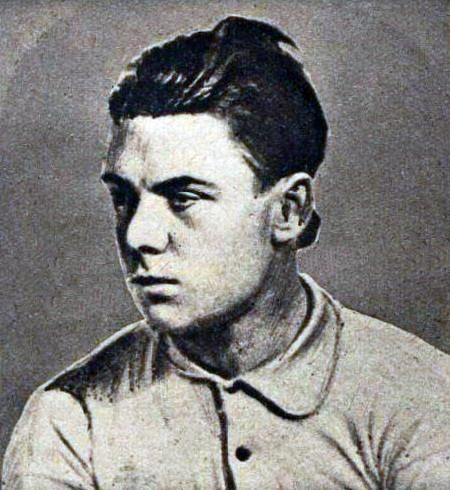
Raoul Got in 1920

Raoul Got (French: [ʁaul ɡo]; 11 October 1900 – 20 November 1955) was a French rugby union player who competed in the 1924 Summer Olympics. He was born, and died, in Perpignan. In 1924 he won the silver medal as member of the French team.
