= Rudolph Scholz =

American rugby union player

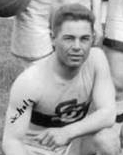
- Full name: Rudolph John Scholz
- Born: June 17, 1896 Kewanee, Illinois
- Died: December 9, 1981 (aged 85) Santa Clara County, California
- Height: 5 ft 6 in (1.68 m)

Rugby union career
- Position(s): Scrum-half, Flyhalf
Amateur team(s)
Years	Team	Apps	(Points)
- Olympic Club RFC
International career
Years	Team	Apps	(Points)
1920-1924	USA	4	(0)
Medal record
Men's rugby union
Representing the United States
Olympic Games
Gold medal – first place	1920 Antwerp	Team competition
Gold medal – first place	1924 Paris	Team competition

Rudolph John Scholz (June 17, 1896 – December 9, 1981) was an American rugby union player who competed in the 1920 Summer Olympics and 1924 Summer Olympics.

Scholz was born in Kewanee, Illinois to Rudolph John Scholz and Catherine Scholz (née Bayer). He attended Santa Clara University, graduating in 1918 and receiving an LL.D. in 1920. He was a member of the American rugby union team, which won the gold medal at both those Olympics.
