= André Béhotéguy =

French rugby union player

Olympic medal record

Men's Rugby union
| Silver medal – second place | 1924 Paris | Team |

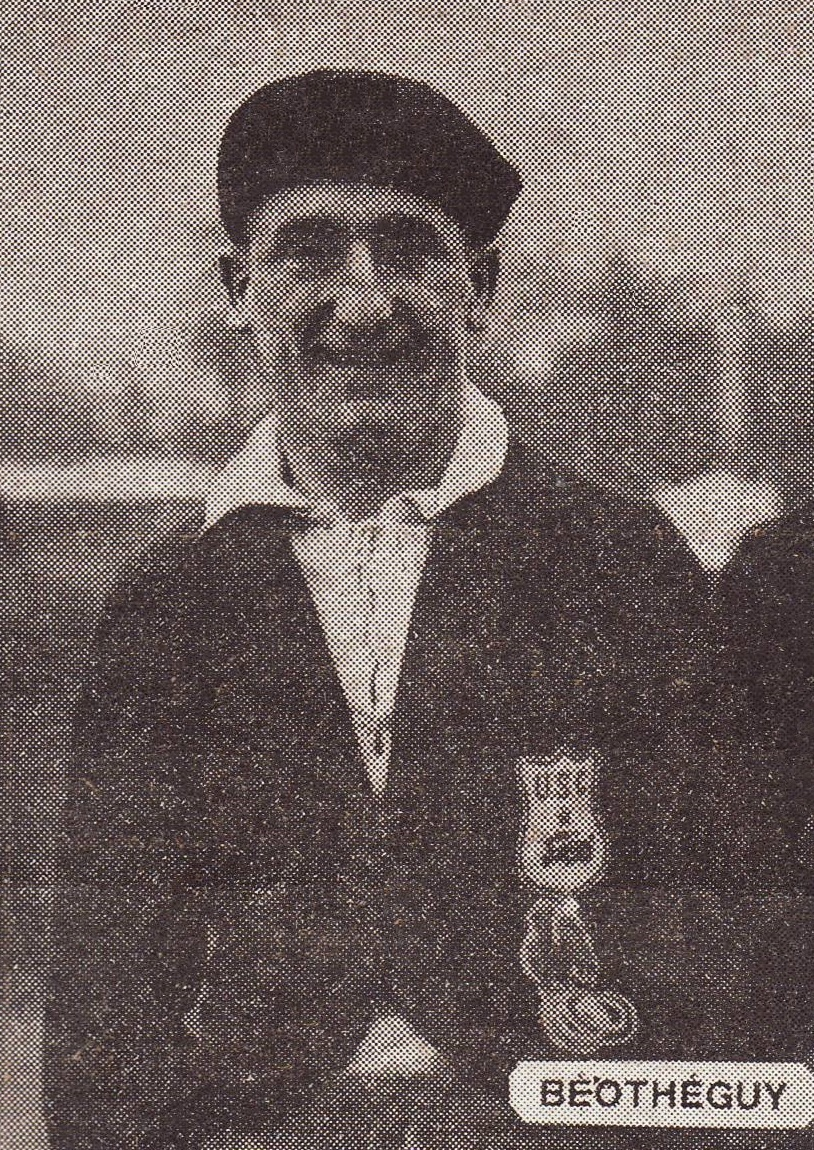

André Béhotéguy (19 October 1900 – 17 August 1960) was a French rugby union player who competed in the 1924 Summer Olympics. He was born in Bayonne and died in Nice. In 1924 he won the silver medal as member of the French team.
