= Alexandre Bioussa =

French rugby union player

Olympic medal record

Men's Rugby union
| Silver medal – second place | 1924 Paris | Team |

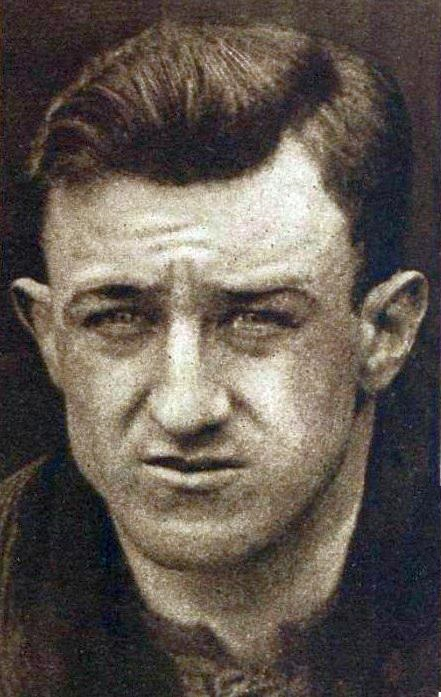
Alex Bioussa en mai 1927

Alexandre "Alex" Bioussa (17 March 1901 – 14 September 1966) was a French rugby union player who competed in the 1924 Summer Olympics. He was born and died in Toulouse. In 1924 he won the silver medal as member of the French team.
