= Adolphe Jauréguy =

French rugby union player

Olympic medal record

Men's Rugby union
| Silver medal – second place | 1924 Paris | Team |

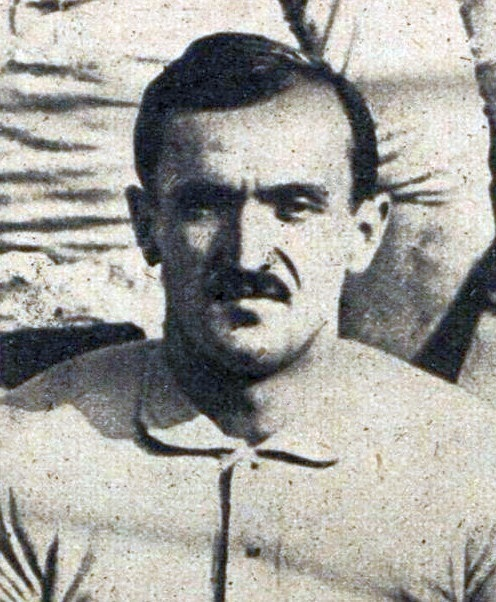
Adolphe Jauréguy en 1920

Adolphe Jauréguy (18 February 1898 – 4 September 1977) was a French rugby union player who competed in the 1924 Summer Olympics. He was born in Ostabat-Asme and died in Toulouse. He played in nine Five Nations Championships: in 1920, 1922, 1923, 1924, 1925, 1926, 1927, 1928 and 1929. In 1924 he won the silver medal as member of the French team.

== Honors and Awards ==
- Knight of the Order of the Legion of Honour (1946)
- Officer of the Order of the Legion of Honour (1955)
