= Marcel-Frédéric Lubin-Lebrère =

France international rugby union player

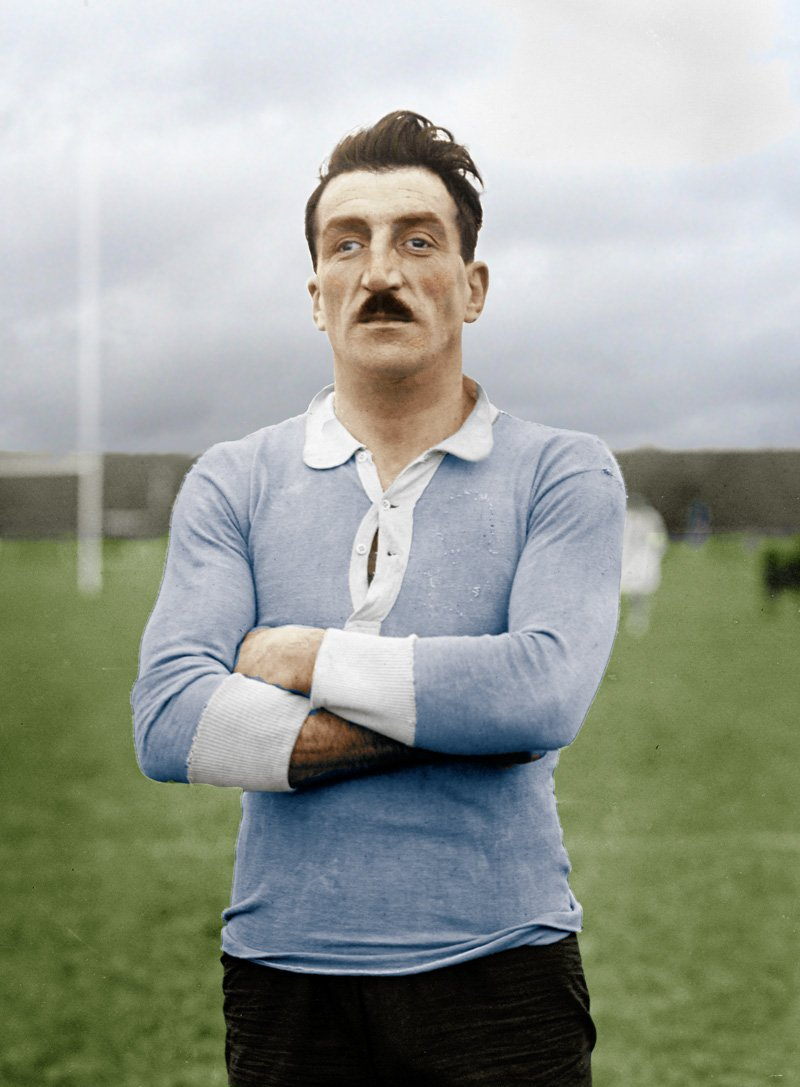
- Lubin-Lebrère at the Stade Yves-du-Manoir, 1922.
- Born: Marcel-Frédéric Lubin-Lebrère; 21 July 1891 Agen, Lot-et-Garonne, France
- Died: 7 July 1972 (aged 80) Toulouse, Haute-Garonne, France
- Height: 181 cm (5 ft 11 in)
- Weight: 92 kg (203 lb)

Rugby union career
- Position(s): Prop, Lock
Senior career
Years	Team	Apps	(Points)
–1913	US Montalbanaise		
1913–1925	Toulouse		
International career
Years	Team	Apps	(Points)
1914–1925	France	15	(6)
Coaching career
- Years: Team
- 1927–1928: Toulouse
Medal record
Men's rugby union
Silver medal – second place	1924 Paris	Team

Marcel-Frédéric Lubin-Lebrère (21 July 1891 – 7 July 1972) was a French rugby union player who competed in the 1924 Summer Olympics. Typically playing as a prop forward, Lubin-Lebrère was also occasional deployed as a lock.

Lubin-Lebrère played fifteen matches for France, including the 1920 Five Nations match against Scotland colloquially called the “Le match des borgnes”.

Lubin-Lebrère was arrested the night before the 1920 Ireland–France Five Nations fixture in Dublin, along with his teammates Théophile Cambre and Jean Sébédio, for singing revolutionary songs in a pub with sympathisers of the IRA at a time of the Irish War of Independence. They were released before the match. France won 7–15.
