= François Borde =

France international rugby union player

Olympic medal record

Men's Rugby union
Silver medal – second place	1920 Antwerp	Team

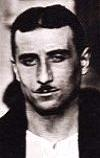
François Borde in 1922

François Borde (8 December 1899 – 15 December 1987) was a French rugby union player who competed in the 1920 Summer Olympics. He was born in Lourdes and died in Bayonne. In 1920, he won the silver medal as a member of the French team.
