= Rugby union at the Summer Olympics =

- IOC Code: RUG
- Governing body: World Rugby
- Events: 2 (men: 1; women: 1)

Summer Olympics
- 1896; 1900; 1904; 1908; 1912; 1920; 1924; 1928; 1932; 1936; 1948; 1952; 1956; 1960; 1964; 1968; 1972; 1976; 1980; 1984; 1988; 1992; 1996; 2000; 2004; 2008; 2012; 2016; 2020; 2024; 2028; 2032
- Medalists

Rugby union has been a men's medal sport at the modern Summer Olympic Games, being played at four of the first seven competitions. The sport debuted at the 1900 Paris games where the gold medal was won by the host nation. It was subsequently featured at the London games in 1908, the Antwerp games in 1920 and the Paris games in 1924.

Shortly after the 1924 games, the International Olympic Committee (IOC) dropped rugby union as an Olympic sport. Since then there have been numerous attempts to bring the sport back to the Olympic programme. In October 2009 the IOC voted at its session in Copenhagen to include the sevens version of the sport in the 2016 Summer Olympics in Rio de Janeiro. The event made its debut in an Olympic programme at the 2014 Summer Youth Olympics.

== Inclusion ==
The sport was introduced by Pierre de Coubertin, who is famous for reviving the modern Olympics. He also helped to establish rugby in France, refereeing the first domestic French club championship in 1892 and France's first international, on New Year's Day, 1906, at Parc des Princes. Coubertin formed the IOC in 1894, but rugby union was not featured until the II Olympiad.

=== 1900 ===
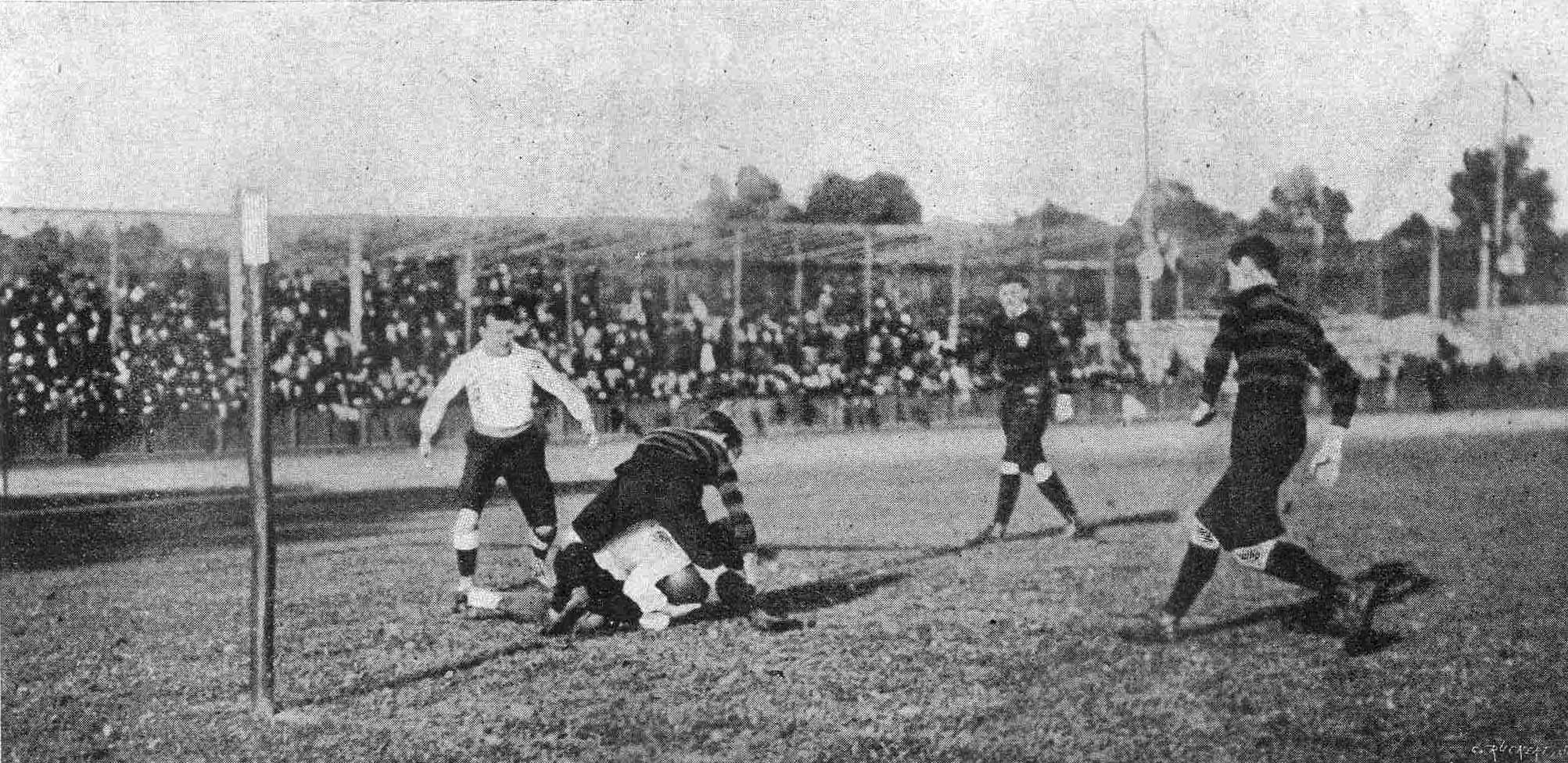
Scene of the rugby game between France and Germany at the 1900 Summer Olympics

Three National Olympic Committees (NOCs), France, Germany and Great Britain, entered teams at the 1900 games.

The teams were not national teams in the current sense of the word: the Union des Sociétés Françaises de Sports Athlétiques represented France, the Moseley Wanderers RFC represented Great Britain, and the FC 1880 Frankfurt represented Germany. Rules were also different from today's: while points for penalties and conversions were worth three and two points respectively, the same as in the modern game, three points were awarded for tries (as opposed to the modern five), while four points were given for a drop goal (as opposed to the modern three).

Also, four points were awarded for a goal from mark; this would be reduced to three points in 1905, and was deleted from the rules in 1977.

France won the gold, beating Great Britain by 27 points to 8 and defeating Germany by 27 points to 17. Some sources list the German team as second on the points difference, but no such determination was made in 1900. 6,000 people watched the game between France and Great Britain, which was the largest crowd at the Games.

Two players on the French team were not of French nationality: Constantin Henriquez was from Haiti and André Roosevelt was an American, therefore, later IOC attributed the French medal to the Mixed team. Constantin Henriquez, a player on the French team, is the first known coloured athlete to compete in the Olympic Games.

=== 1908 ===
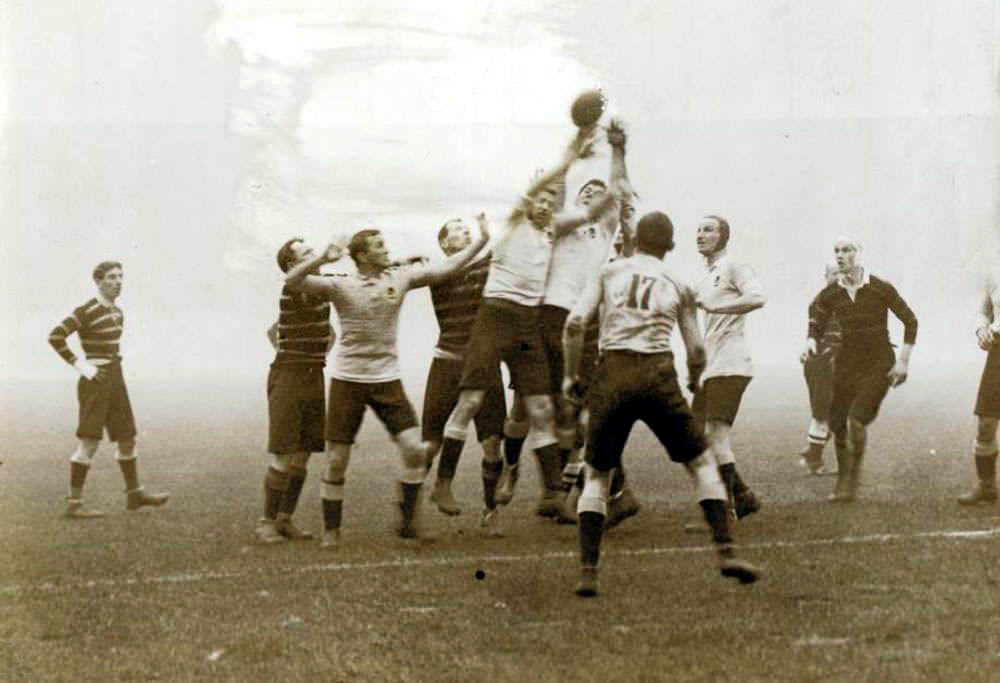
1908 Olympic Gold Final Wallabies v Cornwall

Rugby union was not played at the 1904 games in St. Louis, nor at the 1906 Intercalated Games, but was included in 1908, when the Olympics were held in the sport's native country.

The Rugby Football Union (RFU) was involved in the organization of the sport at this edition of the Olympics. Like the 1900 Games, three teams entered: Australasia (representing Australia and New Zealand), France, and hosts Great Britain (which included the whole of the United Kingdom of Great Britain and Ireland), but France pulled out prior to the commencement of the tournament, due to being unable to field a representative team.

Australasia was represented by the 1908-09 Australian 'Wallabies', who were already in Britain on a tour. As the best English and Welsh players were at the time returning from a tour in New Zealand and Australia, Great Britain was represented by the Cornwall county team, who were chosen by the RFU as an appropriate side after they defeated Durham to win the 1907 English County Championship. The choice of Cornwall was controversial, as only three of their players had ever represented England and the Wallabies had recently defeated them 18 points to five.

As expected, Australasia defeated Great Britain, claiming the gold medal, the score being 32 points to three. The match at the White City Stadium was played under poor conditions, in fog and on a slippery field. Two of the Australian team members would later win another Olympic gold medal: Danny Carroll would win another rugby gold with the United States in 1920, while Sydney Middleton would win a gold medal in rowing at the 1912 Games, where rugby was not on the programme. The sport also failed to appear on the provisional schedule of the 1916 Summer Olympics, which were cancelled due to World War I.

=== 1920 ===
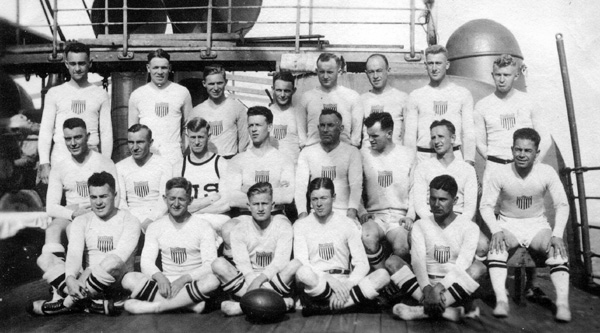
1920 USA Rugby Team

A campaign to send an American side to the 1920 games in Antwerp started in California after a Berkeley rugby union touring party returned from British Columbia undefeated in 1920. The United States Olympic Committee (USOC) granted permission for their entry. A pool of players from Stanford, Berkeley, and Santa Clara made up the squad. 1908 champion Danny Carroll, a player-coach at Stanford at the time, was the team's most prominent member.

By the time the U.S. arrived in Antwerp, the Czech and Romanian teams had withdrawn, while the English RFU had declined an invitation to enter a team, to avoid interfering with the start of the English domestic season. This left France and the United States as the only teams.

Their match was played in rain in front of around 20,000 spectators, with the U.S., featuring many players new to the sport of rugby, causing a shock by winning by eight points to nil, all points being scored in the second half.

One of the U.S. team members, Morris Kirksey, took home two more medals from Antwerp, finishing second to Charles Paddock in the 100 meters dash, and anchoring the winning 4 × 100 meters relay team.

=== 1924 ===
The sport was again included in the subsequent 1924 Games in Paris. The USOC decided to send a team, while the host nation and Romania entered. The American team was again made up of mainly Californian players. The U.S. squad departed on a seven-day voyage to England on an ocean liner from New York City.

France defeated Romania 59-3 and entered the final game as favorites.

The gold medal game was played on 18 May in front of 30,000 spectators at the Colombes venue. During the final, French fans booed and hissed the American team throughout. French fans also threw bottles and rocks onto the field and at American players and officials, wild brawls broke out in the stands, and U.S. spectator Gideon Nelson was knocked unconscious after being hit in the face by a walking stick.

The Americans won the gold medal by 17-3. At the final whistle, French fans invaded the pitch, forcing police, and French players and officials, to protect the Americans. At the medal ceremony, The Star-Spangled Banner was drowned out by the booing and hissing of French fans, and the American team had to be escorted to their locker room under police protection.

Rare vintage footage of the 1924 Gold Medal match was included in the rugby documentary, A Giant Awakens: the Rise of American Rugby.

== Exclusion ==
The crowd violence during, and the pitch invasion after, the 1924 Olympic Final served to give rugby a poor image. This, combined with the problems of attracting sufficient teams to make it a viable competition, the desire to include more individual and women's events, and the departure of a major advocate when Baron Pierre De Coubertin stepped down as head of the Olympic Movement in 1925, marked the downfall of rugby at the Olympics. In 1928, the IOC turned down a request to stage rugby at the Amsterdam Games.

An exhibition tournament was held at the 1936 Berlin Games, with France, Germany, Italy and Romania competing. In what is the last rugby union match played at the Olympics as of 2021, France beat Germany in the final 19 to 14.

In 1976, 22 African countries and Guyana demanded that New Zealand be banned from the Olympics in Montreal due to a New Zealand rugby team touring South Africa, which had been banned from the Olympics since 1964 because of its apartheid politics.

As rugby union was no longer an Olympic sport, the IOC declined to ban New Zealand, and these 23 nations boycotted the 1976 Olympics.

== Efforts for re-inclusion ==
=== Fifteens ===
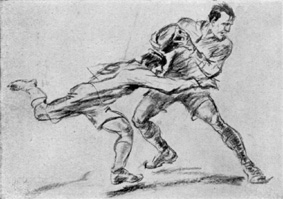
The drawing Rugby by Luxembourgeois painter Jean Jacoby, which earned him a gold in a 1928 Olympic art competition, after the sport had been dropped

Italy in 1960, the Soviet Union in 1980, and South Korea in 1988 made requests to have rugby union brought back. The 1980 request did not pass, and the 1988 games came close but failed to see the sport's admission, which was backed by the International Rugby Football Board (now, World Rugby (WR)).

Apart from supporting the individual host cities' requests, the IRB did not focus its own efforts on returning the sport to the Olympics until the early 1990s, when efforts began to reunite the two movements with a series of informal meetings between the then IRB Secretary, Keith Rowlands, and the British Olympic Association Secretary, Dick Palmer. In 1994, when Vernon Pugh QC of Wales was elected Chairman of the IRB, the march towards Olympic recognition began in earnest. Pugh convinced the IRB Council that Olympic membership – initially as a non-participation sport – would be beneficial to rugby and offer the IRB member unions membership of their National Olympic Committees. Many European Federations, such as France, Italy and Romania, had been members of their National Olympic Committees for decades. The demand to get rugby back in the Olympics mounted as more rugby nations from Africa, Asia, Oceania and the Americas joined the IRB, because it was a sport seen as providing a realistic medal opportunity for a number of smaller nations.

A significant step in the process of acceptance back into the Olympic Movement was achieved at a ceremony held in Cardiff in November 1994, when the IRB was officially confirmed as a Recognised International Federation of the IOC. At that ceremony, International Olympic Committee President, Juan Antonio Samaranch, pointed out that rugby's history and values were very much in tune with the Olympic philosophy and traditions. This historic meeting in Cardiff led to IRB representation at annual IOC meetings and consideration for inclusion in the programme of future Olympic Games. In 2002, a plan was presented to induct rugby sevens, golf and the Chinese martial art of wushu.

=== Sevens ===
For further information, see Rugby sevens at the Summer Olympics#Efforts to include rugby sevens in the Olympics

== Men ==
=== Results ===
Year	Host	Gold medal game			Bronze medal game		
Year	Host	Gold	Score	Silver	Bronze	Score	4th place
1900; Details	(France); Paris	France (Mixed team)		(North German Confederation); Germany (United Kingdom); Great Britain	three nations entered		
1908; Details	(United Kingdom); London	Australasia	32–3	(United Kingdom); Great Britain	two nations entered		
1920; Details	(Belgium); Antwerp	United States	8–0	France	two nations entered		
1924; Details	(France); Paris	United States	17–3	France	Romania		three nations entered

=== Participating nations ===
Nation	00	08	20	24	Years
Australasia	–	1st place, gold medalist(s)	–	–	
France	1st place, gold medalist(s)	–	2nd place, silver medalist(s)	2nd place, silver medalist(s)	
Germany	2nd place, silver medalist(s)	–	–	–	
Great Britain	2nd place, silver medalist(s)	2nd place, silver medalist(s)	–	–	
Romania	–	–	–	3rd place, bronze medalist(s)	
United States	–	–	1st place, gold medalist(s)	1st place, gold medalist(s)	
Mixed team	1st place, gold medalist(s)	–	–	–	
Total nations	3	2	2	3	

== Medal table ==
Accurate as of the conclusion of the 1924 Olympics.

Rank	Nation	Gold	Silver	Bronze	Total
1	United States	2	0	0	2
2	France	1	2	0	3
3	Australasia	1	0	0	1
3	Mixed team	1	0	0	1
5	Great Britain	0	2	0	2
6	Germany	0	1	0	1
7	Romania	0	0	1	1
Totals (7 entries)		5	5	1	11

Updated: 1924 Summer Olympics

== Notable rugby players involved in the Olympics ==
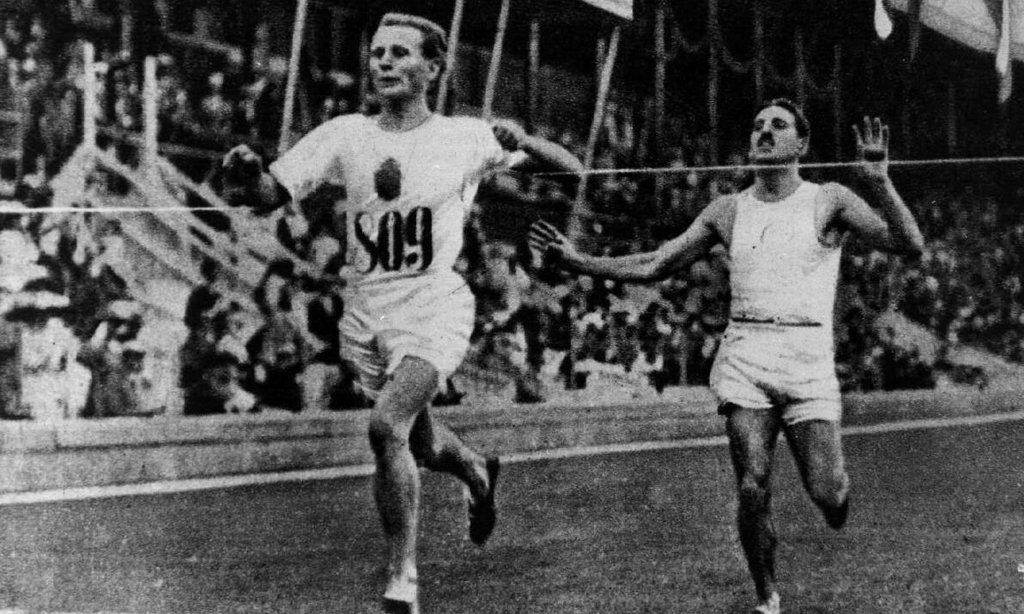
French rugby player Jean Bouin (right) at the 1912 Stockholm Olympics

A number in other fields have also been notable rugby players, these include:

- Pierre de Coubertin, founder of the modern Olympics, was a rugby fan and referee of the first ever French championship rugby union final on 20 March 1892 between Racing Club de France and Stade Français Paris.
- Jean Bouin, France and track events.
- Stan Harris
- Eric Liddell, Scotland and track events.
- Chris MacKintosh
- Heather Moyse, Canada and gold in Olympic bobsleigh.
- James Cecil Parke, Ireland and track events (also represented Ireland in cricket and golf, and as well as competing at Wimbledon and in the Davis Cup)
- Noel Purcell, Ireland and gold in Olympic water polo – the first Olympic athlete to represent two countries, Great Britain and the Irish Free State.
- David Robertson (golfer)
- Jacques Rogge, Belgium international and former IOC president.
- Constantin Henriquez, Haitian rugby player who won gold for France.
- Attie van Heerden
- Danny Crates, who has carried the torch twice at the Olympics, and is a notable Paralympian, also plays competitive rugby.
- Kevin O'Flanagan, Ireland international. Represented Ireland on the International Olympic Committee
- Victor Costello, who competed for Ireland in the shot put at the 1992 Games in Barcelona before winning 39 caps for the Ireland rugby union team.

== Venues ==
Games	City	Stadium	Capacity	Ref.
(France) 1900	Paris	Vélodrome de Vincennes	not listed	
(United Kingdom) 1908	London	White City Stadium	97,000	
(Belgium) 1920	Antwerp	Olympisch Stadion	12,771	
(France) 1924	Paris	Stade de Colombes	22,737	

== See also ==
- List of Olympic venues in discontinued events
- Rugby sevens at the Summer Olympics
