= 1899 in France =

- Decades: 1870s; 1880s; 1890s; 1900s; 1910s
- See also: History of France; Timeline of French history; List of years in France

Events from the year 1899 in France.

== Incumbents ==
- President: Félix Faure (until 18 February), Émile Loubet (starting 18 February)
- President of the Council of Ministers: Charles Dupuy (until 22 June), Pierre Waldeck-Rousseau (starting 22 June)

== Events ==
- 21 January – Actress Sarah Bernhardt, having taken over management of the Paris theatre which she renames the Théâtre Sarah-Bernhardt, opens in the title rôle of Victorien Sardou's La Tosca. On 20 May she premières a French adaptation of Shakespeare's Hamlet with herself in the title rôle, one of the first successful female actresses to tackle a male part.
- 18 February – Emile Loubet is elected president following the death of Felix Faure.
- 23 February – Paul Déroulède and Jules Guérin of the right-wing Ligue des Patriotes attempt to persuade General Georges-Gabriel de Pellieux to lead a coup d'état during the funeral of Félix Faure in order to overthrow President Loubet. General Pellieux refuses to participate. Later in the year, Déroulède and Guérin are indicted for conspiracy against the government and banished from France.
- 28 March – Alfred Martineau becomes the new French colonial governor of French Somaliland, the modern-day Republic of Djibouti.
- 16 April – Battle of Lougou, French victory in Niger.
- 4 June – Émile Loubet is assaulted at the Longchamp Racecourse while watching the annual Grand Steeplechase.
- 10 June – Composer Ernest Chausson dies when his bicycle crashes into a brick wall as he is riding down a hill. The death is ruled to be an accident, although later biographers speculate that Chausson committed suicide.
- 12 June – France's Prime Minister Charles Dupuy and his cabinet announce their resignations after losing a vote of confidence in the Chamber of Deputies.
- 20 June – Right-wing nationalist movement Action Française formed by Maurice Pujo and Henri Vaugeois.
- 22 June – Pierre Waldeck-Rousseau forms a new government to become Prime Minister of France.
- 17 July – The French Bretonnet-Braun mission is destroyed in the Battle of Togbao, in Chad, by the warlord Rabih az-Zubayr.
- 25 July – France's Minister of War levies out punishments against officers who participated in the Dreyfus affair, dismissing General Georges-Gabriel de Pellieux as Military Governor of Paris, and removing General Oscar de Négrier from the War Council.
- 14 August – Attorney Fernand Labori is wounded in an assassination attempt while serving as the defense lawyer for in the retrial of Captain Alfred Dreyfus.
- 24 August – Minister of Commerce, Alexandre Millerand, decrees a change in regulations to extend the right to workers' compensation to cover all profit-making establishments.
- 19 September – Alfred Dreyfus is pardoned.
- 28 October – Battle of Kouno, indecisive battle between French forces and a Muslim army led by Rabih az-Zubayr in Chad.
- Automobile manufacturer Renault established by Louis Renault and his brothers Marcel and Fernand.
- Henri Matisse paints Still Life with Compote, Apples and Oranges.
- Camille Pissarro takes an apartment overlooking the Tuileries Garden in Paris and produces a series of paintings of the view.

== Literature ==
- René Boylesve - Mademoiselle Cloque
- Octave Mirbeau - Le Jardin des supplices

== Music ==
- Claude Debussy - Chansons de Bilitis
- Gabriel Fauré - Nocturne No. 7
- Jules Massenet - Cendrillon
- Maurice Ravel - Pavane pour une infante défunte
- Camille Saint-Saëns
  - 6 Études, Op. 111
  - String Quartet No. 1, Op. 112

== Sport ==
- 31 August – The Olympique de Marseille association football club is founded.
- 21 September – Henri François Béconnais sets the 1 km speed record (48 seconds) in a Soncin automobile at Achères.

== Births ==
=== January to March ===
- 6 January – Alphonse Castex, rugby union player (died 1969)
- 7 January – Francis Poulenc, composer (died 1963)
- 12 January – Pierre Bernac, baritone (died 1979)
- 15 January – Louis Guilloux, writer (died 1980)
- 20 January – Pierre Gandon, illustrator and engraver of postage stamps (died 1990)
- 23 January – Pierre Grany, athlete (died 1968)
- 7 February – René Crabos, rugby union player (died 1964)
- 15 February – Georges Auric, composer (died 1983)
- 21 February – Yvonne Vallée, actress (died 1996)
- 25 February – Bernadette Cattanéo, trade unionist, communist activist, newspaper editor (died 1963)
- 9 March – Jules Dewaquez, soccer player (died 1971)
- 25 March – Jacques Audiberti, playwright, poet and novelist (died 1965)
- 28 March – Bernard Delaire, last French naval veteran of the First World War (died 2007)

=== April to June ===
- 7 April – Robert Casadesus, pianist (died 1972)
- 11 April – Clément Dupont, rugby union player (died 1993)
- 8 May – Jacques Heim, fashion designer (died 1967)
- 14 May
  - Pierre Victor Auger, physicist (died 1993)
  - Pierre Petiteau, rugby union player (died 1974)
- 15 May – Jean-Étienne Valluy, general (died 1970)
- 17 May – Anita Conti, explorer, photographer and first French female oceanographer (died 1997)
- 24 May – Suzanne Lenglen, tennis player (died 1938)
- 20 June – Jean Moulin, prefect and Resistance leader (died in custody 1943)

=== July to September ===
- 5 July
  - Marcel Achard, playwright, screenwriter and author (died 1974)
  - Marcel Arland, novelist, literary critic and journalist (died 1986)
- 7 July – Jean-Albert Grégoire, car pioneer (died 1992)
- 14 July – Marie-Hélène Cardot, French resistance leader and politician (died 1977)
- 19 July – Germaine Sablon, singer and actress (died 1985)
- 26 July – Édouard Bader, rugby union player (died 1983)
- 9 August – Armand Salacrou, dramatist (died 1989)
- 14 August – Adolphe Bousquet, rugby union player (died 1972)
- 28 August – Charles Boyer, actor (died 1978)
- 9 September – Brassaï, photographer, sculptor and filmmaker (died 1984)
- 14 September – Youenn Drezen, Breton nationalist writer and activist (died 1972)

=== October to December ===
- 1 October – Joseph Guillemot, athlete and Olympic gold medallist (died 1975)
- 5 October – Georges Bidault politician and resistance leader (died 1983)
- 8 October – Edmond Michelet, politician (died 1970)
- 24 October – Philippe Kieffer, Naval officer (died 1962)
- 30 October – Georges Capdeville, soccer referee (died 1991)
- 8 December
  - Fernand Arnout, weightlifter and Olympic medallist (died 1974)
  - François Borde, rugby union player (died 1987)
- 9 December – Jean de Brunhoff, writer and illustrator (died 1937)

=== Full date unknown ===
- Marcel Fétique, bowmaker (died 1977)
- Henri-Robert Petit, journalist, Collaborationist under the Vichy regime and far-right activist (died 1985)

== Deaths ==
- 16 February – Félix Faure, President of France (born 1841)
- 16 May – Francisque Sarcey, journalist and drama critic (born 1827)
- 10 June – Ernest Chausson, composer (born 1855)
- 5 July – Hippolyte Lucas, entomologist (born 1814)
- 11 July – Charles Joseph Marty-Laveaux, literary scholar (born 1823)
- 14 July – Jean-François Klobb, colonial officer (born 1857)
- 20 July – Charlotte de Rothschild, socialite and painter (born 1825)
- 25 September – Francisque Bouillier, philosopher (born 1813)
- 28 November – Virginia Oldoini, Mistress of Napoleon III and significant figure in the early history of photography. (born 1837)

=== Full date unknown ===
- Henri Delaborde, art critic and painter (born 1811)

== See also ==
- List of French films before 1910
