= List of University of California, Berkeley alumni in sports =

This page lists notable sports alumni and students of the University of California, Berkeley.

Sports alumni of the University of California, Berkeley

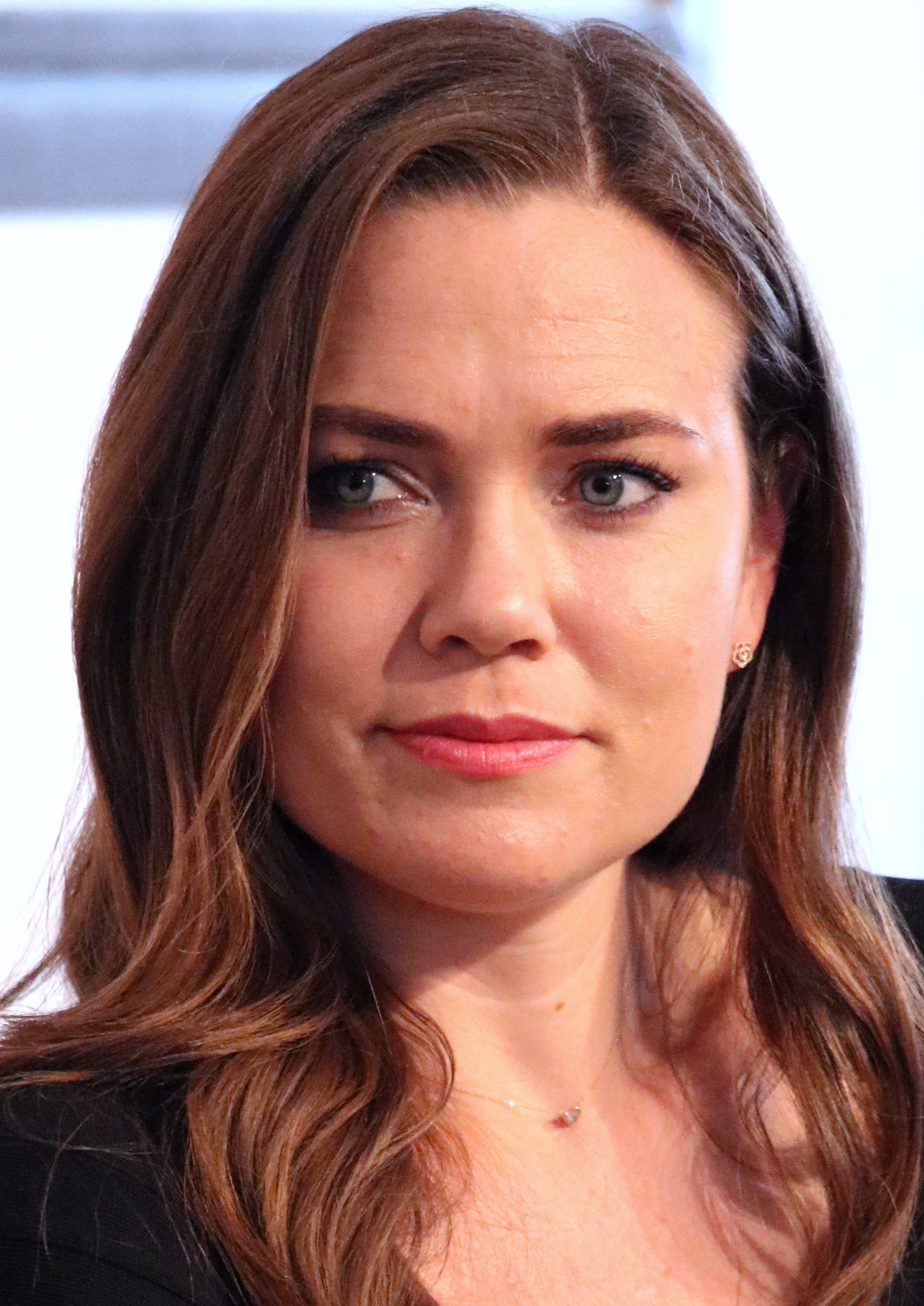
Natalie Coughlin, BA 2005 – Olympic gold medalist; the first American female athlete to win six medals in one Olympics

Jonny Moseley, BA 2007 – Olympic gold medalist

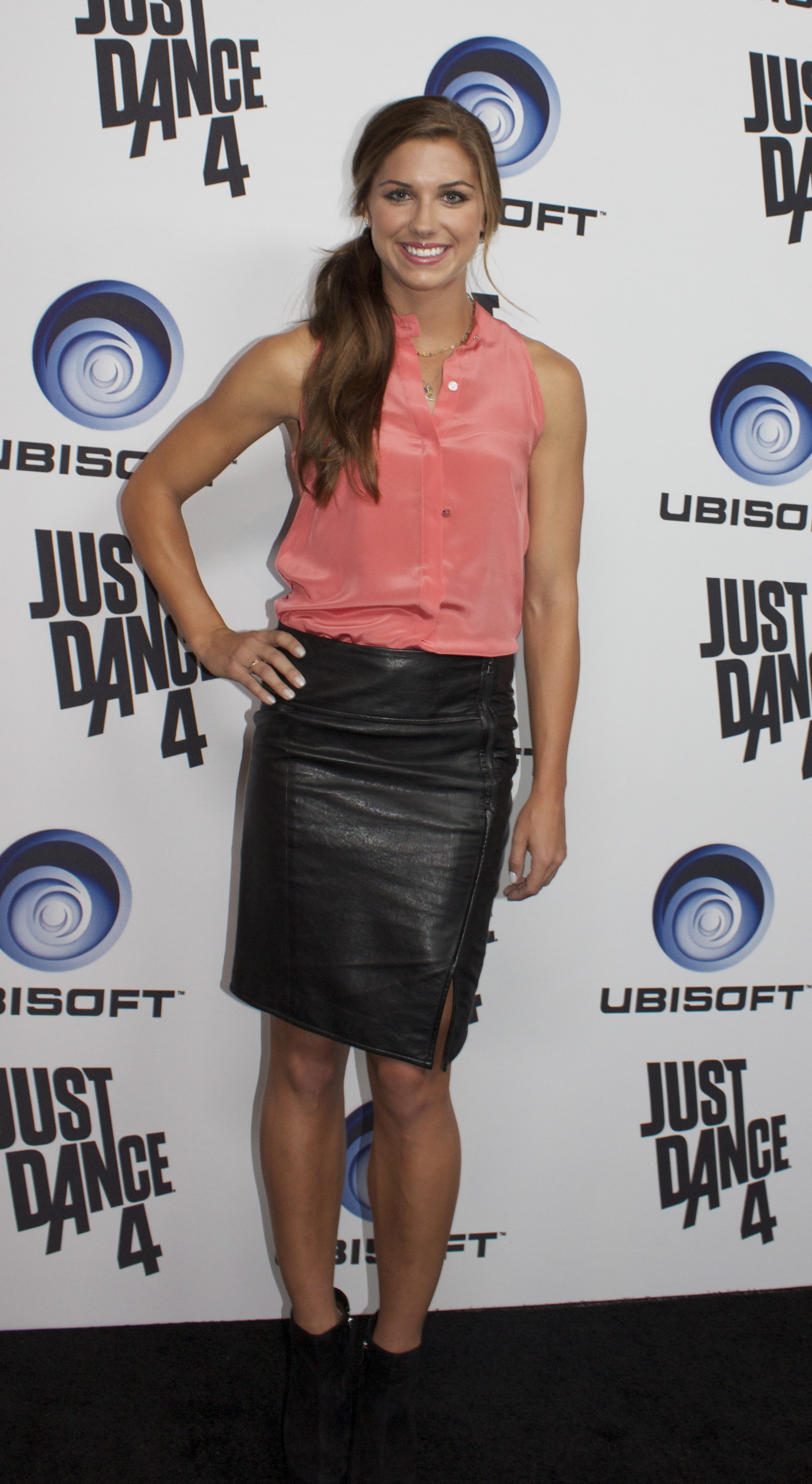
Alex Morgan, BA 2010 – Olympic gold medalist

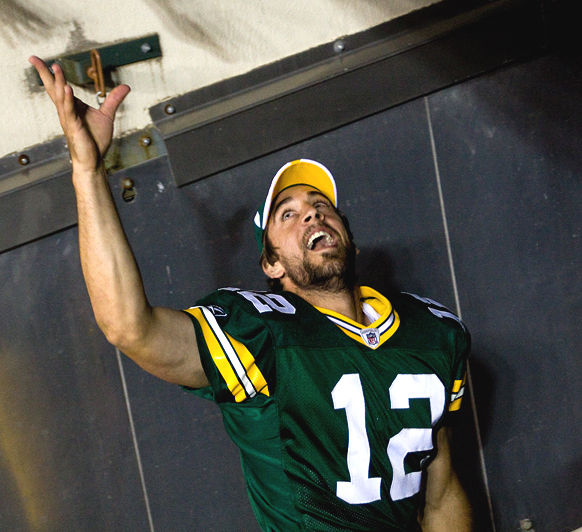
Aaron Rodgers – MVP of Super Bowl XLV

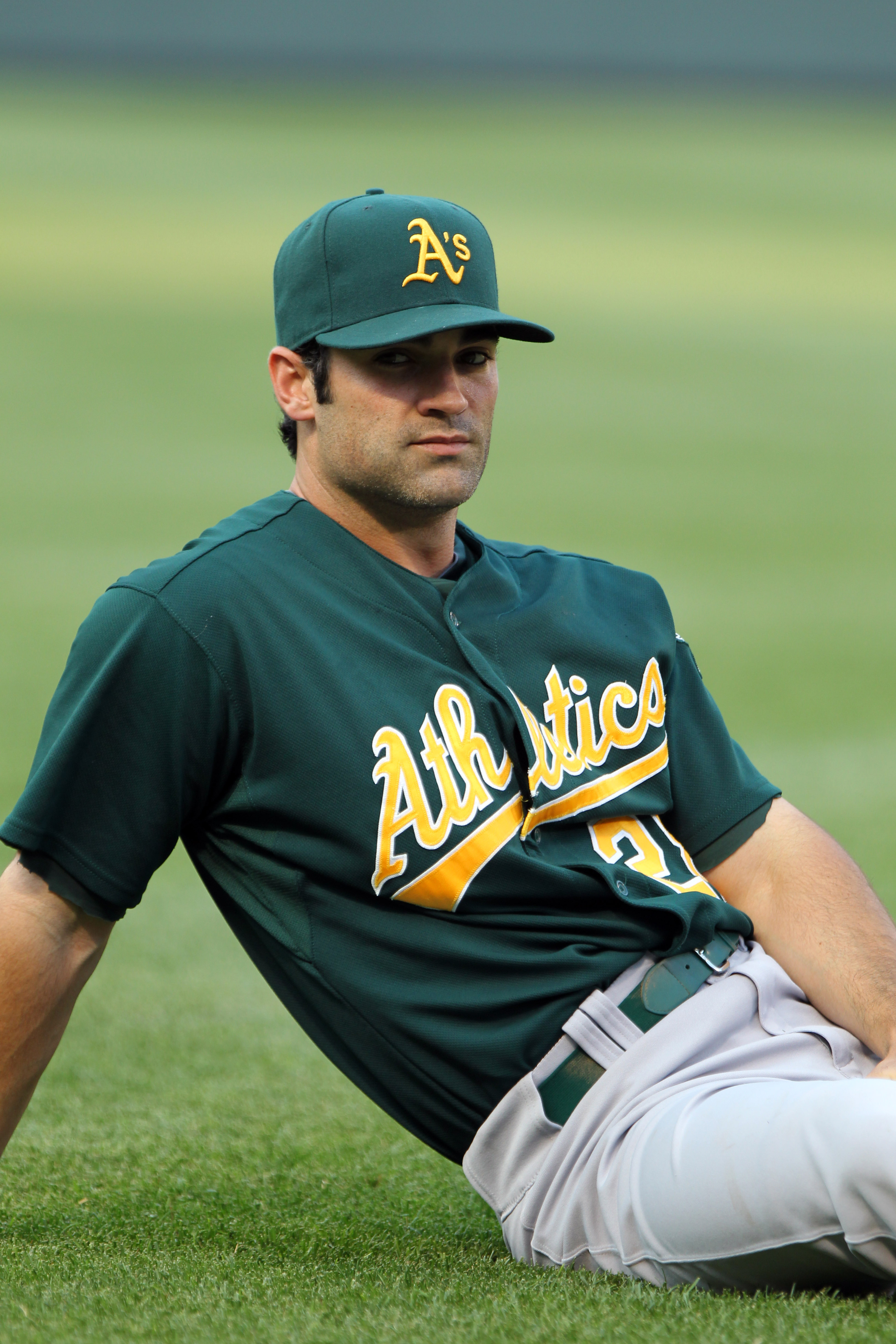
Conor Jackson

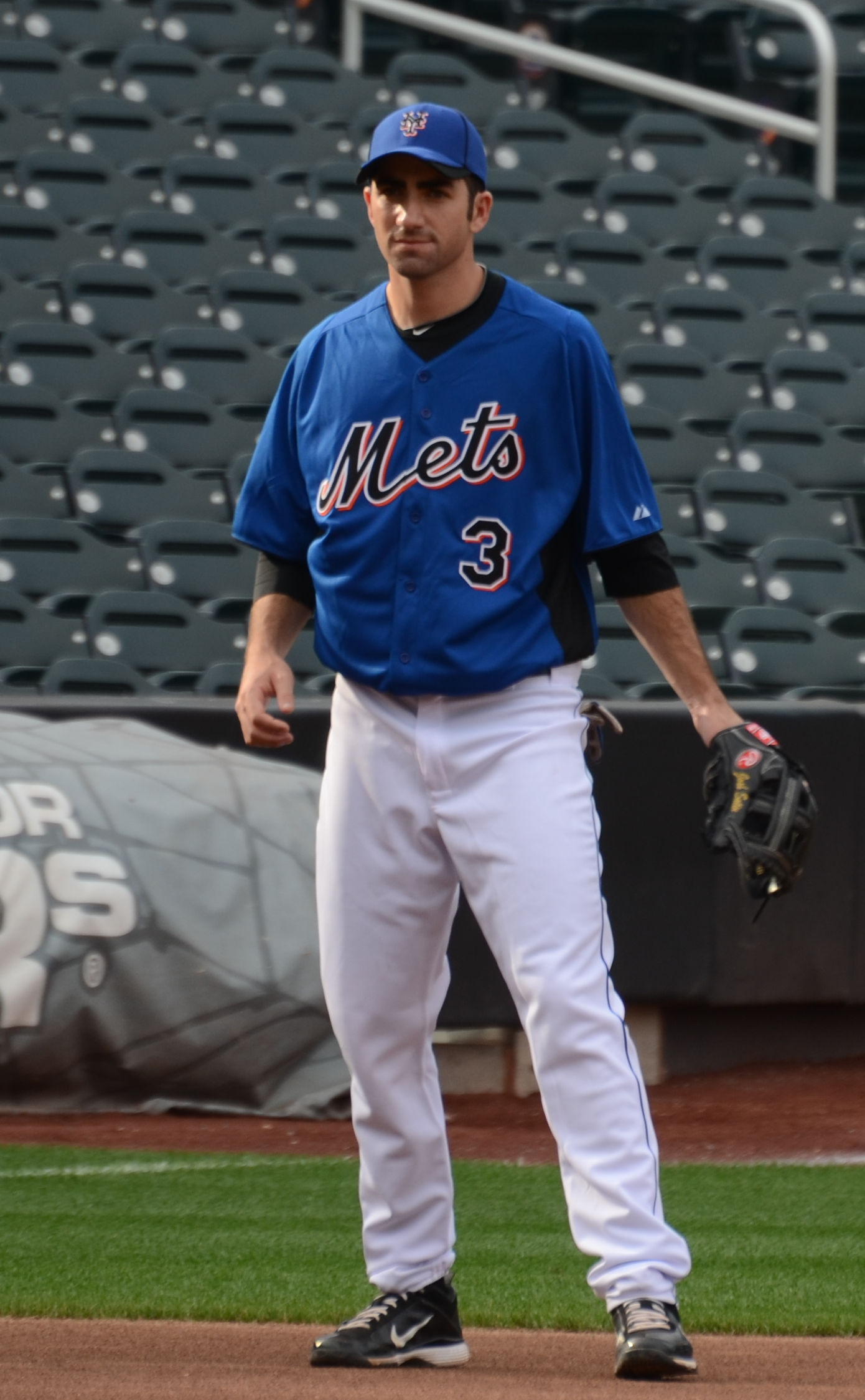
Josh Satin

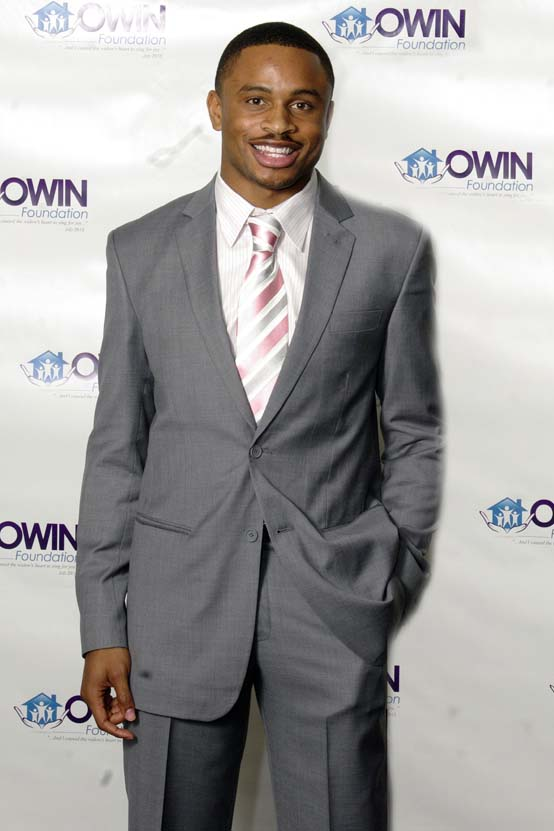
Nnamdi Asomugha

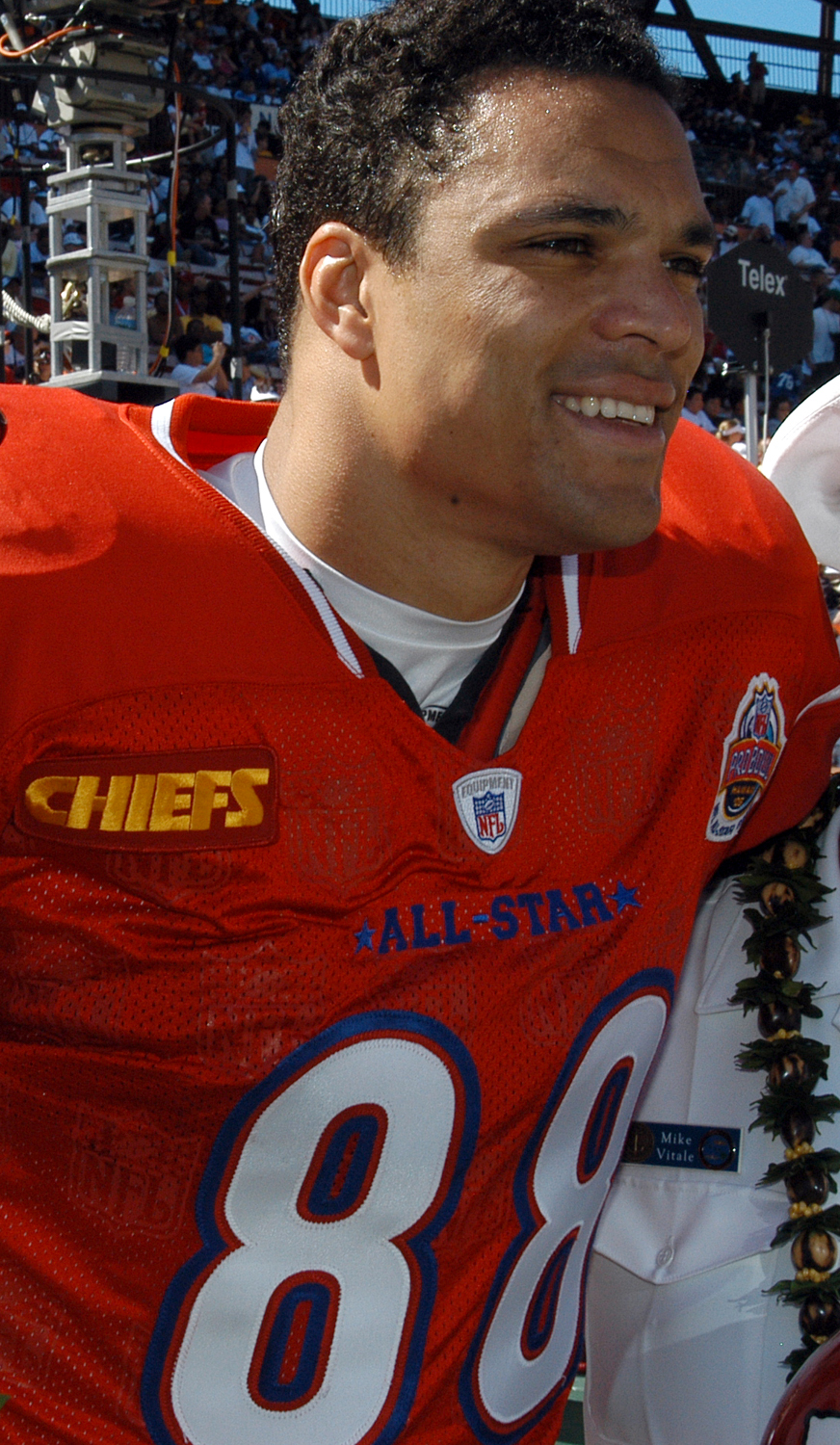
Tony Gonzalez

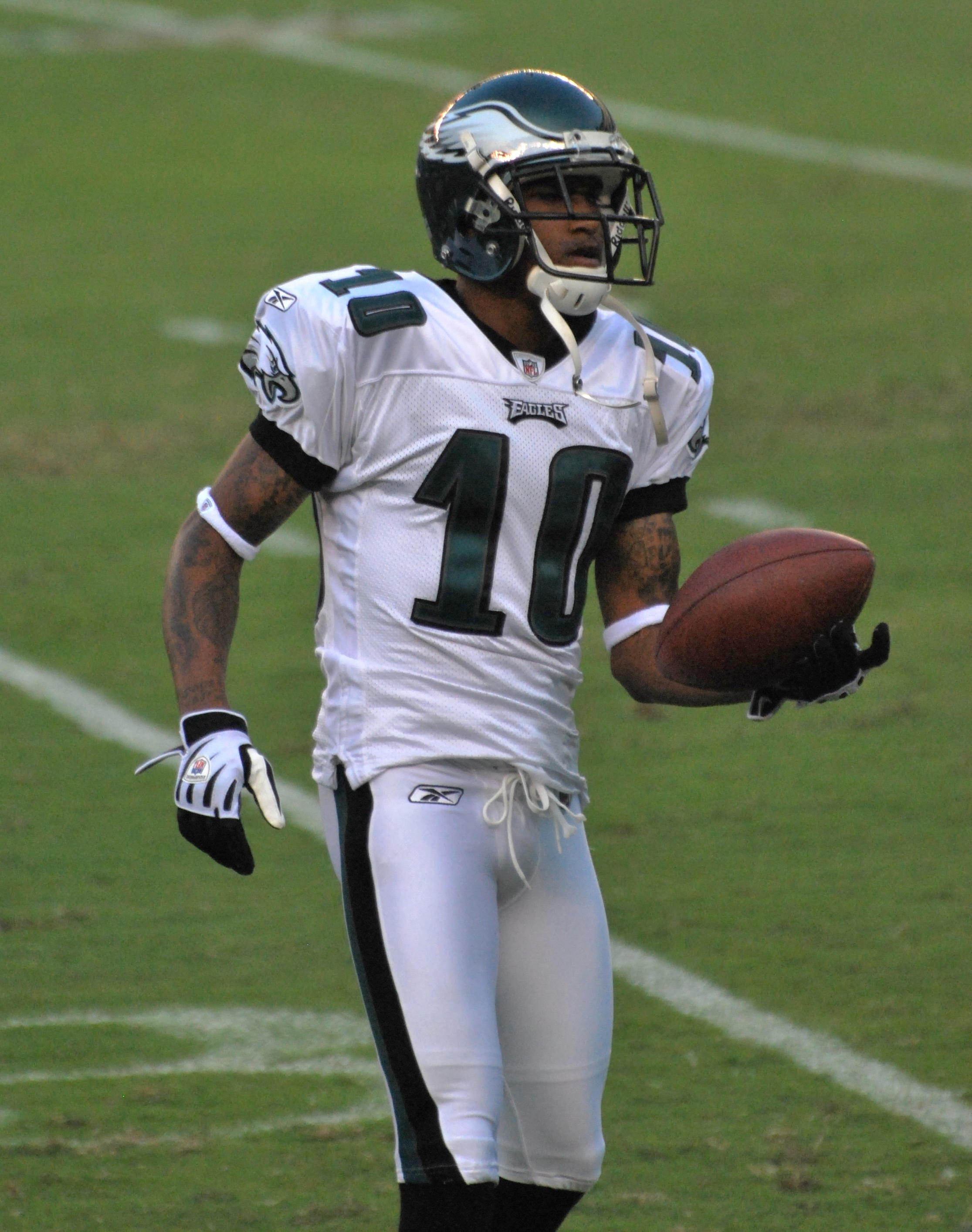
DeSean Jackson

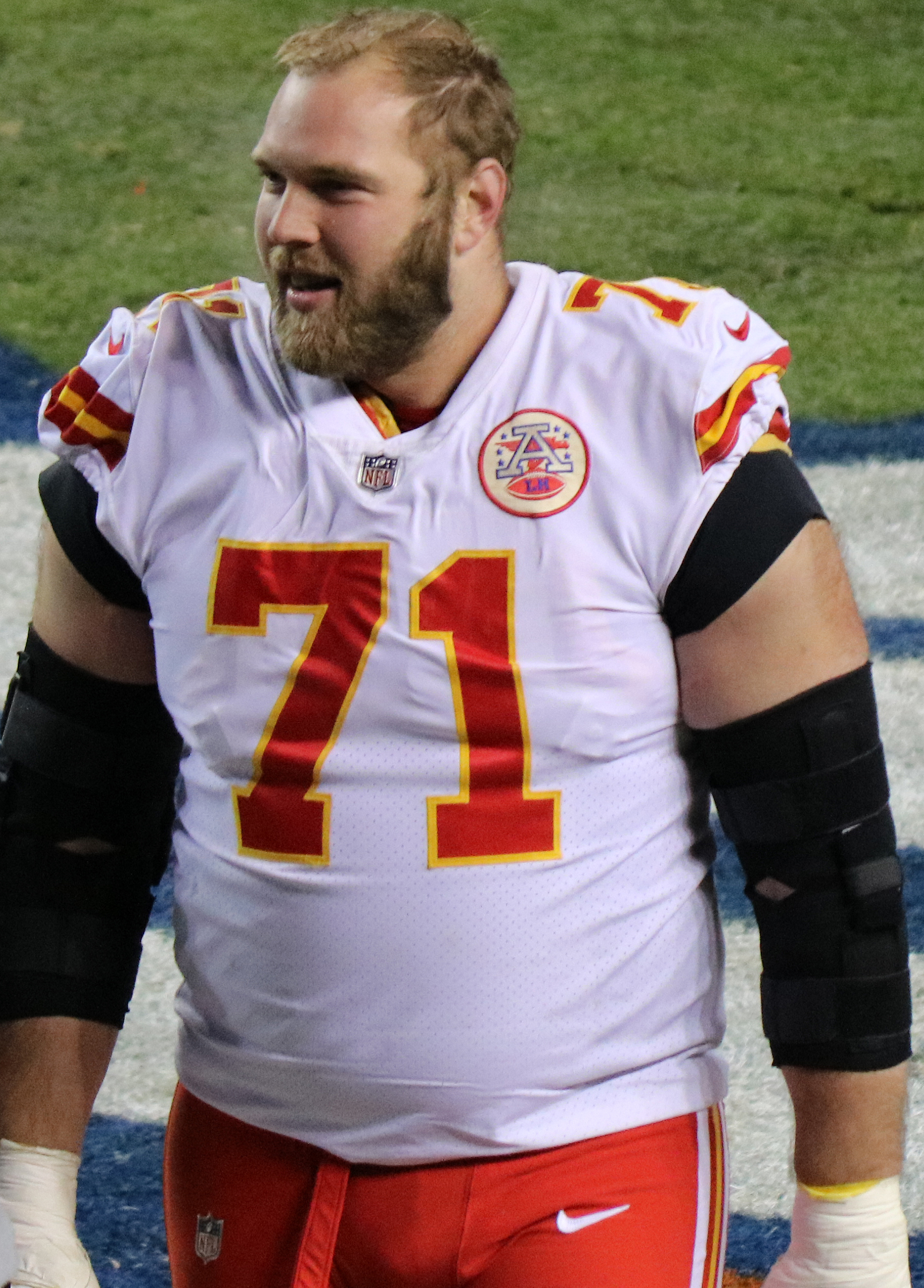
Mitchell Schwartz

== Baseball ==
- Geoff Blum – professional baseball player with the Houston Astros
- Brennan Boesch – professional baseball player with the New York Yankees
- Allen Craig (born 1984) – professional baseball player with the Boston Red Sox
- Mike Epstein (born 1943) – professional baseball player
- Brian Horwitz (born 1982) – professional baseball player
- Conor Jackson – professional baseball player with the Boston Red Sox
- Brett Jackson – 1st round of MLB 2009 Draft – MLB Chicago Cubs/ Arizona Diamondbacks
- Jackie Jensen – professional baseball player 1958 AL MVP Boston Red Sox
- Erik Johnson – drafted in 2011 by the Chicago White Sox
- Jeff Kent – professional baseball player with the Los Angeles Dodgers; 2000 NL MVP (SF Giants)
- Andrew Knapp (born 1991) – catcher for the Philadelphia Phillies
- Darren Lewis (born 1967) – OF for the San Francisco Giants and the Boston Red Sox
- Kevin Maas (born 1965) – 1B and DH for the New York Yankees
- Bob Melvin (born 1961) – MLB catcher and manager for the San Francisco Giants
- Brandon Morrow – professional pitcher for the Chicago Cubs
- Xavier Nady – MLB player for the Arizona Diamondbacks
- Tyson Ross – professional pitcher for the San Diego Padres
- Josh Satin (born 1984) – MLB player with the New York Mets
- Marcus Semien – MLB player for the Chicago White Sox / Oakland Athletics / Texas Rangers ( World Series Champion 2023 )
- Andrew Vaughn – professional baseball player for the Chicago White Sox, 3rd overall pick in 2019
- Tyler Walker (born 1976) – professional baseball player (previously for Washington Nationals)

== Basketball ==
- Shareef Abdur-Rahim – retired professional (NBA) basketball player
- Ryan Anderson – 1st round (21st overall) of the 2008 NBA draft, played for the New Orleans Pelicans and Houston Rockets
- Rod Benson (born 1984) – D-league standout
- Brittany Boyd – 1st round (9th overall) of the 2015 WNBA draft; currently plays for New York Liberty
- Jaylen Brown – No.3 pick in the 2016 NBA draft, NBA player for Boston Celtics, a 2021 NBA All-Star
- Geno Carlisle (born 1976)
- Layshia Clarendon – 1st round (9th overall) of 2013 WNBA draft; currently plays for Indiana Fever
- Allen Crabbe – 31st overall pick in 2013 by Cleveland Cavaliers and played for the Portland Trail Blazers and Brooklyn Nets
- Francisco Elson – 2007 NBA Champion with the San Antonio Spurs; currently playing in Iran
- Larry Friend – 2nd round (13th overall) of the 1957 draft
- Shahar Gordon (born 1980) – Israeli; played in the Israel Basketball Premier League and for the Israeli national basketball team
- Ed Gray – 1st round (22nd overall) of the 1997 draft to Atlanta Hawks
- Chuck Hanger – 2nd round (9th overall) of the 1948 BAA draft
- Devon Hardin – 2nd round (50th overall) of the 2008 NBA draft
- Darrall Imhoff – 1st round (3rd overall) of the 1960 draft (all-star)
- Kevin Johnson, B.A. 1997 – retired professional NBA basketball player; 2008–2016 mayor of Sacramento
- Harper Kamp – Basketball-Bundesliga Germany player for BG Göttingen
- Jason Kidd – retired professional NBA basketball player; Pac-12 Player of the Year; nine-time NBA All Star; 2011 NBA Champions; head coach of the Milwaukee Bucks 2014–2018
- Sean Lampley (born 1979)
- Sean Marks, B.A. 1998 – formerly played for the New Orleans Hornets,
- Mark McNamara – 1st round (22nd overall) of the 1982 NBA Draft
- Lamond Murray – former NBA forward who most recently played for the New Jersey Nets
- Leon Powe – drafted in 2006 by Denver Nuggets and played for the Boston Celtics
- Ivan Rabb – 2nd round (35th overall) of the 2017 NBA draft by the Orlando Magic and played for the Memphis Grizzlies
- Jamal Sampson – professional basketball player currently playing for Denver Nuggets
- D. J. Seeley (born 1989) – basketball player for Maccabi Tel Aviv of the Israeli Premier League and the Euroleague
- Sam Singer (born 1995) – American-Israeli basketball player for Israeli team Bnei Herzliya
- Amit Tamir (born 1979) – pro basketball player (Hapoel Jerusalem)
- Ashley Walker – 1st round (12th overall) of 2009 WNBA draft
- Tyrone Wallace – 2nd round (60th overall) of 2016 NBA Draft currently playing for the Turk Telekom of the Turkish Basketball Super League

== Football ==
- Chidi Ahanotu – 12-year NFL veteran DE
- Keenan Allen – 76th pick in the 2013 NFL draft for the San Diego Chargers
- Colin Allred – NFL linebacker for the Tennessee Titans, undrafted in 2006
- Tyson Alualu – defensive tackle for the Jacksonville Jaguars, #10 overall NFL draft pick in 2010
- C. J. Anderson – running back for the Los Angeles Rams
- Bryan Anger – 70th pick in the 2012 NFL draft for the Jacksonville Jaguars
- Marc Anthony – 247th pick in the 2013 NFL draft for the Baltimore Ravens
- J.J. Arrington – NFL running back for the Arizona Cardinals
- Nnamdi Asomugha, B.A. 2003 – NFL All-Pro cornerback for the Philadelphia Eagles
- Troy Auzenne – BA 1992, Cal Hall of Fame offensive tackle for the Chicago Bears and Indianapolis Colts
- Joe Ayoob – former Cal quarterback, current world paper airplane record holder
- Tully Banta-Cain – linebacker for the New England Patriots and San Francisco 49ers
- Steve Bartkowski – NFL QB, #1 overall NFL draft pick of 1975, NFL Rookie of the Year, two-time Pro Bowler
- Jahvid Best – running back for the Detroit Lions, #30 overall NFL draft pick in 2010
- David Binn – 1995 NFL longsnapper with the San Diego Chargers
- Desmond Bishop – NFL ILB Green Bay Packers #192 overall in 2007 Draft
- Kyle Boller – quarterback for St. Louis Rams
- Doug Brien – NFL kicker
- D. J. Campbell − 216th pick in the 2012 NFL draft for the Carolina Panthers
- Dana Carey − professional football player in the first American Football League with the Los Angeles Wildcats in 1926
- Andre Carter – defensive end for the Washington Redskins
- Sean Cattouse – NFL player
- Chris Conte – 93rd overall NFL draft pick in 2011 for the Chicago Bears
- Joe Cooper – NFL player
- Jake Curhan (born 1998) – American football offensive tackle for the Seattle Seahawks of the National Football League (NFL)
- Brian de la Puente (born 1985) – NFL player
- Thomas DeCoud – NFL safety with the Atlanta Falcons
- Ralph DeLoach – American football player
- Terrance Dotsy – American football player
- Dameane Douglas – American football player, played for the Philadelphia Eagles 1999–2002
- Herm Edwards – former cornerback for the Philadelphia Eagles, current head coach at Arizona State
- Jack Evans – quarterback for the Green Bay Packers
- Zack Follett – linebacker for the Detroit Lions
- Justin Forsett – NFL running back for the Baltimore Ravens
- Scott Fujita, B.A. 2001, M.A. 2002 – linebacker for the Cleveland Browns
- Derrick Gardner – American football player
- Mike Gibson – 184th pick in the 2008 NFL draft for the Philadelphia Eagles
- Tarik Glenn, B.A. 1999 – former offensive tackle for Indianapolis Colts, Super Bowl XLI champion
- Jared Goff – number 1 overall draft pick in the 2016 NFL draft; quarterback; taken by the Los Angeles Rams
- Tony Gonzalez – Pro Football Hall of Fame tight end for the Kansas City Chiefs and Atlanta Falcons, also played basketball at Berkeley
- Trevor Guyton − 219th pick in the 2012 NFL draft for the Minnesota Vikings
- Chris Harper – wide receiver for the New England Patriots
- Nick Harris – punter for the Detroit Lions
- Ken Harvey – linebacker for the Phoenix Cardinals and Washington Redskins
- Steve Hendrickson – LB and special teams player for the San Diego Chargers
- Daymeion Hughes – NFL CB Indianapolis Colts #95 overall in 2007 Draft
- Darryl Ingram – former NFL player
- DeSean Jackson – NFL wide receiver for the Tampa Bay Buccaneers
- Marvin Jones −166th pick in the 2012 NFL draft for the Cincinnati Bengals
- Cameron Jordan – 24th overall of the 2nd round of the NFL draft pick in 2011 for the New Orleans Saints
- Joe Kapp, B.A. 1960 – quarterback in the CFL and for the Minnesota Vikings
- Keala Keanaaina – American football fullback
- Mychal Kendricks – 46th pick in the 2012 NFL draft for the Philadelphia Eagles
- Perry Klein (born 1971) – American football quarterback in the National Football League; played for the Atlanta Falcons
- Jordan Kunaszyk – first team All-Pac-12 Conference and second team All-America by Sports Illustrated; linebacker for the Carolina Panthers and Washington Football Team
- L. P. Ladouceur – B.A. 2004 – NFL long snapper with the Dallas Cowboys
- Ryan Longwell – B.A. 1997 – NFL kicker with the Minnesota Vikings
- Marshawn Lynch – NFL running back Seattle Seahawks #12 overall in 2007 Draft
- Alex Mack – NFL center for the Cleveland Browns #21 overall in 2009 Draft
- Brandon Mebane – NFL DT Seattle Seahawks #85 overall in 2007 Draft
- Dan Melville – punter for the San Francisco 49ers
- Fernando Mendoza, B.A. 2024 – 2025 Heisman Trophy winner as quarterback of Indiana University #1 overall pick in 2026 Draft
- Aaron Merz, B.A. 2005 – NFL guard for the Buffalo Bills
- Mike Mohamed, B.A. 2010 – 189th overall NFL draft pick in 2011 for the Denver Broncos
- Craig Morton – quarterback under Marv Levy and Bill Walsh; one of two quarterbacks to ever start the Super Bowl for two different teams
- Harry Vance "Chuck" Muncie – NFL running back for the New Orleans Saints and the San Diego Chargers
- Jeremy Newberry – center for the Oakland Raiders
- Hardy Nickerson, B.A. 1989 – All-Pro NFL linebacker
- Ryan O'Callaghan – NFL guard with the New England Patriots
- Deltha O'Neal, B.A. 2000 – NFL cornerback with the Cincinnati Bengals
- Doug Parrish, B.A 2016 – NFL defensive back and return specialist in the CFL 1993 Greycup Champion
- Ken Pettway – American player of gridiron football
- Marvin Philip – NFL lineman for the Pittsburgh Steelers
- Bob Reinhard – AAFC and NFL player
- Ryan Riddle – NFL DE Oakland Raiders #212 overall in 2005 Draft, set single season sack record with 14.5 in the 2004 season
- Roy Riegels – member of the Rose Bowl Hall of Fame, famed for 1929 Rose Bowl where he was dubbed "Wrong Way"
- Ron Rivera – linebacker for the Chicago Bears and later head coach of the Carolina Panthers and Washington Redskins
- Aaron Rodgers (Class of 2004) – quarterback of the Green Bay Packers and regular season MVP when the Packers won the 2011 Super Bowl XLV, MVP of Super Bowl XLV and currently the Quarterback of the Pittsburgh Steelers
- Joe Rose – tight end with the Miami Dolphins, 1980–1985; caught first touchdown pass of Pro Football Hall of Fame quarterback Dan Marino
- Buck Saunders – blocking back for the Toledo Maroons
- Mitchell Schwartz, 2011 – 37th pick in the 2012 NFL draft for the Cleveland Browns, All-Pro for the Kansas City Chiefs
- Brian Schwenke – 107th pick in the 2013 NFL draft for the Tennessee Titans
- Andrew L. Smith – head coach of the powerhouse Cal football teams of the 1920s
- Byron Smith – NFL player
- Todd Steussie – offensive lineman for the Minnesota Vikings, Carolina Panthers, and St. Louis Rams
- John Sullivan – defensive back for the San Diego Chargers, Green Bay Packers, and San Francisco 49ers
- Syd'Quan Thompson – cornerback for the Denver Broncos, #225 overall NFL draft pick in 2010
- Bryce Treggs – NFL player
- John Tuggle – running back for the New York Giants
- Miles Turpin – linebacker for the Green Bay Packers and Tampa Bay Buccaneers
- Iheanyi Uwaezuoke – former NFL wide receiver
- Shane Vereen, B.A. 2010 – 56th overall NFL draft pick in 2011 for the New England Patriots
- Wesley Walker – former NFL player
- Tim Washington – defensive back for the San Francisco 49ers and Kansas City Chiefs
- Ed White, B.A. 1968 – Cal Hall of Fame, All-Pro NFL offensive lineman for the Minnesota Vikings and San Diego Chargers
- Josh White – American football player
- Russell White, B.A. 1993 – Cal Hall of Fame running back for the Rams
- Sherman White – defensive end for Cincinnati Bengals and Buffalo Bills; picked in the first round of the 1972 NFL draft
- Sam Williams – NFL player
- Steve Williams – 145th pick in the 2013 NFL draft for the San Diego Chargers

== Olympics ==
For a full list, see here.

- Nathan Adrian, B.A. 2012 – swimmer, eight-time Olympic-medalist, among the 10 most decorated Olympic swimmers of all time, winner of two gold medals and two bronze medals at the 2016 Summer Olympics in Rio de Janeiro, Brazil, winner of two gold medals and one silver medal at the 2012 Summer Olympics in London, England, winner of a gold medal at the 2008 Summer Olympics in Beijing, China
- Guy Barnea − Israeli Olympic swimmer
- Matt Biondi, B.A. 1988 – three-time Olympian, winner of eight gold medals
- Erin Cafaro, B.A. 2006 – Olympic crew, gold medalist at the 2008 Summer Olympics in Beijing, China and the 2012 Summer Olympics in London, England
- Hubert A. Caldwell, 1929 – Olympic crew, 1928 gold medalist
- Connie Carpenter-Phinney, B.A. 1981 – cycling gold medalist in 1984 Summer Olympics in Los Angeles, California
- Peter Cipollone, B.A. 1994 – coxswain for the gold medal-winning rowing team at the 2004 Summer Olympics in Athens, Greece
- Natalie Coughlin, B.A. 2005 – Olympic swimmer (winner of five medals, including two gold medals, at the 2004 Summer Olympics in Athens, Greece; at the 2008 Summer Olympics in Beijing, China, she became the first American female athlete to win six medals in one Olympics); three-time NCAA Swimmer of the Year
- Anthony Ervin – Olympic swimmer, has won four Olympic medals and two World Championship golds
- Joy Fawcett, B.A. 1992 – member of the gold winning United States women's soccer team at the 2004 Summer Olympics in Athens, and the 1996 Summer Olympics in Atlanta
- Missy Franklin, 2015 – 2012 Summer Olympic gold medalist
- Michele Granger, B.A. 1993 – softball pitcher and Olympic gold medalist
- Mark Henderson, 1991 – swimmer, gold medalist at the 1996 Summer Olympics where he broke the world record in the 400-meter medley swimming relay
- Burton Jastram, 1932 Olympic gold medalist in the Eights Competition
- Helene Mayer (1910–1953), German and American Olympic champion fencer
- Mary T. Meagher, B.A. 1987 – Olympic swimmer, winner of three gold medals; named one of CNNSI.com's 100 Greatest Women Athletes (ranked 17th)
- Alex Morgan, B.A. 2010 – National Women's Soccer League and United States women's national soccer team player (Orlando Pride), became the youngest player on the USWNT in the 2011 World Cup, gold medalist at the 2012 Summer Olympics
- Jonny Moseley, B.A. 2007 – gold medalist in 1998 Winter Olympics
- Heather Petri, B.S. 2002 – water polo player, gold medalist at the 2012 Summer Olympics in London, England
- Staciana Stitts, B.A. 2004 – Olympic swimmer, gold medalist in 2000 Summer Olympics in Sydney, Australia
- Dana Vollmer, B.A. 2009 – Olympic swimmer, gold medalist at the 2004 Summer Olympics in Athens, Greece, winner of three gold medals at the 2012 Summer Olympics in London, England
- Helen Wills, B.A. 1925 – tennis player; singles winner of eight Wimbledon titles, seven U.S. Open Championships, four French Opens, and two Olympic gold medals
- Elsie Windes, B.A. 2007 – water polo player, gold medalist at the 2012 Summer Olympics in London, England

Olympic medalists of the University of California, Berkeley
Name	Olympiad	Team	Event	Medal
Shareef Abdur-Rahim	Australia (2000 Sydney Summer Olympics)	United States	Basketball – Men's Team Tournament	Gold medal – first place
Nathan Adrian	China (2008 Beijing Summer Olympics)	United States	Swimming – Men's 4 × 100 metre freestyle relay	Gold medal – first place
Nathan Adrian	United Kingdom (2012 London Summer Olympics)	United States	Swimming – Men's 100 metre freestyle	Gold medal – first place
Nathan Adrian	United Kingdom (2012 London Summer Olympics)	United States	Swimming – Men's 4 × 100 metre medley relay	Gold medal – first place
Nathan Adrian	United Kingdom (2012 London Summer Olympics)	United States	Swimming – Men's 4 × 100 metre freestyle relay	Silver medal – second place
Nathan Adrian	Brazil (2016 Rio de Janeiro Summer Olympics)	United States	Swimming – Men's 4 × 100 metre freestyle relay	Gold medal – first place
Nathan Adrian	Brazil (2016 Rio de Janeiro Summer Olympics)	United States	Swimming – Men's 4 × 100 metre medley relay	Gold medal – first place
Nathan Adrian	Brazil (2016 Rio de Janeiro Summer Olympics)	United States	Swimming – Men's 100 metre freestyle	Bronze medal – third place
Nathan Adrian	Brazil (2016 Rio de Janeiro Summer Olympics)	United States	Swimming – Men's 50 metre freestyle	Bronze medal – third place
George Ahlgren	United Kingdom (1948 London Summer Olympics)	United States	Rowing – Men's eight	Gold medal – first place
Par Arvidsson	Soviet Union (1980 Moscow Summer Olympics)	Sweden	Swimming – Men's 100 metre butterfly	Gold medal – first place
Peter Asch	Germany (1972 Munich Summer Olympics)	United States	Water polo – Men's Team Tournament	Bronze medal – third place
Kathleen Baker	Brazil (2016 Rio de Janeiro Summer Olympics)	United States	Swimming – Women's 4 × 100 metre medley relay	Gold medal – first place
Kathleen Baker	Brazil (2016 Rio de Janeiro Summer Olympics)	United States	Swimming – Women's 100 metre backstroke	Silver medal – second place
Bengt Baron	Soviet Union (1980 Moscow Summer Olympics)	Sweden	Swimming – Men's 100 metre backstroke	Gold medal – first place
Bengt Baron	United States of America (1984 Los Angeles Summer Olympics)	Sweden	Swimming – Men's 4 × 100 metre freestyle relay	Bronze medal – third place
Sebastian Bea	Australia (2000 Sydney Summer Olympics)	United States	Rowing – Men's coxless pair	Silver medal – second place
Matt Biondi	United States of America (1984 Los Angeles Summer Olympics)	United States	Swimming – Men's 4 × 100 metre freestyle relay	Gold medal – first place
Matt Biondi	South Korea (1988 Seoul Summer Olympics)	United States	Swimming – Men's 100 metre freestyle	Gold medal – first place
Matt Biondi	South Korea (1988 Seoul Summer Olympics)	United States	Swimming – Men's 4 × 100 metre freestyle relay	Gold medal – first place
Matt Biondi	South Korea (1988 Seoul Summer Olympics)	United States	Swimming – Men's 4 × 100 metre medley relay	Gold medal – first place
Matt Biondi	South Korea (1988 Seoul Summer Olympics)	United States	Swimming – Men's 4 × 200 metre freestyle relay	Gold medal – first place
Matt Biondi	South Korea (1988 Seoul Summer Olympics)	United States	Swimming – Men's 50 metre freestyle	Gold medal – first place
Matt Biondi	South Korea (1988 Seoul Summer Olympics)	United States	Swimming – Men's 100 metre butterfly	Silver medal – second place
Matt Biondi	South Korea (1988 Seoul Summer Olympics)	United States	Swimming – Men's 200 metre freestyle	Bronze medal – third place
Matt Biondi	Spain (1992 Barcelona Summer Olympics)	United States	Swimming – Men's 4 × 100 metre freestyle relay	Gold medal – first place
Matt Biondi	Spain (1992 Barcelona Summer Olympics)	United States	Swimming – Men's 4 × 100 metre medley relay	Gold medal – first place
Matt Biondi	Spain (1992 Barcelona Summer Olympics)	United States	Swimming – Men's 50 metre freestyle	Silver medal – second place
James Blair	United States of America (1932 Los Angeles Summer Olympics)	United States	Rowing – Men's eight	Gold medal – first place
Donald Blessing	Netherlands (1928 Amsterdam Summer Olympics)	United States	Rowing – Men's eight	Gold medal – first place
Rachel Bootsma	United Kingdom (2012 London Summer Olympics)	United States	Swimming – Women's 4 × 100 metre medley relay	Gold medal – first place
Gillian Boxx	United States of America (1996 Atlanta Summer Olympics)	United States	Softball – Women's Team Tournament	Gold medal – first place
John M. Brinck	Netherlands (1928 Amsterdam Summer Olympics)	United States	Rowing – Men's eight	Gold medal – first place
David Brown	United Kingdom (1948 London Summer Olympics)	United States	Rowing – Men's eight	Gold medal – first place
Lloyd Butler	United Kingdom (1948 London Summer Olympics)	United States	Rowing – Men's eight	Gold medal – first place
Erin Cafaro	China (2008 Beijing Summer Olympics)	United States	Rowing – Women's eight	Gold medal – first place
Erin Cafaro	United Kingdom (2012 London Summer Olympics)	United States	Rowing – Women's eight	Gold medal – first place
Hubert A. Caldwell	Netherlands (1928 Amsterdam Summer Olympics)	United States	Rowing – Men's eight	Gold medal – first place
Milorad Cavic	China (2008 Beijing Summer Olympics)	Serbia	Swimming – Men's 100 metre butterfly	Silver medal – second place
Charles Chandler	United States of America (1932 Los Angeles Summer Olympics)	United States	Rowing – Men's eight	Gold medal – first place
Brandi Chastain	United States of America (1996 Atlanta Summer Olympics)	United States	Football – Women's Team Tournament	Gold medal – first place
Brandi Chastain	Australia (2000 Sydney Summer Olympics)	United States	Football – Women's Team Tournament	Silver medal – second place
Peter Cipollone	Greece (2004 Athens Summer Olympics)	United States	Rowing – Men's eight	Gold medal – first place
Bob Clark	Germany (1936 Berlin Summer Olympics)	United States	Athletics – Men's decathlon	Silver medal – second place
Natalie Coughlin	Greece (2004 Athens Summer Olympics)	United States	Swimming – Women's 100 metre backstroke	Gold medal – first place
Natalie Coughlin	Greece (2004 Athens Summer Olympics)	United States	Swimming – Women's 4 × 200 metre freestyle relay	Gold medal – first place
Natalie Coughlin	Greece (2004 Athens Summer Olympics)	United States	Swimming – Women's 4 × 100 metre freestyle relay	Silver medal – second place
Natalie Coughlin	Greece (2004 Athens Summer Olympics)	United States	Swimming – Women's 4 × 100 metre medley relay	Silver medal – second place
Natalie Coughlin	Greece (2004 Athens Summer Olympics)	United States	Swimming – Women's 100 metre freestyle	Bronze medal – third place
Natalie Coughlin	China (2008 Beijing Summer Olympics)	United States	Swimming – Women's 100 metre backstroke	Gold medal – first place
Natalie Coughlin	China (2008 Beijing Summer Olympics)	United States	Swimming – Women's 4 × 100 metre freestyle relay	Silver medal – second place
Natalie Coughlin	China (2008 Beijing Summer Olympics)	United States	Swimming – Women's 4 × 100 metre medley relay	Silver medal – second place
Natalie Coughlin	China (2008 Beijing Summer Olympics)	United States	Swimming – Women's 100 metre freestyle	Bronze medal – third place
Natalie Coughlin	China (2008 Beijing Summer Olympics)	United States	Swimming – Women's 200 metre individual medley	Bronze medal – third place
Natalie Coughlin	China (2008 Beijing Summer Olympics)	United States	Swimming – Women's 4 × 200 metre freestyle relay	Bronze medal – third place
Natalie Coughlin	United Kingdom (2012 London Summer Olympics)	United States	Swimming – Women's 4 × 100 metre freestyle relay	Bronze medal – third place
Tammy Crow	Greece (2004 Athens Summer Olympics)	United States	Synchronized swimming – Team	Bronze medal – third place
Ann Curtis Cuneo	United Kingdom (1948 London Summer Olympics)	United States	Swimming – Women's 4 × 100 metre freestyle relay	Gold medal – first place
Ann Curtis Cuneo	United Kingdom (1948 London Summer Olympics)	United States	Swimming – Women's 400 metre freestyle	Gold medal – first place
Ann Curtis Cuneo	United Kingdom (1948 London Summer Olympics)	United States	Swimming – Women's 100 metre freestyle	Silver medal – second place
William Dally	Netherlands (1928 Amsterdam Summer Olympics)	United States	Rowing – Men's eight	Gold medal – first place
Megan Dirkmaat	Greece (2004 Athens Summer Olympics)	United States	Rowing – Women's eight	Silver medal – second place
George Dixon	France (1924 Paris Summer Olympics)	United States	Rugby union – Men's Team Tournament	Gold medal – first place
Peter Donlon	Netherlands (1928 Amsterdam Summer Olympics)	United States	Rowing – Men's eight	Gold medal – first place
Duje Draganja	Greece (2004 Athens Summer Olympics)	Croatia	Swimming – Men's 50 metre freestyle	Silver medal – second place
David Dunlap	United States of America (1932 Los Angeles Summer Olympics)	United States	Rowing – Men's eight	Gold medal – first place
Philip Durbrow	Japan (1964 Tokyo Summer Olympics)	United States	Rowing – Men's coxless four	Bronze medal – third place
Anthony Ervin	Australia (2000 Sydney Summer Olympics)	United States	Swimming – Men's 50 metre freestyle	Gold medal – first place
Anthony Ervin	Australia (2000 Sydney Summer Olympics)	United States	Swimming – Men's 4 × 100 metre freestyle relay	Silver medal – second place
Anthony Ervin	Brazil (2016 Rio de Janeiro Summer Olympics)	United States	Swimming – Men's 4 × 100 metre freestyle relay	Gold medal – first place
Anthony Ervin	Brazil (2016 Rio de Janeiro Summer Olympics)	United States	Swimming – Men's 50 metre freestyle	Gold medal – first place
Joy (Biefeld) Fawcett	United States of America (1996 Atlanta Summer Olympics)	United States	Football – Women's Team Tournament	Gold medal – first place
Joy (Biefeld) Fawcett	Australia (2000 Sydney Summer Olympics)	United States	Football – Women's Team Tournament	Silver medal – second place
Joy (Biefeld) Fawcett	Greece (2004 Athens Summer Olympics)	United States	Football – Women's Team Tournament	Gold medal – first place
George Fish	Belgium (1920 Antwerp Summer Olympics)	United States	Rugby union – Men's Team Tournament	Gold medal – first place
Scott Frandsen	China (2008 Beijing Summer Olympics)	Canada	Rowing – Men's coxless pair	Silver medal – second place
Missy Franklin	United Kingdom (2012 London Summer Olympics)	United States	Swimming – Women's 100 metre backstroke	Gold medal – first place
Missy Franklin	United Kingdom (2012 London Summer Olympics)	United States	Swimming – Women's 200 metre backstroke	Gold medal – first place
Missy Franklin	United Kingdom (2012 London Summer Olympics)	United States	Swimming – Women's 4 × 100 metre medley relay	Gold medal – first place
Missy Franklin	United Kingdom (2012 London Summer Olympics)	United States	Swimming – Women's 4 × 200 metre freestyle relay	Gold medal – first place
Missy Franklin	United Kingdom (2012 London Summer Olympics)	United States	Swimming – Women's 4 × 100 metre freestyle relay	Bronze medal – third place
Missy Franklin	Brazil (2016 Rio de Janeiro Summer Olympics)	United States	Swimming – Women's 4 × 200 metre freestyle relay	Gold medal – first place
Francis Frederick	Netherlands (1928 Amsterdam Summer Olympics)	United States	Rowing – Men's eight	Gold medal – first place
Vicky Galindo	China (2008 Beijing Summer Olympics)	United States	Softball – Women's Team Tournament	Silver medal – second place
Sue Gossick	Mexico (1968 Mexico City Summer Olympics)	United States	Diving – Women's 3 metre springboard	Gold medal – first place
Ed "Mush" Graff	France (1924 Paris Summer Olympics)	United States	Rugby union – Men's Team Tournament	Gold medal – first place
Norris Graham	United States of America (1932 Los Angeles Summer Olympics)	United States	Rowing – Men's eight	Gold medal – first place
Michele Granger	United States of America (1996 Atlanta Summer Olympics)	United States	Softball – Women's Team Tournament	Gold medal – first place
Duncan Gregg	United States of America (1932 Los Angeles Summer Olympics)	United States	Rowing – Men's eight	Gold medal – first place
Winslow Hall	United States of America (1932 Los Angeles Summer Olympics)	United States	Rowing – Men's eight	Gold medal – first place
Brutus Hamilton	Belgium (1920 Antwerp Summer Olympics)	United States	Athletics – Men's decathlon	Silver medal – second place
Jessica Hardy	United Kingdom (2012 London Summer Olympics)	United States	Swimming – Women's 4 × 100 metre medley relay	Gold medal – first place
Jessica Hardy	United Kingdom (2012 London Summer Olympics)	United States	Swimming – Women's 4 × 100 metre freestyle relay	Bronze medal – third place
Jim Hardy	United Kingdom (1948 London Summer Olympics)	United States	Rowing – Men's eight	Gold medal – first place
Eddie Hart	Germany (1972 Munich Summer Olympics)	United States	Athletics – Men's 4 × 100 metres relay	Gold medal – first place
Mary Harvey	United States of America (1996 Atlanta Summer Olympics)	United States	Football – Women's Team Tournament	Gold medal – first place
Mark Henderson	United States of America (1996 Atlanta Summer Olympics)	United States	Swimming – Men's 4 × 100 metre medley relay	Gold medal – first place
Pelle Holmertz	Soviet Union (1980 Moscow Summer Olympics)	Sweden	Swimming – Men's 100 metre freestyle	Silver medal – second place
Chris Huffins	Australia (2000 Sydney Summer Olympics)	United States	Athletics – Men's decathlon	Bronze medal – third place
Darrall Imhoff	Italy (1960 Rome Summer Olympics)	United States	Basketball – Men's Team Tournament	Gold medal – first place
Sara Isakovic	China (2008 Beijing Summer Olympics)	Slovenia	Swimming – Women's 200 metre freestyle	Silver medal – second place
Scott Jaffe	Spain (1992 Barcelona Summer Olympics)	United States	Swimming – Men's 4 × 200 metre freestyle relay	Bronze medal – third place
Helen Jameson	Soviet Union (1980 Moscow Summer Olympics)	Great Britain	Swimming – Women's 4 × 100 metre medley relay	Silver medal – second place
Burton Jastram	United States of America (1932 Los Angeles Summer Olympics)	United States	Rowing – Men's eight	Gold medal – first place
Courtney Johnson	Australia (2000 Sydney Summer Olympics)	United States	Water polo – Women's Team Tournament	Silver medal – second place
Sheryl Johnson	United States of America (1984 Los Angeles Summer Olympics)	United States	Field hockey – Women's Team Tournament	Bronze medal – third place
Jason Kidd	Australia (2000 Sydney Summer Olympics)	United States	Basketball – Men's Team Tournament	Gold medal – first place
Bob Kiesel	United States of America (1932 Los Angeles Summer Olympics)	United States	Athletics – Men's 4 × 100 metres relay	Gold medal – first place
Leamon King	Australia (1956 Melbourne Summer Olympics)	United States	Athletics – Men's 4 × 100 metres relay	Gold medal – first place
Paul Kingsman	South Korea (1988 Seoul Summer Olympics)	New Zealand	Swimming – Men's 200 metre backstroke	Bronze medal – third place
Kara Kohler	United Kingdom (2012 London Summer Olympics)	United States	Rowing – Women's quadruple sculls	Bronze medal – third place
Laurel Korholz	Greece (2004 Athens Summer Olympics)	United States	Rowing – Women's eight	Silver medal – second place
Oleg Kosiak	United States of America (1996 Atlanta Summer Olympics)	Ukraine	Gymnastics – Men's Team	Bronze medal – third place
Ludy Langer	Belgium (1920 Antwerp Summer Olympics)	United States	Swimming – Men's 400 metre freestyle	Silver medal – second place
Thomas Lejdstrom	United States of America (1984 Los Angeles Summer Olympics)	Sweden	Swimming – Men's 4 × 100 metre freestyle relay	Bronze medal – third place
Caitlin Leverenz	United Kingdom (2012 London Summer Olympics)	United States	Swimming – Women's 200 metre individual medley	Bronze medal – third place
Harry Liversedge	Belgium (1920 Antwerp Summer Olympics)	United States	Athletics – Men's shot put	Bronze medal – third place
Carli Lloyd	Brazil (2016 Rio de Janeiro Summer Olympics)	United States	Volleyball – Women's Team Tournament	Bronze medal – third place
Ericka Lorenz	Australia (2000 Sydney Summer Olympics)	United States	Water polo – Women's Team Tournament	Silver medal – second place
Ericka Lorenz	Greece (2004 Athens Summer Olympics)	United States	Water polo – Women's Team Tournament	Bronze medal – third place
Agneta Martensson	Soviet Union (1980 Moscow Summer Olympics)	Sweden	Swimming – Women's 4 × 100 metre freestyle relay	Silver medal – second place
Holly McPeak	Greece (2004 Athens Summer Olympics)	United States	Volleyball – Women's beach volleyball	Bronze medal – third place
Mary T. Meagher	United States of America (1984 Los Angeles Summer Olympics)	United States	Swimming – Women's 100 metre butterfly	Gold medal – first place
Mary T. Meagher	United States of America (1984 Los Angeles Summer Olympics)	United States	Swimming – Women's 200 metre butterfly	Gold medal – first place
Mary T. Meagher	United States of America (1984 Los Angeles Summer Olympics)	United States	Swimming – Women's 4 × 100 metre medley relay	Gold medal – first place
Mary T. Meagher	South Korea (1988 Seoul Summer Olympics)	United States	Swimming – Women's 200 metre butterfly	Bronze medal – third place
Charles Mehan	Belgium (1920 Antwerp Summer Olympics)	United States	Rugby union – Men's Team Tournament	Gold medal – first place
George D. Mitchell	France (1924 Paris Summer Olympics)	United States	Water polo – Men's Team Tournament	Bronze medal – third place
Alex Morgan	United Kingdom (2012 London Summer Olympics)	United States	Football – Women's Team Tournament	Gold medal – first place
Jonny Moseley	Japan (1998 Nagano Winter Olympics)	United States	Freestyle skiing – Men's moguls	Gold medal – first place
Harold "Brick" Muller	Belgium (1920 Antwerp Summer Olympics)	United States	Athletics – Men's high jump	Silver medal – second place
Ryan Murphy	Brazil (2016 Rio de Janeiro Summer Olympics)	United States	Swimming – Men's 100 metre backstroke	Gold medal – first place
Ryan Murphy	Brazil (2016 Rio de Janeiro Summer Olympics)	United States	Swimming – Men's 200 metre backstroke	Gold medal – first place
Ryan Murphy	Brazil (2016 Rio de Janeiro Summer Olympics)	United States	Swimming – Men's 4 × 100 metre medley relay	Gold medal – first place
John Mykkanen	United States of America (1984 Los Angeles Summer Olympics)	United States	Swimming – Men's 400 metre freestyle	Silver medal – second place
Edgar Nemir	United States of America (1932 Los Angeles Summer Olympics)	United States	Wrestling at the 1932 Summer Olympics	Silver medal – second place
Lowell North	Japan (1964 Tokyo Summer Olympics)	United States	Sailing – Dragon	Bronze medal – third place
Maureen O'Toole	Australia (2000 Sydney Summer Olympics)	United States	Water polo – Women's Team Tournament	Silver medal – second place
Heather Petri	Australia (2000 Sydney Summer Olympics)	United States	Water polo – Women's Team Tournament	Silver medal – second place
Heather Petri	Greece (2004 Athens Summer Olympics)	United States	Water polo – Women's Team Tournament	Bronze medal – third place
Heather Petri	China (2008 Beijing Summer Olympics)	United States	Water polo – Women's Team Tournament	Silver medal – second place
Heather Petri	United Kingdom (2012 London Summer Olympics)	United States	Water polo – Women's Team Tournament	Gold medal – first place
Connie Carpenter Phinney	United States of America (1984 Los Angeles Summer Olympics)	United States	Cycling – Women's individual road race	Gold medal – first place
Marcella Place	United States of America (1984 Los Angeles Summer Olympics)	United States	Field hockey – Women's Team Tournament	Bronze medal – third place
Josh Prenot	Brazil (2016 Rio de Janeiro Summer Olympics)	United States	Swimming – Men's 200 metre breaststroke	Silver medal – second place
Ralph Purchase	United Kingdom (1948 London Summer Olympics)	United States	Rowing – Men's eight	Gold medal – first place
Kevin Robertson	United States of America (1984 Los Angeles Summer Olympics)	United States	Water polo – Men's Team Tournament	Silver medal – second place
Kevin Robertson	South Korea (1988 Seoul Summer Olympics)	United States	Water polo – Men's Team Tournament	Silver medal – second place
Peter Rocca	Canada (1976 Montreal Summer Olympics)	United States	Swimming – Men's 4 × 100 metre medley relay	Gold medal – first place
Peter Rocca	Canada (1976 Montreal Summer Olympics)	United States	Swimming – Men's 100 metre backstroke	Silver medal – second place
Peter Rocca	Canada (1976 Montreal Summer Olympics)	United States	Swimming – Men's 200 metre backstroke	Silver medal – second place
Edwin Salisbury	United States of America (1932 Los Angeles Summer Olympics)	United States	Rowing – Men's eight	Gold medal – first place
Aleksa Saponjic	United Kingdom (2012 London Summer Olympics)	Serbia	Water polo – Men's Team Tournament	Bronze medal – third place
Jill Savery	United States of America (1996 Atlanta Summer Olympics)	United States	Synchronized swimming – Women's Team	Gold medal – first place
George Schroth	France (1924 Paris Summer Olympics)	United States	Water polo – Men's Team Tournament	Bronze medal – third place
Tom Shields	Brazil (2016 Rio de Janeiro Summer Olympics)	United States	Swimming – Men's 4 × 100 metre medley relay	Gold medal – first place
Olivier Sigelaar	Brazil (2016 Rio de Janeiro Summer Olympics)	Netherlands	Rowing – Men's eight	Bronze medal – third place
Emily Silver	China (2008 Beijing Summer Olympics)	United States	Swimming – Women's 4 × 100 metre freestyle relay	Silver medal – second place
Colby Slater	Belgium (1920 Antwerp Summer Olympics)	United States	Rugby union – Men's Team Tournament	Gold medal – first place
Colby Slater	France (1924 Paris Summer Olympics)	United States	Rugby union – Men's Team Tournament	Gold medal – first place
Graham Smith	Canada (1976 Montreal Summer Olympics)	Canada	Swimming – Men's 4 × 100 metre medley relay	Silver medal – second place
Guinn Smith	United Kingdom (1948 London Summer Olympics)	United States	Athletics – Men's pole vault	Gold medal – first place
Justus Smith	United Kingdom (1948 London Summer Olympics)	United States	Rowing – Men's eight	Gold medal – first place
John Stack	United Kingdom (1948 London Summer Olympics)	United States	Rowing – Men's eight	Gold medal – first place
Marvin F. Stalder	Netherlands (1928 Amsterdam Summer Olympics)	United States	Rowing – Men's eight	Gold medal – first place
Dave Steen	South Korea (1988 Seoul Summer Olympics)	Canada	Athletics – Men's decathlon	Bronze medal – third place
Staciana Stitts	Australia (2000 Sydney Summer Olympics)	United States	Swimming – Women's 4 × 100 metre medley relay	Gold medal – first place
Jon Svendsen	United States of America (1984 Los Angeles Summer Olympics)	United States	Water polo – Men's Team Tournament	Silver medal – second place
Roser Tarrago	United Kingdom (2012 London Summer Olympics)	Spain	Water polo – Women's Team Tournament	Silver medal – second place
Margot Thien	United States of America (1996 Atlanta Summer Olympics)	United States	Synchronized swimming – Women's Team	Gold medal – first place
Joel Thomas	Spain (1992 Barcelona Summer Olympics)	United States	Swimming – Men's 4 × 100 metre freestyle relay	Gold medal – first place
William Thompson	Netherlands (1928 Amsterdam Summer Olympics)	United States	Rowing – Men's eight	Gold medal – first place
Charles Lee Tilden, Jr.	Belgium (1920 Antwerp Summer Olympics)	United States	Rugby union – Men's Team Tournament	Gold medal – first place
Charles Lee Tilden, Jr.	France (1924 Paris Summer Olympics)	United States	Rugby union – Men's Team Tournament	Gold medal – first place
Harold Tower	United States of America (1932 Los Angeles Summer Olympics)	United States	Rowing – Men's eight	Gold medal – first place
Nion Tucker	Switzerland (1928 St. Moritz (Winter) Winter Olympics)	United States	Bobsleigh	Gold medal – first place
Ed Turkington	France (1924 Paris Summer Olympics)	United States	Rugby union – Men's Team Tournament	Gold medal – first place
David Turner	United Kingdom (1948 London Summer Olympics)	United States	Rowing – Men's eight	Gold medal – first place
Ian Turner	United Kingdom (1948 London Summer Olympics)	United States	Rowing – Men's eight	Gold medal – first place
Conny van Bentum	Soviet Union (1980 Moscow Summer Olympics)	Netherlands	Swimming – Women's 4 × 100 metre freestyle relay	Bronze medal – third place
Conny van Bentum	United States of America (1984 Los Angeles Summer Olympics)	Netherlands	Swimming – Women's 4 × 100 metre freestyle relay	Silver medal – second place
Conny van Bentum	South Korea (1988 Seoul Summer Olympics)	Netherlands	Swimming – Women's 4 × 100 metre freestyle relay	Silver medal – second place
Dana Vollmer	Greece (2004 Athens Summer Olympics)	United States	Swimming – Women's 4 × 200 metre freestyle relay	Gold medal – first place
Dana Vollmer	United Kingdom (2012 London Summer Olympics)	United States	Swimming – Women's 100 metre butterfly	Gold medal – first place
Dana Vollmer	United Kingdom (2012 London Summer Olympics)	United States	Swimming – Women's 4 × 100 metre medley relay	Gold medal – first place
Dana Vollmer	United Kingdom (2012 London Summer Olympics)	United States	Swimming – Women's 4 × 200 metre freestyle relay	Gold medal – first place
Dana Vollmer	Brazil (2016 Rio de Janeiro Summer Olympics)	United States	Swimming – Women's 4 × 100 metre medley relay	Gold medal – first place
Dana Vollmer	Brazil (2016 Rio de Janeiro Summer Olympics)	United States	Swimming – Women's 4 × 100 metre freestyle relay	Silver medal – second place
Dana Vollmer	Brazil (2016 Rio de Janeiro Summer Olympics)	United States	Swimming – Women's 100 metre butterfly	Bronze medal – third place
Abbey Weitzeil	Brazil (2016 Rio de Janeiro Summer Olympics)	United States	Swimming – Women's 4 × 100 metre medley relay	Gold medal – first place
Abbey Weitzeil	Brazil (2016 Rio de Janeiro Summer Olympics)	United States	Swimming – Women's 4 × 100 metre freestyle relay	Silver medal – second place
Barry Weitzenberg	Germany (1972 Munich Summer Olympics)	United States	Water polo – Men's Team Tournament	Bronze medal – third place
Tommy Werner	Spain (1992 Barcelona Summer Olympics)	Sweden	Swimming – Men's 4 × 200 metre freestyle relay	Silver medal – second place
Jake Wetzel	Greece (2004 Athens Summer Olympics)	Canada	Rowing – Men's coxless four	Silver medal – second place
Jake Wetzel	China (2008 Beijing Summer Olympics)	Canada	Rowing – Men's eight	Gold medal – first place
Hazel Hotchkiss Wightman	France (1924 Paris Summer Olympics)	United States	Tennis – Mixed doubles	Gold medal – first place
Hazel Hotchkiss Wightman	France (1924 Paris Summer Olympics)	United States	Tennis – Women's doubles	Gold medal – first place
Archie Williams	Germany (1936 Berlin Summer Olympics)	United States	Athletics – Men's 400 metres	Gold medal – first place
Helen Wills	France (1924 Paris Summer Olympics)	United States	Tennis – Women's doubles	Gold medal – first place
Helen Wills	France (1924 Paris Summer Olympics)	United States	Tennis – Women's singles	Gold medal – first place
Dave Wilson	United States of America (1984 Los Angeles Summer Olympics)	United States	Swimming – Men's 100 metre backstroke	Silver medal – second place
Elsie Windes	China (2008 Beijing Summer Olympics)	United States	Water polo – Women's Team Tournament	Silver medal – second place
Elsie Windes	United Kingdom (2012 London Summer Olympics)	United States	Water polo – Women's Team Tournament	Gold medal – first place
James Duarte Winston	Belgium (1920 Antwerp Summer Olympics)	United States	Rugby union – Men's Team Tournament	Gold medal – first place
James Workman	Netherlands (1928 Amsterdam Summer Olympics)	United States	Rowing – Men's eight	Gold medal – first place
Jack Yerman	Italy (1960 Rome Summer Olympics)	United States	Athletics – Men's 4 × 400 metres relay	Gold medal – first place

== Soccer ==
- Steve Birnbaum (born 1991) – Major League Soccer player
- Servando Carrasco, 2010 – professional soccer player for Fort Lauderdale CF
- Andrew Jacobson (born 1985) – Major League Soccer player
- Leonard Krupnik, 2000 – Ukrainian-born American-Israeli professional soccer player for NY Red Bulls and Maccabi Haifa F.C., current soccer coach
- Karlie Lema, 2024 – National Women's Soccer League player, Bay FC
- Alex Morgan, B.A. 2011 – leader of the USWNT 2019 FIFA Women's World Cup team; former professional player with San Diego Wave FC
- Derek Van Rheenen, B.A. 1986, M.A. 1993, PhD 1997 – professional soccer player with San Francisco Bay Blackhawks, 1991 and 1993 All Star; on faculty
- Sam Witteman – soccer player, National Women's Soccer League, Orlando Pride
- Peter Woodring, B.A. 1990 – professional soccer player in Europe and U.S., including Major League Soccer; played three games for the U.S. national team; currently senior vice president and portfolio manager at Cephus Capital Management

== Swimming ==
- Nathan Adrian – swimmer
- Jack Alexy – swimmer
- Matt Biondi – swimmer
- Marina García Urzainqui – Spanish swimmer
- Hugo González – Spanish swimmer
- Trenton Julian – swimmer
- John Morgan – Paralympic swimmer
- Lea Polonsky (born 2002) – Israeli swimmer
- Tom Shields – swimmer
- Seth Stubblefield – swimmer

== Tennis ==
- Doug Eisenman (born 1968) – tennis player
- Helen Jacobs (1908–1997) – tennis player ranked world #1
- Michael Russell – tennis player
- Oskar Wikberg – tennis player

== Other ==
- Mykolas Alekna (class of 2025) – discus thrower and current world record holder
- Kamalani Dung (class of 2020) – professional softball player and gold and bronze medalist
- Mark Bingham – rugby player; foiled attempted hijacking of United Flight 93 during the September 11 attacks
- Megan Cooke – professional rower
- Shaney Fink – volleyball player and athletic director at Seattle University
- Allison Stokke Fowler – track and field athlete, pole vaulter and fitness model, internet phenomenon
- Jolene Henderson – professional softball player
- Max Homa (born 1990) – PGA Tour Pro golfer; 2013 NCAA champion; winner of the 2019 Wells Fargo Championship
- Erwin Klein (died 1992) – table tennis player
- Bill Lester, B.S. 1984 – NASCAR driver, sixth African-American to start a NEXTEL Cup race
- Rue Mapp – outdoor enthusiast and environmentalist
- Kent Mitchell – Berkeley law degree 1965 – Olympic champion coxswain
- Collin Morikawa – PGA Tour Pro; 2020 PGA Championship winner
- Gregory Peck – rower
- Jacki Sorensen – inventor of aerobic dancing (aerobics)
- Leigh Steinberg – B.A. 1970, J.D. 1973 – innovative sports agent whose life story was fictionalized in the film Jerry Maguire; former UC student body president who wrangled with Ronald Reagan over the People's Park imbroglio
