= 2007 in France =

- Decades: 1980s; 1990s; 2000s; 2010s; 2020s
- See also: History of France; Timeline of French history; List of years in France

This article lists events from the year 2007 in France.

== Incumbents ==
- President: Jacques Chirac (until 17 May), Nicolas Sarkozy (starting 17 May)
- Prime Minister: Dominique de Villepin (until 17 May), François Fillon (starting 17 May)

== Events ==
=== January – March ===
- 5 January – Citroën officially launches the Citroën C4 Picasso range of MPV's.
- 1 March – Airbus announces that it will cease work indefinitely on the A380F freight aircraft.

=== April – June ===
- 22 April – The first round of the presidential election takes place.
- 6 May – Nicolas Sarkozy is elected President, defeating Ségolène Royal with 53% of the vote in the Presidential Election.
- 16 May – Sarkozy officially becomes President after taking over from Jacques Chirac.
- 10 June – The first round of Legislative elections is held.
- 15 June – The all-new Renault Twingo goes on sale in France as well as Italy, Slovenia and the rest of Europe. The old Twingo is set to cease production on 28 June.
- 17 June – The second round of Legislative elections is held.

=== July – September ===
- 15 July – Vélib' bicycle-sharing system introduced in Paris.

=== October – December ===
- 24–25 October – Grenelle de l'Environnement Conferences.
- 30 October – 2007 Zoé's Ark controversy: Six members of charity organization Zoé's Ark are formally charged by the government of Chad for child abduction.
- 2 November: In Strasbourg the Tomi Ungerer Museum opens.
- 25 November – Riots continue for a second night in Val-d'Oise, following the death of two youths in a motorcycle collision with a police vehicle.
- 6 December – A pipe bomb explodes in a law office in Paris, killing one person.
- 26 December – Six members of the Zoé's Ark group are convicted and sentenced to eight years of forced labour, although they will be able to serve the time in France.

=== Full date unknown ===
- Association Pesinet, French NGO is founded.

== Sport ==
- 1 July – French Grand Prix won by Kimi Räikkönen of Finland.

== Deaths ==
=== January ===
- 9 January – Jean-Pierre Vernant, historian and anthropologist (born 1914).
- 11 January – Solveig Dommartin, actress (born 1961).
- 13 January – Henri-Jean Martin, historian of the book and printing (born 1924).
- 15 January – Colette Caillat, professor of Sanskrit and comparative grammar (born 1921).
- 20 January – Éric Aubijoux, motorcycle racer (born 1964).
- 22 January – Abbé Pierre, priest and founder of Emmaus movement (born 1912).
- 24 January – Jean-François Deniau, statesman, diplomat, essayist and novelist (born 1928).
- 26 January – Charles Brunier, convicted murderer and veteran of the First and Second World Wars who claimed to have been the inspiration for Papillon (born 1901).
- 26 January – Jean Ichbiah, computer scientist (born 1940).
- 27 January – Philippe Lacoue-Labarthe, philosopher, literary critic, and translator (born 1940).

=== February ===
- 2 February – Gisèle Pascal, actress (born 1921).
- 5 February – Liliane Ackermann, community leader, writer, and lecturer (born 1938).
- 17 February – Jean Duvignaud, novelist and sociologist (born 1921).
- 17 February – Maurice Papon, Vichy government official, prefect of police of Paris (born 1910).

=== March ===
- 1 March – Colette Brosset, actress, writer and choreographer (born 1922).
- 2 March – Henri Troyat, author, biographer, historian and novelist (born 1911).
- 6 March – Jean Baudrillard, philosopher and sociologist (born 1929).
- 6 March – Pierre Moinot, novelist (born 1920).
- 13 March – Nicole Stéphane, actress, producer and director (born 1923).
- 14 March – Lucie Aubrac, World War II Resistance fighter (born 1912).
- 14 March – Roger Beaufrand, Olympic gold medal winning cyclist (born 1908).
- 15 March – Jean Talairach, neurosurgeon (born 1911).

=== April ===
- 9 April – Alain Etchegoyen, philosopher and novelist (born 1951).
- 11 April – Loïc Leferme, free diver (born 1970).
- 12 April – Pierre Probst, cartoonist (born 1913).
- 14 April – René Rémond, historian and political economist (born 1918).
- 17 April – Raymond Kaelbel, international soccer player (born 1932).
- 19 April – Jean-Pierre Cassel, actor (born 1932).
- 30 April – Grégory Lemarchal, singer (born 1983).

=== May ===
- 18 May – Pierre-Gilles de Gennes, physicist and the Nobel Prize laureate in Physics in 1991 (born 1932).
- 30 May – Jean-Claude Brialy, actor and director (born 1933).
- 30 May – Emmanuel Hostache, bobsledder (born 1975).

=== June ===
- 12 June – Guy de Rothschild, banker (born 1909).
- 26 June – Lucien Hervé, photographer (born 1910).

=== July ===
- 3 July – Claude Pompidou, philanthropist, wife of President of France Georges Pompidou (born 1912).
- 5 July – Régine Crespin, opera singer (born 1927).
- 22 July – Jean Stablinski, racing cyclist (born 1932).
- 29 July – Michel Serrault, actor (born 1928).
- July – François Bruhat, mathematician (born 1929).

=== August ===
- 5 August – Henri Amouroux, historian and journalist (born 1920).
- 5 August – Jean-Marie Lustiger, Roman Catholic Archbishop of Paris and Cardinal (born 1926).
- 5 August – Janine Niépce, photographer (born 1921).
- 6 August – Élie de Rothschild, banker (born 1917).
- 10 August – Jean Rédélé, automotive pioneer, pilot and founder of automotive brand Alpine (born 1922).
- 11 August – Maurice Boitel, painter (born 1919).
- 21 August – Caroline Aigle, first woman fighter pilot in the French Air Force (born 1974).
- 25 August – Raymond Barre, politician and economist, Prime Minister (born 1924).
- 29 August – Pierre Messmer, Gaullist politician and Prime Minister (born 1916).

=== September ===
- 8 September – Jean-François Bizot, journalist and writer (born 1944).
- 14 September – Jacques Martin, television presenter and producer (born 1933).
- 15 September – Marie-Simone Capony, teacher, fifth-oldest person in the world (born 1894).
- 19 September – Maia Simon, actress (born 1939).
- 22 September – André Gorz, journalist and social philosopher (born 1923).
- 22 September – Marcel Marceau, mime artist (born 1923).
- 28 September – René Desmaison, mountaineer, climber and alpinist (born 1930).

=== October ===
- 1 October – Bernard Delaire, last French naval veteran of the First World War (born 1899).
- 5 October – Alexandra Boulat, photographer (born 1962).
- 13 October – Bob Denard, mercenary (born 1929).
- 14 October – Raymond Pellegrin, actor (born 1925).
- 22 October – Ève Curie, author and writer, daughter of Marie and Pierre Curie (born 1904).
- 24 October – Jules Bigot, soccer player and manager (born 1915).
- 29 October – Christian d'Oriola, Olympic gold medal winning foil fencer (born 1928).

=== November ===
- 3 November – Maurice Noël Léon Couve de Murville, Roman Catholic Archbishop of Birmingham (born 1929).
- 16 November – Pierre Granier-Deferre, film director (born 1927).
- 19 November – André Bettencourt, Resistance fighter, politician and Minister (born 1919).
- 22 November – Maurice Béjart, choreographer who ran the Béjart Ballet Lausanne (born 1927).
- 28 November – Fred Chichin, musician and songwriter (born 1954).
- 30 November – François-Xavier Ortoli, politician, businessman, Minister and President of the European Commission (born 1925).

=== December ===
- 13 December – Philippe Clay, mime artist, singer and actor (born 1927).
- 13 December – Alain Payet, adult film director (born 1947).
- 15 December – Jean Bottéro, historian (born 1914).
- 16 December – Serge Vinçon, politician (born 1949).
- 22 December – Julien Gracq, writer (born 1910).
- 22 December – Lucien Teisseire, road bicycle racer (born 1919).
