= Charles Lee Tilden =

American attorney and businessman (1857–1950)

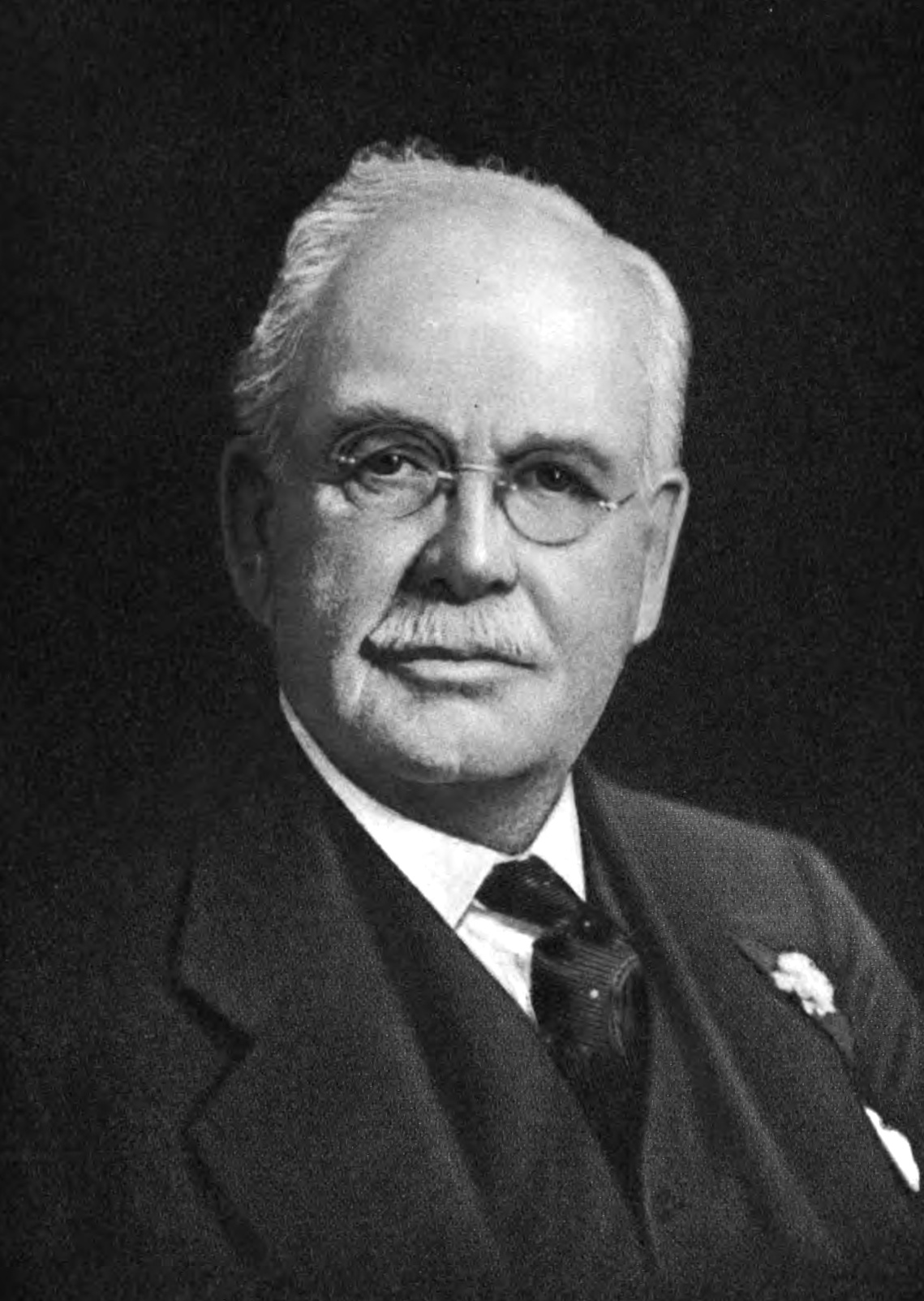
- Tilden, c. 1950s
- Born: July 17, 1857; Chile Gulch, California, United States
- Died: November 12, 1950 (aged 93); Alameda, California, United States
- Burial place: Mountain View Cemetery
- Education: Lowell High School; University of California, Berkeley; Hastings College of Law
- Children: Charles Lee Tilden, Jr.

Charles Lee Tilden (July 17, 1857 – November 12, 1950) was an attorney and businessman in the San Francisco Bay Area who served on the first Board of Directors of the East Bay Regional Park District. One of the first three parks in the District was named for him: Tilden Regional Park.

== Biography ==
Tilden was born in the Sierra foothills town of Chile Gulch, Calaveras County on July 17, 1857, to Harmon J. Tilden and Mary Jane Lee. His father was a judge. The Tildens moved to San Francisco in 1865.

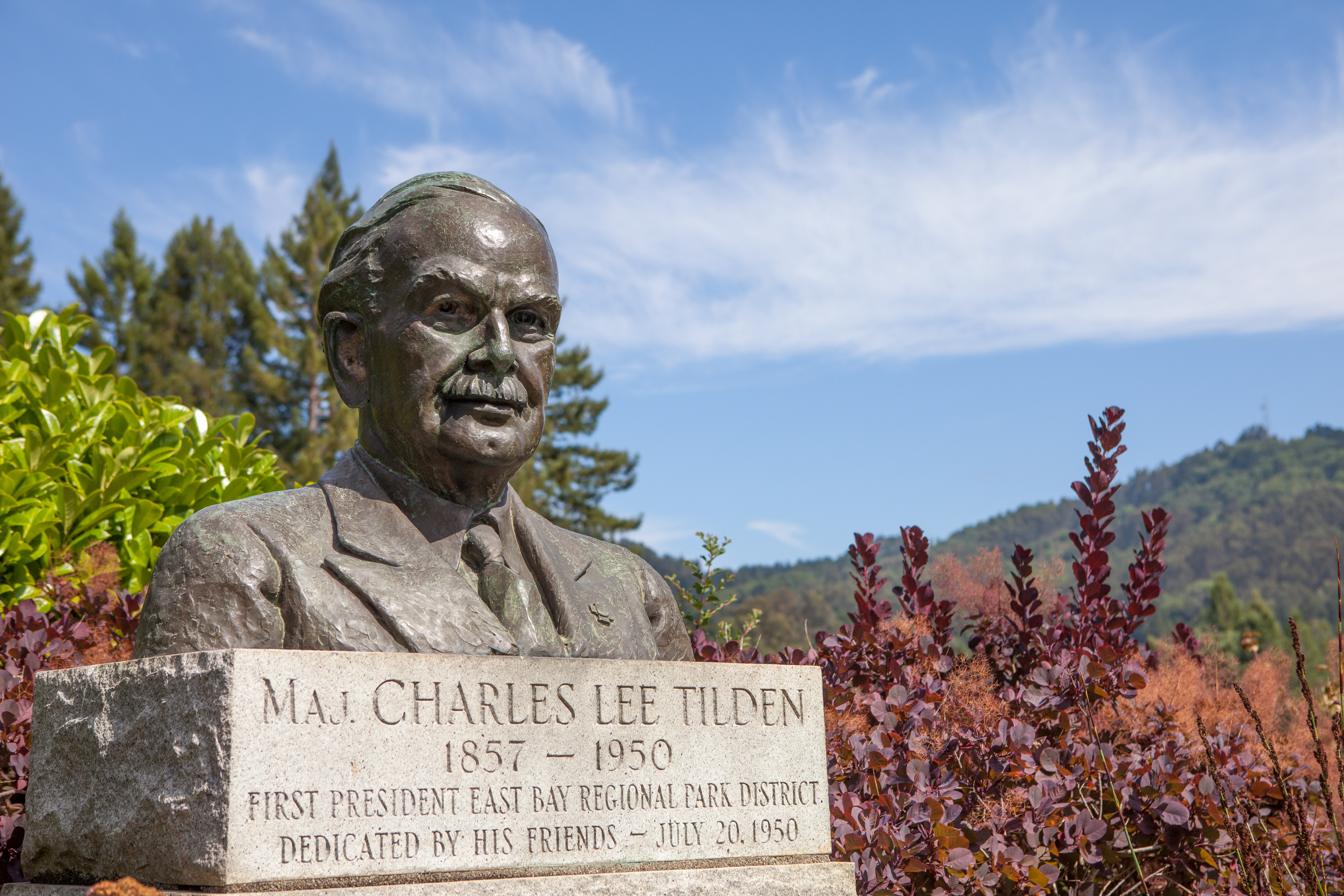
Bust of Charles Lee Tilden outside the Brazilian Room in Tilden Park

Tilden graduated from Lowell High School in 1874 and from the University of California, Berkeley in 1878. He received his law degree from Hastings College of Law in 1881. While attending the University of California, he joined a campus unit which was eventually incorporated into the California National Guard. He was also a founding brother of the University of California, Berkeley’s Delta Kappa Epsilon Fraternity, Theta Zeta chapter, and helped the chapter move into their first permanent house at 2330 Telegraph Avenue in 1897; he would later transfer ownership to the California Alumni of DKE in 1909. His affiliation with the National Guard continued through the Spanish–American War, in which he participated. He left the Guard with the rank of major and was often addressed as "Major Tilden" for the remainder of his life.

In the 1930s, Tilden led the effort to create a system of regional parks in the East Bay, and served as the first President of the East Bay Regional Park District Board of Directors. He was also a Mills College Trustee. Tilden died at age 93 on November 12, 1950 in Alameda, and was buried at the Mountain View Cemetery in Oakland.

== Personal life ==
Tilden married Lilly Mitchell (nee Von Schmidt; October 12, 1859 – November 8, 1946) on June 9, 1892. The Tildens resided in Alameda. Tilden Way at the southeast end of Alameda is named for him.

Tilden's son, Charles Lee Tilden, Jr. was a member of the United States Olympic rugby team in 1920 at Antwerp and 1924 at Paris, winning the gold medal in both Olympiads. Mrs. Tilden had two daughters from her previous marriage.
