= Labeyrie =

Labeyrie may refer to:

- Labeyrie, Pyrénées-Atlantiques, a commune in France

== People with the surname ==
- Antoine Émile Henry Labeyrie, French astronomer
- Louis Labeyrie, French basketball player
- Maurice Labeyrie, French rugby union player
