= Heaton Wrenn =

American rugby union player (1900–1978)

Medal record

Men's rugby union

Representing the United States

Olympic Games
Gold medal – first place	1920 Antwerp	Team competition

Heaton Luse Wrenn (January 18, 1900 – January 16, 1978) was an American rugby union player who competed in the 1920 Summer Olympics. He was a member of the American rugby union team, which won the gold medal in the 1920 Summer Olympics.
