= Robert Levasseur (rugby union) =

French rugby union player

Olympic medal record

Men's Rugby union
Silver medal – second place	1920 Antwerp	Team

Robert Levasseur (27 January 1898 in Paris – 25 May 1974) was a French rugby union player who competed in the 1920 Summer Olympics. In 1920, he won the silver medal as a member of the French team.
