= Raoul Thiercelin =

French rugby union player

Personal information
- Born: 12 March 1898
- Died: 1 May 1988 (aged 90)

Sport
- Sport: Rugby union
Medal record
Men's rugby union
Representing France
Olympic Games
Silver medal – second place	1920 Antwerp	Team

Raoul Thiercelin (12 March 1898 – 1 May 1988) was a French rugby union player. He was part of the French team that won the silver medal in the rugby tournament at the 1920 Summer Olympics.

== See also ==
- List of Olympic medalists in rugby
