= Alfred Eluère =

French rugby union player

Olympic medal record

Men's Rugby union
Silver medal – second place	1920 Antwerp	Team

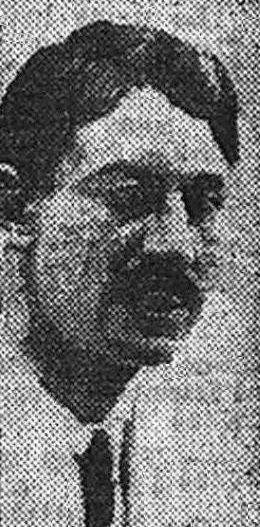
Alfred Eluère

Alfred Eluère (28 July 1893 – 12 March 1985) was a French rugby union player who competed in the 1920 Summer Olympics. In 1920, he won the silver medal as a member of the French team.

== Honors and awards ==
- Commander of the Order of Legion of Honour (1949)
- Croix de Guerre 1914-1918
- Olympic medal (Silver - 1920)
