= James Fitzpatrick (rugby union) =

American rugby union player

Olympic medal record

Men's rugby union

Representing the United States
Gold medal – first place	1920 Antwerp	Team competition

James Peter Fitzpatrick (June 2, 1892 – October 9, 1973) was an American rugby union player who competed in the 1920 Summer Olympics.

He was a member of the American rugby union team, which won the gold medal. Attended Santa Clara University for undergrad and Stanford University for his law degree. His gold medals are currently displayed at Santa Clara University's De Saisset Museum.
