= John Muldoon (rugby union, born 1896) =

American rugby union player

Medal record

Men's rugby

Representing the United States

Olympic Games
| Gold medal – first place | 1920 Antwerp | Team competition |

John Muldoon (March 2, 1896 – January 2, 1944) was an American rugby union player who competed in the 1920 Summer Olympics. He was a member of the American rugby union team, which won the gold medal.
