= Jerry Reitman =

American author and businessman (1938–2024)

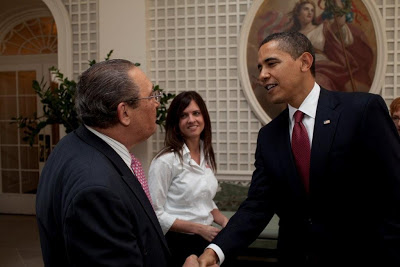
- Reitman with President Barack Obama in 2009
- Born: January 9, 1938; Philadelphia, Pennsylvania, U.S.
- Died: November 5, 2024 (aged 86)
- Education: Pennsylvania State University (BS)
- Occupations: Author; Businessman; Advertising executive

Jerry Reitman (January 9, 1938 – November 5, 2024) was an American author, businessman and advertising executive. Reitman was the founder of the Reitman Group. He also worked for American Express, serving as the vice president of marketing for the CBS Columbia House division, as the CEO of Scali, McCabe, Sloves, the International Head and Executive Vice President of Ogilvy, and the Executive Vice President of Leo Burnett Worldwide.

== Early life ==
Reitman was born on January 9, 1938 to Benjamin and Ruth Reitman. He grew up in a Jewish family in Philadelphia, Pennsylvania. His father was the owner of multiple shoe retail stores. He graduated from Abraham Lincoln High School and went on to attend Penn State where he graduated with a degree in finance.

== Career ==
Reitman started his career at Ziff Davis as an ad salesman. While at Ziff Davis, he went on to become the director of their British Magazine of the Month Club. He then spent time working at Publishers Clearing House and Academic Media Company.

In 1974, Reitman became the International Head and Executive Vice President of Ogilvy and was successful in growing Oglivy from two offices to 26 offices over a four-year period. In 1982, Reitman was named the president and CEO of Scali, McCabe, Sloves where he was tasked with expanding the company. In 1985, Reitman became the Executive Vice President of Leo Burnett Worldwide. He retired from Leo Burnett after working there for 15 years.

Reitman published Beyond 2000: The Future of Direct Marketing in 2000. The book talks about the future of the direct marketing industry.

== Personal life and death ==
Reitman was a resident of Chicago, Illinois. He also owned homes in Venice, California and Stockholm, Sweden. His nephew is professional tennis player Oskar Wikberg. He died November 5, 2024, at the age of 86.

== Charitable work ==
Reitman served as the chairman of the board of Governors at the Children's Miracle Network Hospitals for more than 20 years. As a result of his work with the Children's Miracle Network, he was invited to the White House in 2009 and met with President Barack Obama.

=== Awards ===
The city of New Orleans, Louisiana gifted him with the key to the city. Other awards he has received include the Direct Marketers Silver Apple, the Charles S. Downs Award and the Direct Marketer of Year Award.
