= John Patrick (rugby union) =

American rugby union player

Jack Patrick
- John Patrick at the 1920 Olympic Games
- Born: November 25, 1898; Palo Alto, California, US
- Died: May 31, 1959 (aged 60); San Francisco, California
- Education: Stanford University

Jack Patrick
Medal record

Men's rugby union

Representing the United States

Olympic Games
Gold medal – first place	1920 Antwerp	Team competition
Gold medal – first place	1924 Paris	Team competition

Jack Patrick, unique rugby match of the 1920' olympic games (Anvers).jpg

John Clarence Patrick (November 25, 1898 – May 31, 1959) was an American rugby union player. He competed with the American rugby union team in the 1920 Summer Olympics and 1924 Summer Olympics, winning gold both times.

== Early life and education ==
Patrick was born on November 25, 1898, in Palo Alto, California. Friends and family called him Jack. He attended Stanford University for four years, playing fullback on the football team for his last three years. He graduated in 1921. Patrick was class president and football team captain in his senior year.

== Olympics ==
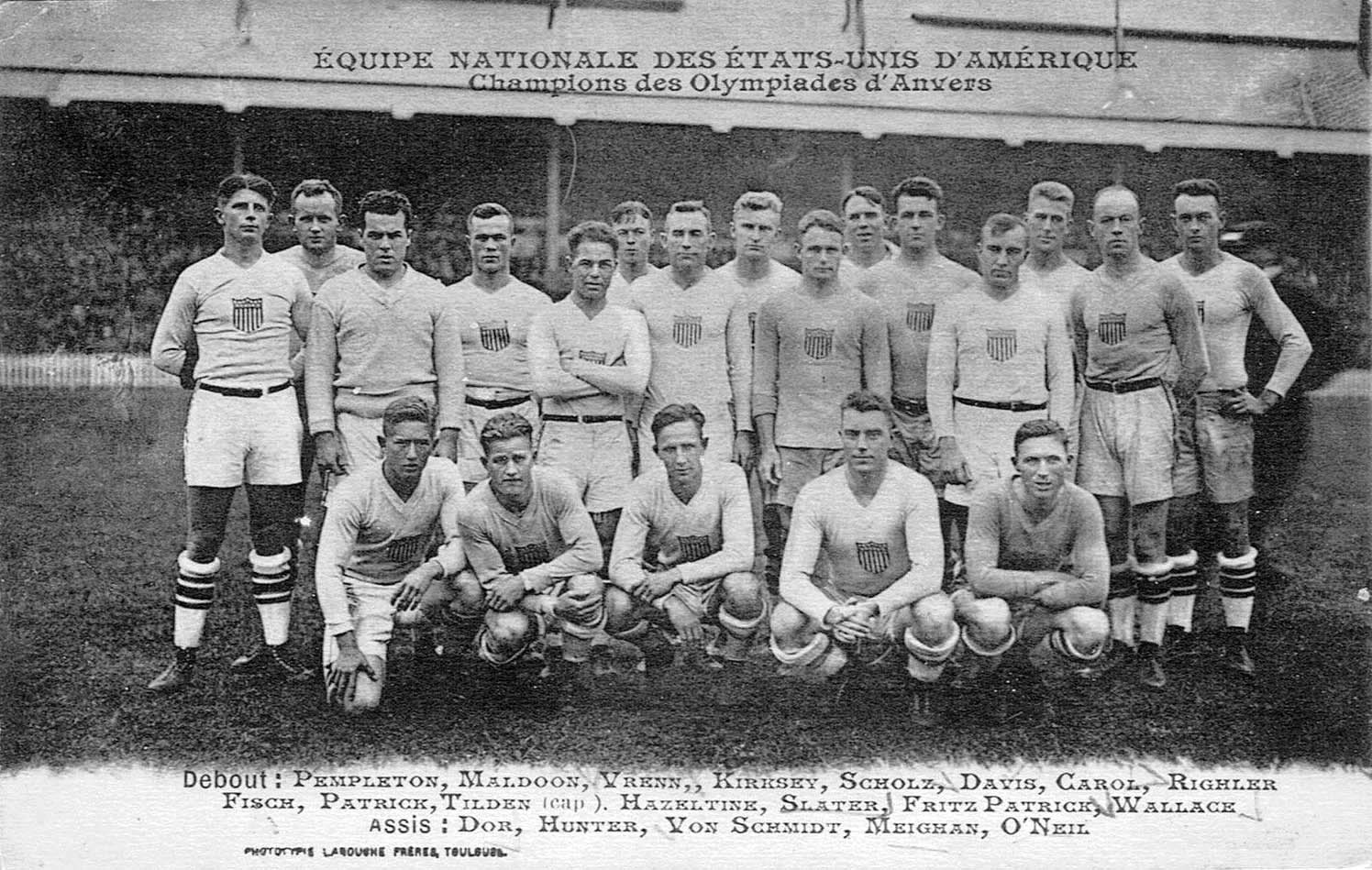
1920 American Olympic rugby team. Patrick is in the back row, fifth from the right.

Rugby was not a popular sport at the time of the 1920 Olympics. California was the only US state in which it was played competitively, meaning the entire American Olympic rugby team was made up of college students from California. Patrick was one of the Californian students recruited for this team, and competed in the Olympics under the name “Jack Patrick”.

By the time Patrick reached Europe, Czechoslovakia and Romania had withdrawn their rugby teams from the competition. This left only the teams from the United States and France to compete. France was the favored team going into the game and expected an easy win. The United States, however, won the match (and thus the gold) 8–0.

When the 1924 Olympics arrived, rugby was no more popular than it was in 1920. Patrick and a few others from the 1920 team still managed to pull together a full team for 1924, however. Much of this 1924 team was made up of football players who had never played rugby before. It was, again, a heavily Californian group.

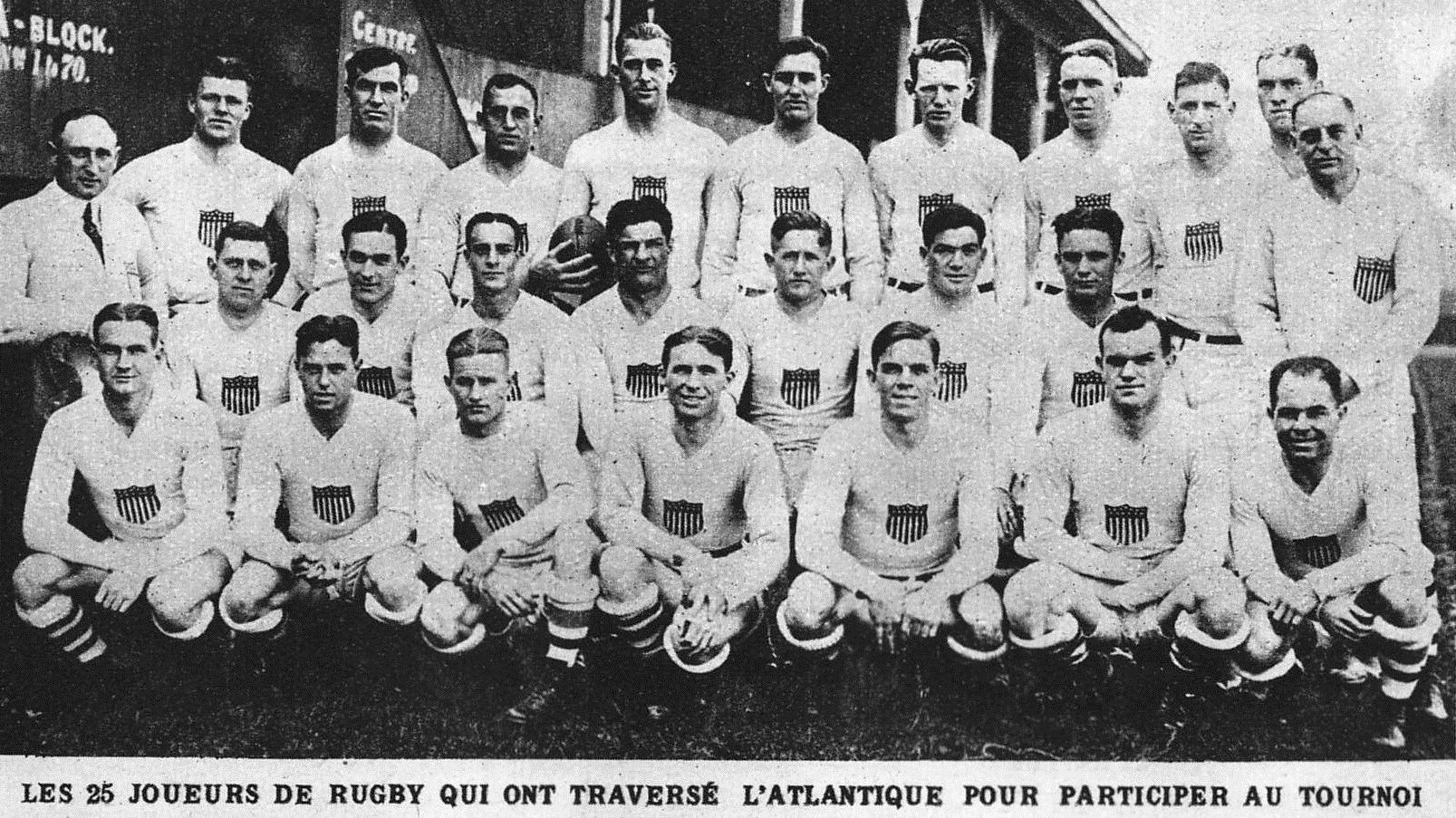
1924 American Olympic rugby team.

This year, three countries sent rugby union teams to the Olympics: Romania, France, and the US. Each team played two matches. The American team beat the Romanians 39–0 on May 11. They then went on to face the French, who had also won their match against Romania. Made up of mostly American football players, the American team was used to heavy tackling, which exhausted their opponents. As a result, the Americans beat France 17–3 at the Stade Colombes on May 18, winning the first gold medal of the 1924 Olympics. Rugby was removed from the Olympics soon afterwards.

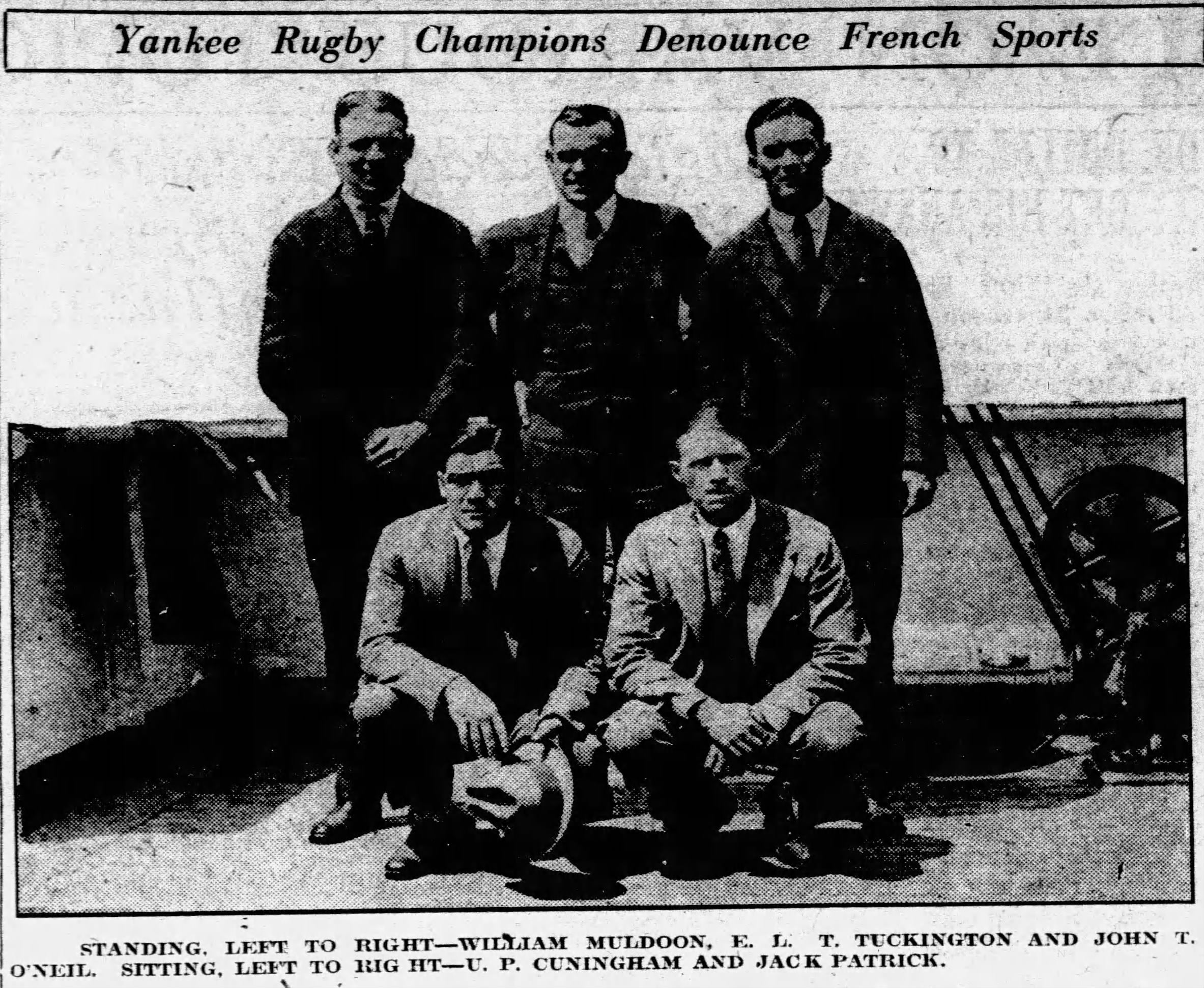
Patrick and teammates from the 1924 Olympics.

== Post-athletic career ==
After his athletic career, Patrick became an insurance broker in San Francisco. He was vice president of Insurance Securities Factors, Inc.

Patrick died in San Francisco on May 31, 1959 at the age of 60.
