= Charles Lee Tilden Jr. =

American rugby union player

Medal record

Men's rugby union

Representing the United States

Olympic Games
Gold medal – first place	1920 Antwerp	Team

Charles Lee Tilden Jr., (June 4, 1894 – November 1, 1968) was an American rugby union player who competed in the 1920 Summer Olympics. In 1920, he won the gold medal as a member of the American rugby union team.

Four years later, he was a reserve player in the American Olympic rugby union team, but did not play.

He was a resident of Piedmont, California.

== See also ==
- Charles Lee Tilden (father)
