= George Fish =

American rugby union player

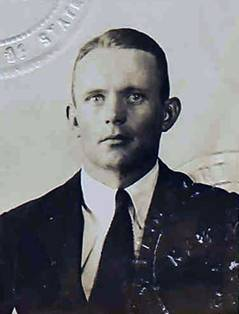
- George Fish in 1920

Personal information
- Born: April 4, 1895 Los Angeles, California
- Died: February 22, 1977 (aged 81)
- Height: 173 cm (5 ft 8 in)

Sport
- Country: United States
- Sport: Rugby union
Medal record
Men's rugby union
Representing the United States
Gold medal – first place	1920 Antwerp	Team competition

George Winthrop "Dixie" Fish (April 4, 1895 – February 22, 1977) was an American rugby union player who competed in the 1920 Summer Olympics. Fish was a graduate of Cal/Berkeley and Columbia Medical School, later became a noted urologist, and supervised several professional organizations. Fish was a member of the American rugby union team, which won the gold medal at the Olympic Games.
