= Chili Gulch =

Historic site in Calaveras County, California, US

- Interactive map of Chili Gulch
- 38.216029°N 120.707433°W
- Location: California State Route 49, south of Mokelumne Hill, California

California Historical Landmark
- Reference no.: 265

Chili Gulch (also spelled Chile Gulch) is a gulch in Calaveras County, California. This five-mile gulch was the richest placer mining section in Calaveras County. It received its name from Chileans who worked it in 1848 and 1849, and was the scene of the so-called Chilean War. The largest known quartz crystals were recovered from a mine on the south side of the gulch.

Chili Gulch is registered as California Historical Landmark #265.

== Chilean War ==
In December 1848, American miners in Calaveras County drew up a local mining code that called for all foreign miners to leave the country within 15 days, leading to much protest and violence. The so-called "Chilean War" resulted in several deaths and the expulsion of Chilean miners from their claims. Accounts vary widely about the details, at least 2 men were killed in shootouts and others wounded. A trial at Mokelumne Hill found three Chileans guilty of murder and sentenced to death, five received 50 lashes and head shavings and three received 30 lashes and had their ears cropped.

Some sources include mention of Joaquin Murrieta's involvement on the side of the Chileans. The events in Calaveras County projected the Murietta legend into the politics of Chile where anti-American politicians used it to garner votes.
