= Oskar Wikberg =

Swedish tennis player (born 1993)

- Country (sports): Sweden
- Born: 20 September 1993 (age 31)
- Plays: Right-handed

Singles
- Career titles: 1 ITF

Oskar Wikberg (born August 20, 1993) is a Swedish tennis player.

== Career ==
Wikberg was a talented youth player. He had a constant presence in the Swedish juniors top-10. He won the Swedish National Championships in singles U-18.

Wikberg played college tennis at the University of Wisconsin and later transferred to UC Berkeley. He compiled a college record of 82 wins and 46 losses.

Wikberg has one ITF title which he won in Vietnam. He has reached the quarterfinals in two ITF 10,000 Futures tournaments.

== Personal life ==
Wikberg is from Täby, Sweden. His sister, Hanna, is also a professional tennis player, who played college tennis at Penn State. His uncle is American advertising executive Jerry Reitman.
