= 2007 Zoé's Ark controversy =

Incident by a French charity organization

The 2007 Zoé's Ark controversy started when members of a French charity organization, the Zoé's Ark (French: L'Arche de Zoé), attempted to fly 103 children out of Chad to France. The members of the charity were charged and eventually convicted of child abduction.

== Events and trial ==
On 30 October 2007, six members of the charity organization Zoé's Ark were formally charged by the government of Chad for child abduction. Despite the group's claim that the children were orphans from Darfur who were being taken to be fostered in France, most of the 103 children were found to be Chadian, and to have had at least one living parent or guardian. Three journalists, seven Spanish Girjet flight crew members, four Chadian and Sudanese nationals, including two Chadian officials, were also charged for complicity.

Allegedly, some parents were convinced to give up their infants for promises of schooling, but had been told that the schooling would occur in Chad rather than France, while some children were offered sweets and biscuits to leave home. These claims were denied by the aid workers.

The incident strained Franco-Chadian relations, ahead of a planned deployment of French peacekeeping troops into the country. Anti-French protests were staged within Chad.

Over the course of the trial, all six aid workers participated in a hunger strike. Possibly as a result, one of the accused fainted in court and required hospitalization. The six were protesting at what they perceived as abandonment by French authorities.

French president Nicolas Sarkozy successfully negotiated the dropping of charges and release of the journalists and flight crew members prior to trial. Six members of the group were convicted on 26 December 2007 and sentenced to eight years of forced labor, although they, ultimately, were instead incarcerated for five months in France, which has no forced labor in its penal system, under an accord between Chad and France. The six were released in March 2008 but were ordered to pay each of the 103 victims restitution equal to approximately $87,000, which amounts to $8.9M per defendant. A Chadian national and a Sudanese national were each also sentenced to four years. The two Chadian officials were acquitted. In March 2008 the president of Chad pardoned the convicted aid-workers, and they were released from the prisons in France.
