= René Crabos =

France international rugby union player

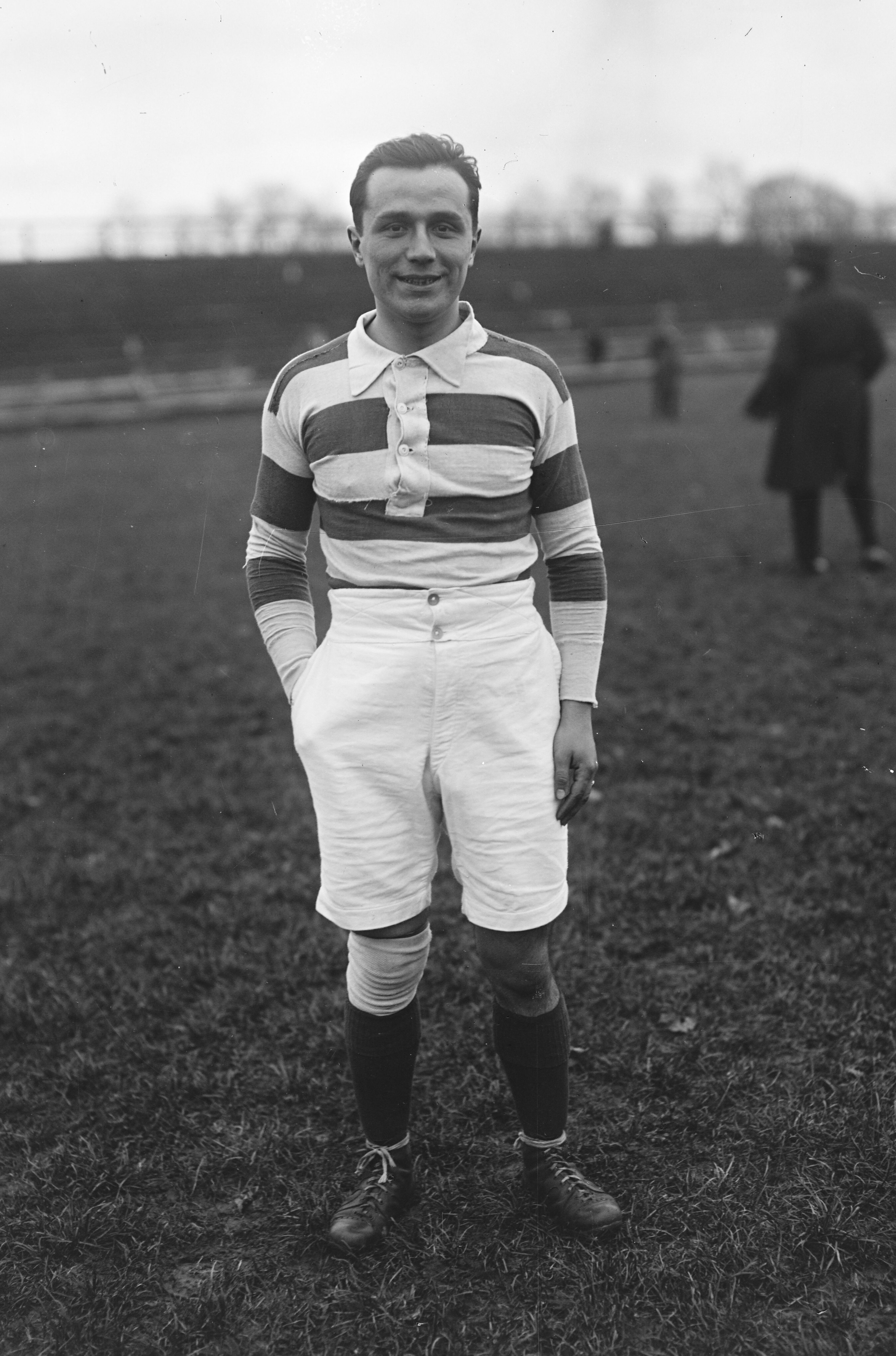
- René Crabos on 1 January 1922 at the Stade Colombes
- Born: René Crabos; 7 February 1899 Saint-Sever, Landes
- Died: 17 June 1964 (aged 65) Saint-Sever, Landes
- Height: 5 ft 6 in (168 cm)
- Weight: 150 lb (68 kg)

Rugby union career
Senior career
Years	Team	Apps	(Points)
????	US Saint-Sever		
????	US Dax		
????	Stadoceste Tarbais		
????	Racing club de France		
International career
Years	Team	Apps	(Points)
1920 – 1924	France	17	(19)
Medal record
Men's rugby union
Representing France
Olympic Games
Silver medal – second place	1920 Antwerp	Team

René Crabos (7 February 1899 – 17 June 1964) was a French rugby union player and administrator who represented the France national team 17 times between 1920 and 1924, and went on to be president of the Fédération Française de Rugby between 1952 and 1962, as well as president of the Fédération Internationale de Rugby Amateur (FIRA) (Now known as Rugby Europe) from 1954 to 1962. Crabos represented France at rugby in the 1920 Summer Olympics, the team won the silver medal.

The Under 18s French rugby union championship is named in his honour.

He was born in Saint-Sever and died in Saint-Sever.
