= Association Pesinet =

Association Pesinet is a French NGO, founded in late 2007, that leverages ICT and mobile agents to improve detection and early treatment of childhood diseases in Mali. The service combines frequent monitoring of simple health indicators with an affordable insurance system and education on preventive health practices.

== History ==
Pesinet was founded in 2007 and launched activities in Mali in 2009, after a formal agreement was signed between Pesinet and Mali’s Health Ministry for the implementation and evaluation of the pilot site.

The first program was launched in January 2010 during an official ceremony attended by the Health Minister. It covers the neighbourhoods of Bamako Coura and Bamako Coura Bolibana.

In 2011, and at the request of the two community health centers in Dravela and Ouolofobougou, two neighboring districts of Bamako Coura, Pesinet began to work on the extension of its activities in these two areas. The launch of the two new programs was made official during a ceremony that took place in October 2011, during which the partnership agreement with the community health centers was officially signed.

== Mission and Founding Principles ==
The mission of Association Pesinet is to sustainably reduce infant and child mortality by facilitating access of populations to existing healthcare systems. In partnership with local health centers, Pesinet designs and deploys home-based health monitoring services for children and mothers.

Pesinet’s action is motivated by the following facts:

- In Mali, the under-5 mortality rate is 178 per 1000, meaning nearly 1 in 5 children does not reach the age of 5;
- More than 59% of deaths among young children are due to complications of minor illnesses such as diarrhea, malaria, and pneumonia;
- Yet these illnesses are easily detectable and can be treated with the medical means available locally in primary health structures called Community Health Centers (in French, les Centres de Santé Communautaires or CSCOMs);
- For cultural, geographical, or financial reasons, families do not go to the doctor at the first sign of symptoms. In Mali, people visit a health structure on average 0.24 times per year. Simple illnesses are therefore not detected or treated in time, leading to costly emergency medical treatment and unnecessary fatalities; meanwhile the underused CSCOMs experience financial difficulties.

The founding principles of the organization are:

- Work in close partnership with the local healthcare structures and the health authorities in Mali in order to integrate into and reinforce the public health system;
- Encourage prevention and rebuild the link between the population and the healthcare system;
- Use technology to facilitate monitoring of a large number of children; rapid disease detection and early care;
- Ask for a financial contribution from the beneficiaries in order to ensure the economic viability of the service and adhere to national policies governing the financing of the healthcare system.

== How the service works ==
The service is based on the voluntary enrollment of families and costs 500 FCFA/child per month, or less than 1 euro. For this price, families are entitled to regular home visit by the health agents as well as free doctor consultations and 50% reduction on medications. Pesinet agents visit families several times each month to examine children, collect key data (weight, cough, fever, diarrhea…) and enter it in an application on a mobile phone. The data collected by the agents is transmitted in real time to a database accessible by the doctors at the closest health center. Doctors at the health center read that data and summon children at risk through the responsible health agent. A survey of families enrolled in the program found that 94% of subscribers were satisfied with the service and 97% of them found it affordable.

== Awards and recognition ==
- Pesinet won in May 2011 the Convergences 2015 Award for its partnership with the Health Ministry and primary health structures in Mali;
- Pesinet was referenced in the report from Monitor Group « Promises and Progress: market-based solutions to poverty in Africa;
- Pesinet was a winner in the competition Top 11 Innovators 2011, organized by the mHealth Alliance and the Rockefeller Foundation, recognizing individual pioneers in the use of mobile technology for the betterment of healthcare systems and the health of populations.
- Pesinet joined the Ashoka network in 2010;
- Pesinet was referenced in the 2008 and 2010 reports of the « Growing Inclusive Markets» initiative led by the United Nations Development Program on entrepreneurial models in line with the Millennium Development Goals;
- Pesinet was a finalist in the international Global Social Venture Competition at Berkeley in 2009.
