= Rugby union at the 1920 Summer Olympics =

Men's rugby union at the Games of the VII Olympiad
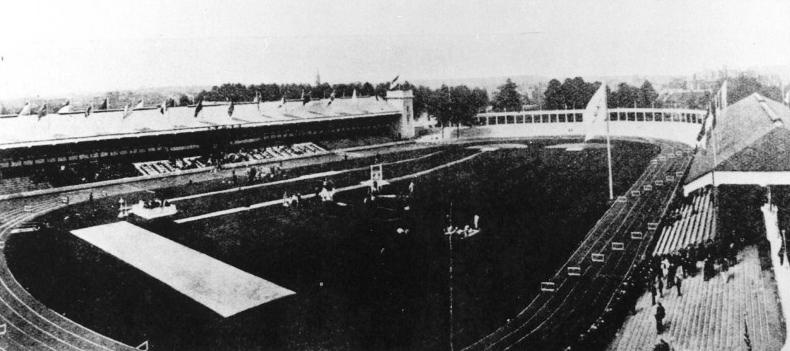
- Venue: Olympic Stadium
- Date: September 5
- Competitors: 33 from 2 nations

Medalists
1st place, gold medalist(s)		United States
2nd place, silver medalist(s)		France

Rugby union at the 1920 Summer Olympics was played in Antwerp, Belgium. Two nations entered the rugby union event at the 1920 Summer Olympics — France and the United States. The French team were thought to be assured of the gold medal and came in as favourites in the event. However, the United States team surprised everyone when defeating France by eight points to nil.

== Summary ==
The rugby football Olympic tournament consisted of only one match. It was played between the United States and France. The US squad was made up of American football players from three California universities, Stanford, California, and Santa Clara. Due to American football becoming an increasingly violent sport, these and other West Coast universities chose to instead play rugby union from 1906–1914.

On the other side, the French team was composed of rugby players from four clubs near Paris: Racing Club, Olympique, CASG, and SCUF. This team is put together at the last minute with only 4 real international players, following the unexpected arrival of the American team and the withdrawal of other expected competitors Czechoslovakia and Romania. The British nations has announced long before the tournament that they wouldn't take part, the September schedule being too early for their teams to be competitive.

United States player Rudy Scholz wrote about the match:

It started at 5 PM, (time here for all big matches) and there was a crowd of about 20,000 present, despite the fact it was raining. At a council of war we decided that because the ground was wet and slippery and the ball likewise, we would make it a forward game. The French tried a backfield game, and they lost although they were fast. The slippery ball and field proved their undoing...

== Post-Olympic tour of France ==
After the Olympic competition, a tour of France is organized for Les Californiens by the Union des Sociétés Françaises de Sports Athlétiques (USFSA). This tour includes 4 matches, the last one being a test match against France.

On 19 September, in Lyon, United States defeated a team representing the southeast of France 26–0. The American team also achieved a 11-3 victory against Stade Toulousain in Toulouse on 26 September in front of a 15,000 crowd and a 6-3 victory against a southwest side at Bordeaux.

The Anvers rematch was played on 11 October at Stade de Colombes near Paris. United States was defeated by France 14–5, with 4 tries by Eugène Billac, François Borde, Raoul Got, and Adolphe Jauréguy, against one by Harold von Schmidt.

The US team again toured England and France in 1924, playing three games in England as preparation for the 1924 Olympic competition.

== Match details ==
United States	8–0	France XV
Try: Hunter; Con: Templeton; Pen: Templeton	Report

Olympic Stadium, Antwerp
Attendance: 55,000

Team details

USA	France

Dink Templeton	FB	15	FB	André Chilo
Charles Tilden (c)	W	14	W	Armand Grenet
Heaton Wrenn	C	13	C	François Borde
John Patrick	C	12	C	René Crabos (c)
Erwin Righter	W	11	W	Édouard Bader
Rudolph Scholz	FH	10	FH	Adolphe Bousquet
Charles Mehan	SH	9	SH	Raoul Thiercelin
George Fish	N8	8	N8	Robert Levasseur
Charles Doe	F	7	F	Alphonse Castex
Daniel Carroll	F	6	L	Alfred Eluère
Morris Kirksey	L	5	L	Jean Bruneval
Joseph Hunter	L	4	L	Maurice Labeyrie
James Fitzpatrick	H	3	P	Sélim Curtet
John O'Neil	H	2	H	Pierre Petiteau
John Muldoon	P	1	P	Jacques Forestier

== Medal summary ==
=== Medal table ===
Rank	Team	Matches	Points	Avg.	Tries	Avg tries
1st place, gold medalist(s)	United States	1	8	8	1	1
2nd place, silver medalist(s)	France XV	1	0	0	0	0
3rd place, bronze medalist(s)	(none awarded)					

=== Medalists ===
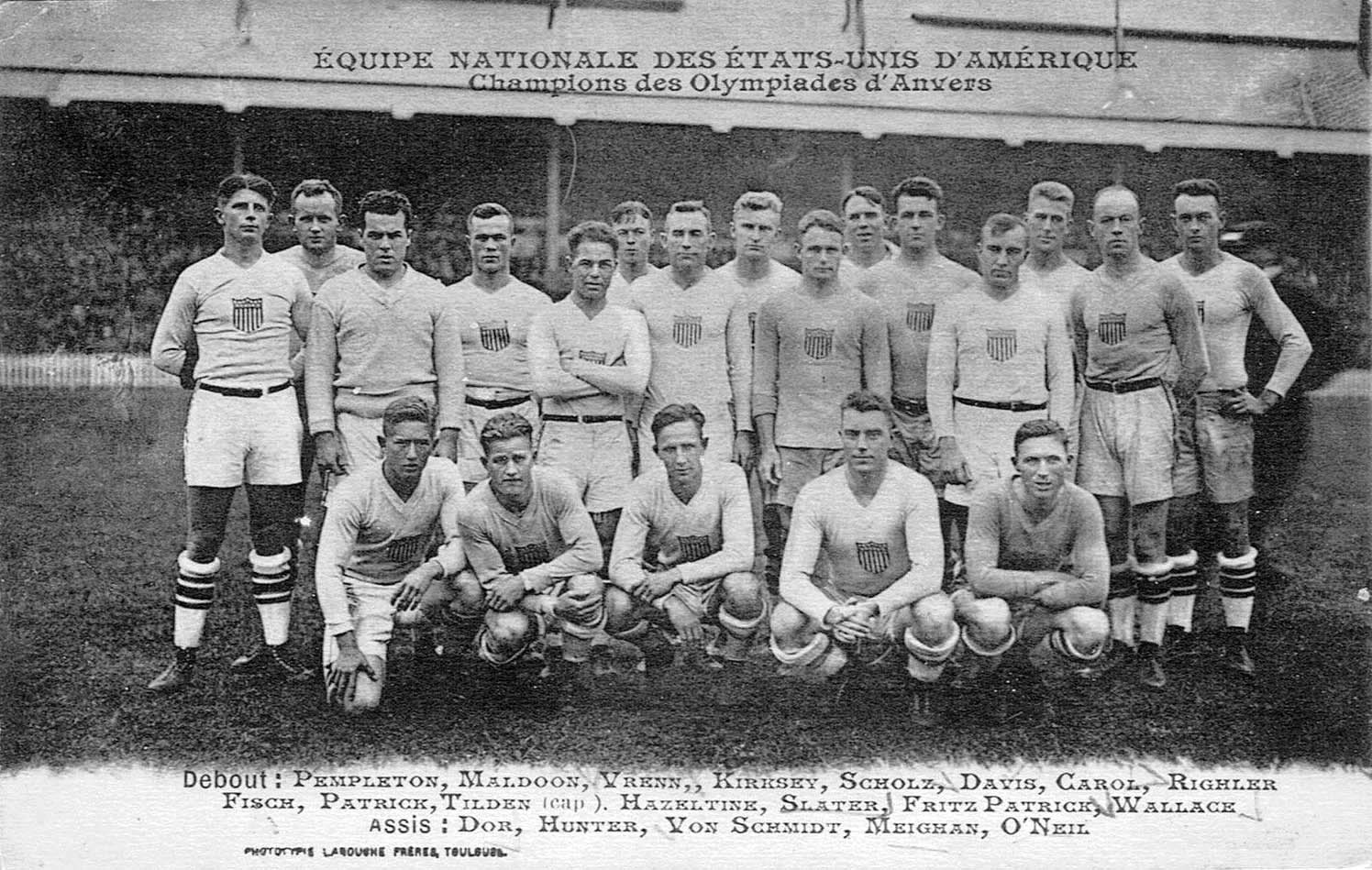
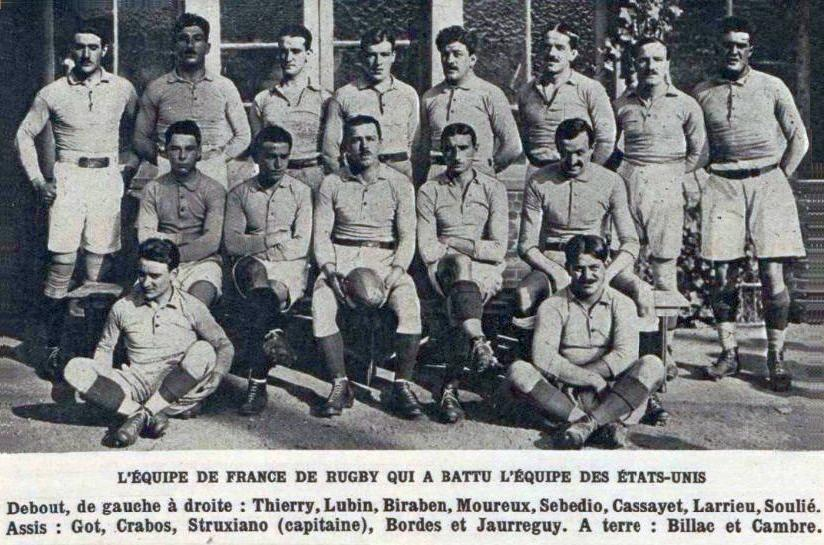
Above: United States, gold medal; below, France, which lost 8–0

Event	Gold	Silver	Bronze
Rugby union	United States Trainer/Selector: Harry Maloney; Player/Coach: Daniel Carroll; Charles Doe; George Fish; James Fitzpatrick; Joseph Hunter; Morris Kirksey; Charles Mehan; John Muldoon; John O'Neil; John Patrick; Erwin Righter; Rudolph Scholz; Dink Templeton; Charles Lee Tilden (capt); Heaton Wrenn; Harold Von Schmidt (did not play the game): Matthew E. Hazeltine, Sr. Colby Slater; James Winston	France Édouard Bader; François Borde; Adolphe Bousquet; Jean Bruneval; Alphonse Castex; André Chilo; René Crabos; Sélim Curtet; Alfred Eluère; Jacques Forestier; Armand Grenet; Maurice Labeyrie; Robert Levasseur; Pierre Petiteau; Raoul Thiercelin (did not play the game): Raymond Berrurier	none awarded

== Notes ==
Rugby Commissioner and President of the California Rugby Union, Harry Maloney, was coach and trainer of the team. He is also known for introducing and coaching rugby and soccer at Stanford University for many years.

- James Fitzpatrick, Matthew E. Hazeltine, Sr., and Harold Von Schmidt are missing in the IOC medal database but they did compete in the match. They are also visible on the team picture.
- James Winston is listed in the IOC medal database but he did not participate.
- Bill Muldoon and George Davis were also squad members of the American team but did not compete (and are not listed in the IOC medal database).
- Raymond Berrurier is listed in the IOC medal database but he did not participate.
- Constant Lamaignière, Eugène Soulié, and Robert Thierry were squad members for the French team but they did not play (and were not listed in the IOC medal database).
- Morris Kirksey also won gold for the United States in the 4x100 metre relay at these games.
