= Charles Mehan =

American rugby union player (1896–1972)

Medal record

Men's rugby union

Representing the United States

Olympic Games
| Gold medal – first place | 1920 Antwerp | Team competition |

Charles Thomas Mehan (May 15, 1896 – August 11, 1972) was an American rugby union player who competed in the 1920 Summer Olympics. He was born in Nogales, Arizona and died in Santa Cruz, California. In 1920, he was a member of the American rugby union team, which won the gold medal.
