= Bernard Delaire =

French naval veteran

- Born: 28 March 1899; Vendôme, France
- Died: 1 October 2007 (aged 108) Bénodet, Brittany, France
- Allegiance: (France) French Navy
- Service years: 1918–1920
- Other work: Professor

Bernard Delaire (28 March 1899 – 1 October 2007) was a French naval veteran of the First World War and one of the last six identified French veterans.
