= Alex Morgan =

American soccer player (born 1989)

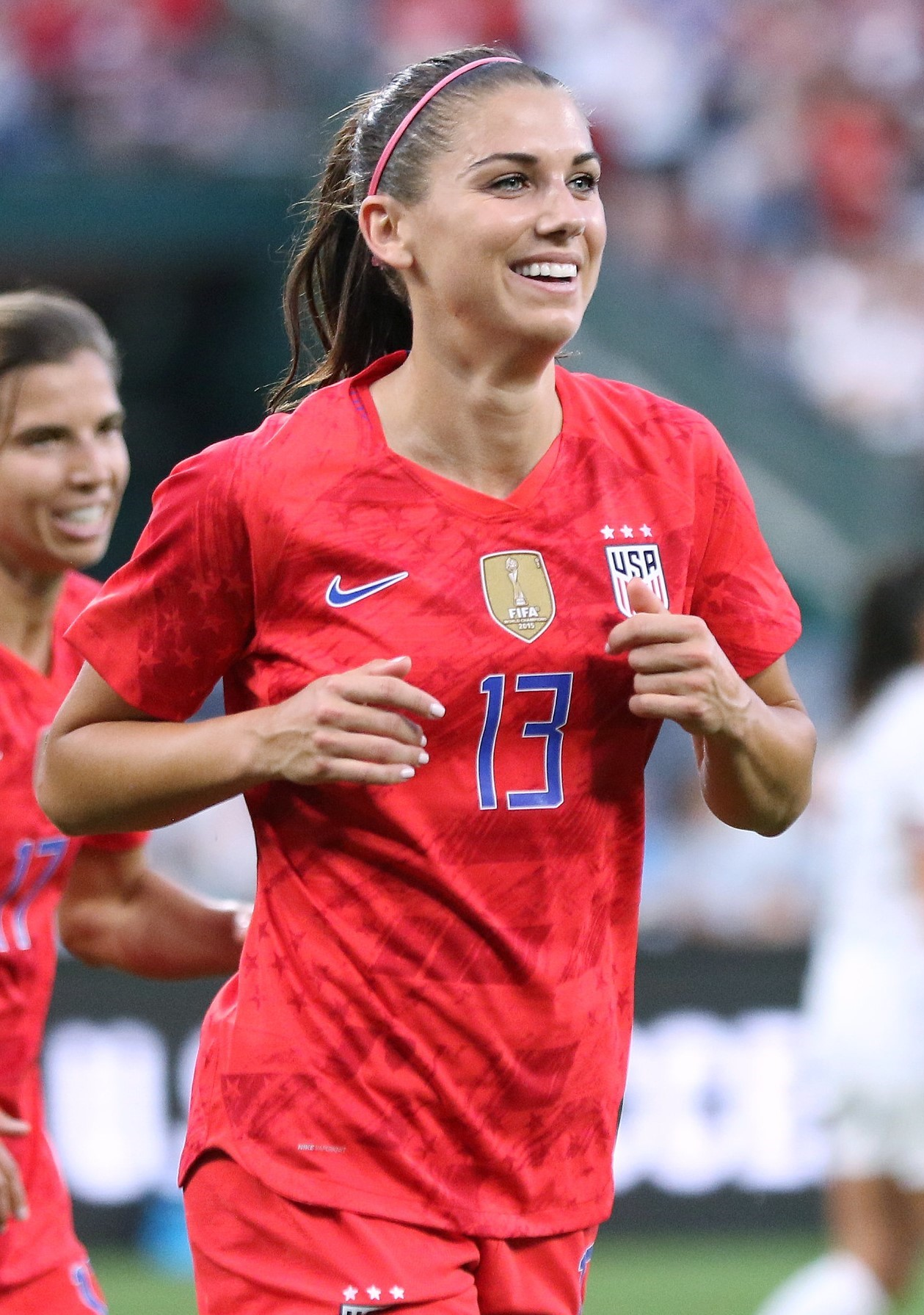
- Morgan with the United States in 2019

Personal information
- Full name: Alexandra Morgan Carrasco
- Birth name: Alexandra Patricia Morgan
- Date of birth: July 2, 1989 (age 37)
- Place of birth: San Dimas, California, U.S.
- Height: 5 ft 7 in (1.70 m)
- Position: Striker

Youth career
- Club soccer: AYSO Region 31

College career
Years	Team	Apps	(Gls)
2007–2010	California Golden Bears	67	(45)

Senior career*
Years	Team	Apps	(Gls)
2008–2009	West Coast FC	2	(2)
2010	California Storm	3	(5)
2010	Pali Blues	3	(1)
2011	Western New York Flash	13	(4)
2012	Seattle Sounders Women	3	(2)
2013–2015	Portland Thorns	36	(15)
2016	Orlando Pride	15	(4)
2017	Lyon	8	(5)
2017–2020	Orlando Pride	38	(14)
2020	Tottenham Hotspur	4	(2)
2021	Orlando Pride	13	(5)
2022–2024	San Diego Wave	48	(22)
Total		186	(81)

International career
2008	United States U20	10	(5)
2010–2024	United States	224	(123)
Medal record
Women's soccer
Representing United States
Olympic Games
Gold medal – first place	2012 London	Team
Bronze medal – third place	2020 Tokyo	Team
FIFA Women's World Cup
Winner	2015 Canada
Winner	2019 France
Runner-up	2011 Germany
CONCACAF W Championship
Winner	2014 United States
Winner	2018 United States
Winner	2022 Mexico
FIFA U-20 Women's World Cup
Winner	2008 Chile
CONCACAF W Gold Cup
Winner	2024 United States
- * Club domestic league appearances and goals

Alexandra Morgan Carrasco (born Alexandra Patricia Morgan; July 2, 1989) is an American former professional soccer player. She played in four editions of the FIFA Women's World Cup with the United States national team, winning in 2015 and 2019, and finishing second in 2011. She co-captained the national team with Carli Lloyd and Megan Rapinoe from 2018 to 2020, and with Lindsey Horan in 2023. In 2012, Morgan and the U.S. team won the gold medal at the Summer Olympics, and Morgan registered 28 goals and 21 assists, becoming the second American woman after Mia Hamm to register 20 goals and 20 assists in a calendar year. She was named U.S. Soccer Female Athlete of the Year for 2012 and was a FIFA World Player of the Year finalist. Morgan was ranked by Time as the top-paid American female soccer player in 2015, largely due to her numerous endorsement deals.

At the professional level, Morgan was drafted number one overall in the 2011 Women's Professional Soccer Draft by the Western New York Flash. After helping the Flash win the league championship, she joined Portland Thorns FC in the inaugural season of the National Women's Soccer League. Morgan and the Thorns won the 2013 league championship before she was traded to Orlando Pride. In 2017, she signed with the French club Lyon, where she won the continental European treble, including the UEFA Women's Champions League. While playing for San Diego Wave FC in 2022, Morgan received the NWSL Golden Boot as the league's top scorer, and helped the team win the NWSL Shield the following season.

Off the field, Morgan teamed with Simon & Schuster to write The Kicks, a children's book series about four soccer players. The first book in the series, Saving the Team, debuted at number seven on The New York Times Best Seller list in May 2013. A film starring Morgan, Alex & Me, was released in 2018. Morgan was named one of Time's 100 Most Influential People in 2019 and 2022. She retired from soccer in 2024.

== Early life ==
Morgan was born to Pamela and Michael Morgan on July 2, 1989, in San Dimas, California, a suburb of Los Angeles. (Note: Attributed to multiple references:) She was raised with her two older sisters, Jennifer and Jeri, in nearby Diamond Bar. (Note: Attributed to multiple references:) She played multiple sports growing up and began playing soccer at an early age with the American Youth Soccer Organization (AYSO). Her father was one of her first coaches. She began playing club soccer at age 14 when she joined Cypress Elite. With Cypress, she won the Coast Soccer League (CSL) under-16 championship and placed third at the under-19 level.

Morgan played soccer at Diamond Bar High School, where she was known for her speed and sprinting ability. She was a three-time all-league pick and was named All-American by the National Soccer Coaches Association of America (NSCAA). She also played for Olympic Development Program (ODP) regional and state teams. She said ODP was crucial to her development as a player, due to her late entry into club soccer.

== College career ==
Morgan attended University of California, Berkeley, where she played for the California Golden Bears from 2007 to 2010. She led the Golden Bears in scoring during her first and fourth seasons. During a match against Stanford in the second round of the 2007 NCAA Division I Women's Soccer Championship, Morgan scored an equalizer with less than two minutes left in regulation time, resulting in a 1–1 draw. The Golden Bears were ultimately defeated during a penalty shootout. Morgan helped the Golden Bears reach the NCAA Tournament four years in a row, advancing to the second round twice. In her junior year, she was a finalist for the Hermann Trophy and the Honda Sports Award. Morgan finished her college career ranked third all-time in goals scored (45) and points (106) for Berkeley. She graduated one semester early, with a degree in Political Economy.

== Club career ==
=== 2011: Western New York Flash ===
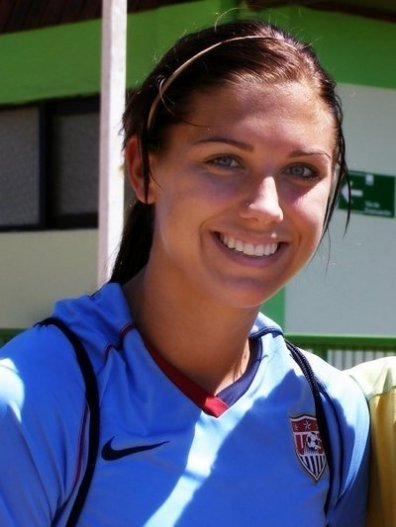
Morgan in 2011

On January 14, 2011, Morgan was the first overall pick in the 2011 Women's Professional Soccer Draft by the Western New York Flash. She scored her first goal for the Flash during their 3–0 win over the Atlanta Beat on May 1, 2011. During the 2011 season, she played in 14 matches and scored four goals. The club won the regular season title and the 2011 WPS Championship title.

=== 2012: Seattle Sounders Women ===
After the WPS suspended operations in early 2012 due to legal and financial difficulties, Morgan joined her national teammates Hope Solo, Sydney Leroux, Megan Rapinoe and Stephanie Cox on the Seattle Sounders Women for the 2012 season. (Note: Attributed to multiple references:) Morgan said she was excited to play in Seattle because of its passionate soccer fans. Due to her national team commitments and preparation for the 2012 Summer Olympics, Morgan made only three regular-season appearances for the club, scoring two goals and serving two assists. During the season, the Sounders sold out nine of their ten home matches at the 4,500-capacity Starfire Stadium. (Note: Attributed to multiple references:) Average attendance during the 2012 season for the Sounders Women was four times higher than that of the next closest team.

=== 2013–2015: Portland Thorns FC ===
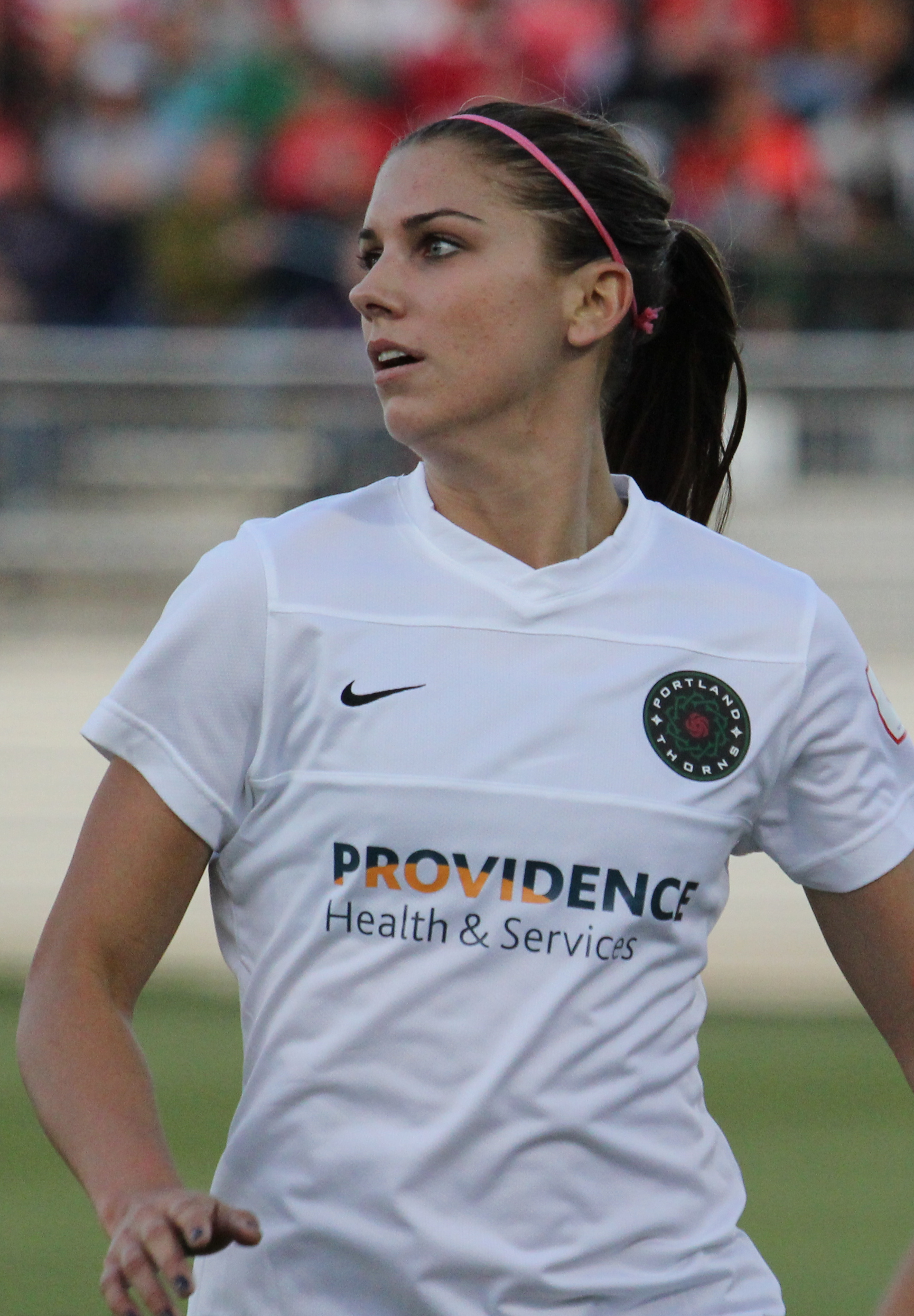
Morgan with the Portland Thorns in 2014

In January 2013, Morgan joined Portland Thorns FC for the inaugural season of the National Women's Soccer League via the NWSL Player Allocation. She scored her first goal for the Thorns on April 21 as they achieved a 2–1 victory over Seattle Reign FC. With a total of eight goals and five assists during the regular season, Morgan was the team's joint scoring leader with Christine Sinclair. The Thorns finished third in the league during the regular season, then captured the championship title by defeating Western New York Flash 2–0, with Morgan assisting on the second goal. Morgan was named to the NWSL Second XI on August 28.

During the 2014 season, Morgan scored six goals in her 15 appearances for the Thorns. The club again finished third during the regular season, but was eliminated during the playoffs. During the 2015 season, Morgan made only four appearances for the Thorns due to her national team commitments at the 2015 FIFA Women's World Cup. She scored one goal during a 3–3 draw against the Washington Spirit on August 31. The Thorns finished in sixth place during the regular season with a 6–9–5 record.

=== 2016: Orlando Pride ===
On October 26, 2015, it was announced that the Thorns had traded Morgan, along with her teammate Kaylyn Kyle, to the expansion team Orlando Pride in exchange for the Pride's number one picks in the 2015 NWSL Expansion Draft and 2016 NWSL College Draft as well as an international roster spot for the 2016 and 2017 seasons. Morgan scored four goals in her 15 appearances for the Pride. The club finished in ninth place during the regular season with a 6–13–1 record.

=== 2017: Lyon ===
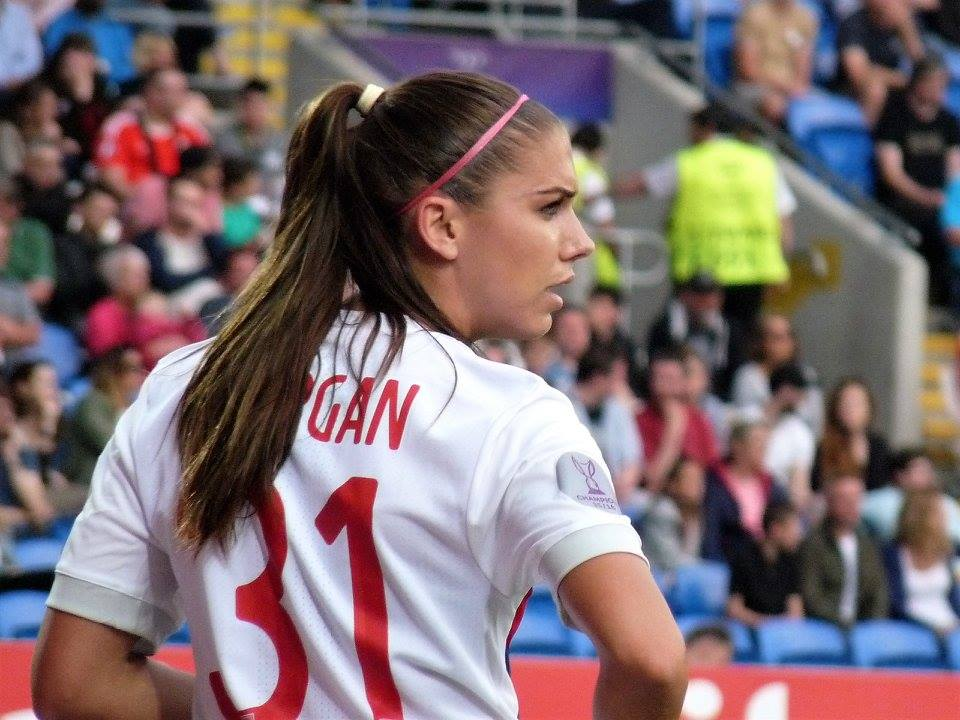
Morgan with Lyon during the Women's Champions League Final in June 2017

On January 5, 2017, Morgan signed with Division 1 Féminine club Olympique Lyonnais (Lyon) for a reported $33,000 per month. The six-month contract included a mutual option for an additional season. Morgan made her 2016–17 debut on January 14 during a 3–0 win against En Avant de Guingamp, and recorded two assists. On May 7, she scored two goals during her team's 9–0 win over ASJ Soyaux, after which Lyon was named league champions for the eleventh consecutive season. Morgan scored five goals in her eight appearances during the regular season.

On March 12, Morgan scored a hat-trick against Rodez to lead Lyon to a 6–0 win and advance to the semi-finals of the French Cup. She scored four goals and recorded two assists during the semi-final against Hénin-Beaumont, with three of the four occurring within ten minutes. Lyon won the Cup after a penalty shootout on May 19. Morgan did not play during the French Cup final due to a lingering hamstring injury suffered during a match against Paris Saint-Germain.

Morgan made her 2016–17 UEFA Women's Champions League debut in the quarterfinals on March 23 during Lyon's 2–0 win over VfL Wolfsburg. On June 1, she started in the 2017 UEFA Women's Champions League Final but was substituted off after 23 minutes due to the hamstring injury. Lyon won the match after a penalty shootout.

=== 2017–2020: Return to Orlando ===
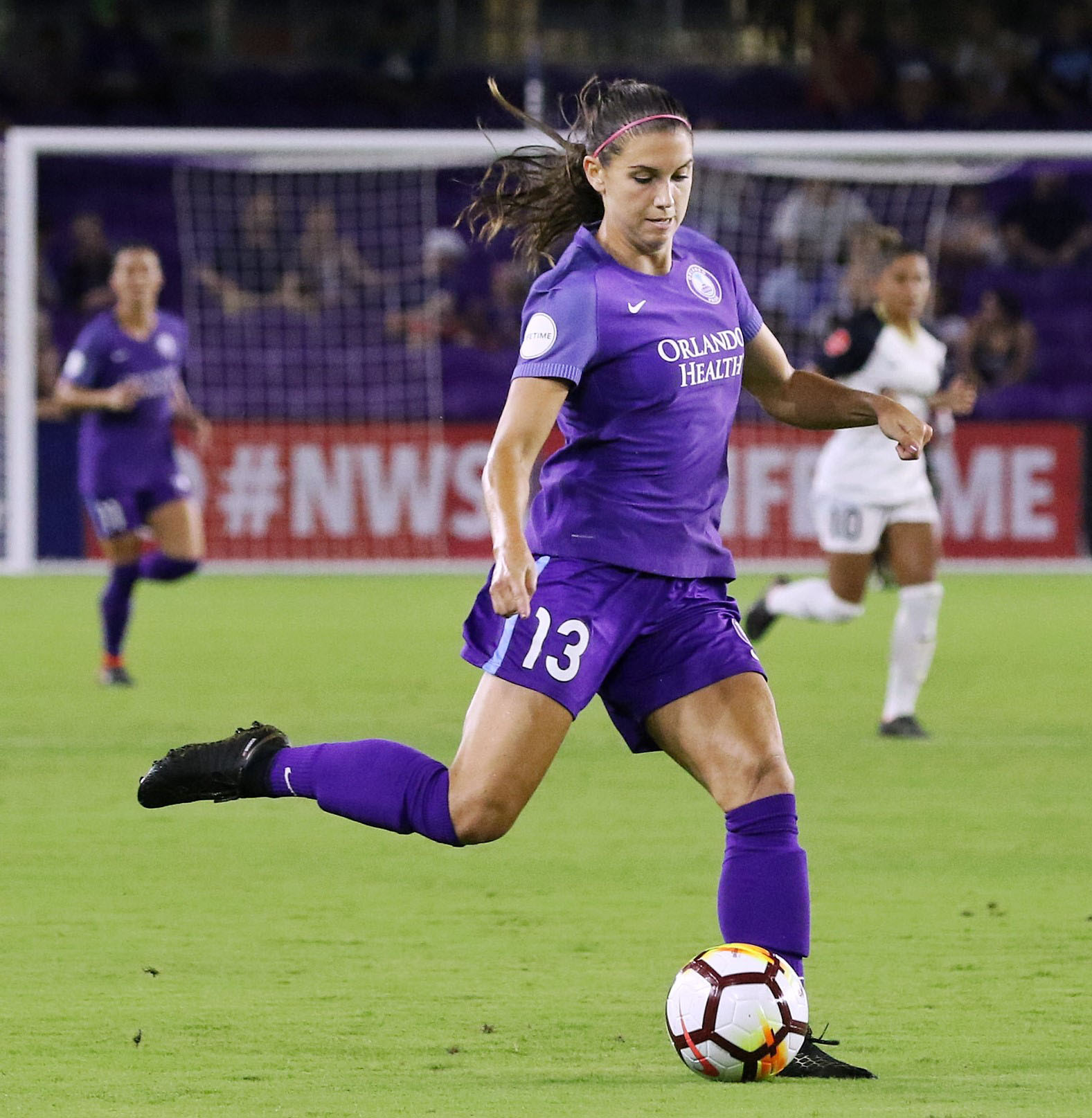
Morgan with Orlando Pride in 2018

Following the Champions League Final, the Pride announced Morgan's addition to their 2017 roster. After recovering from her hamstring injury, Morgan made her competitive return for the Pride on July 1 against the Chicago Red Stars. She scored nine goals in fourteen games in 2017, and the team achieved an 11–6–7 record. At the conclusion of the season, Morgan was named to the league's 2017 Second XI.

Even though her contract with Lyon allowed her to return in 2018, Morgan announced in September 2017 that she would end the contract early and stay with the Pride for the 2018 season. The team failed to match the success of 2017, finishing seventh out of nine teams in the league with a record of 8–10–6. Morgan played in nineteen games for the Pride, contributing five goals over the course of the season. She spent most of the 2019 season training and playing with the U.S. national team, and finished the season injured. She played in six games for the Pride in 2019 and failed to score.

=== 2020: Tottenham Hotspur ===
On September 12, 2020, Morgan signed with the English FA Women's Super League team Tottenham Hotspur. The contract reportedly ran from September through December 2020, with an option to extend the deal through May 2021 for the end of the 2020–21 FA WSL season. Morgan had not played since August 2019 and had given birth in May 2020, and it took her until November 7 to make her debut for the Spurs. She scored her first goal for the club on December 6, a penalty kick in a 3–1 victory over Brighton & Hove Albion. The following week, Morgan scored another penalty as the Spurs defeated Aston Villa 3–1. On December 21, Tottenham announced that Morgan would end her contract with the club and return to the United States.

=== 2021: Return to Orlando ===
Morgan returned to Orlando Pride ahead of the 2021 season, although she missed the start of the 2021 NWSL Challenge Cup while playing international friendlies against Sweden and France. On April 21, she served an assist on the only goal in a 1–0 Challenge Cup win over Washington Spirit. She became the first player in league history to score in each of the first four games of the regular season, and in May she was named NWSL Player of the Month for the second time in her career.

=== 2022–2024: San Diego Wave FC ===
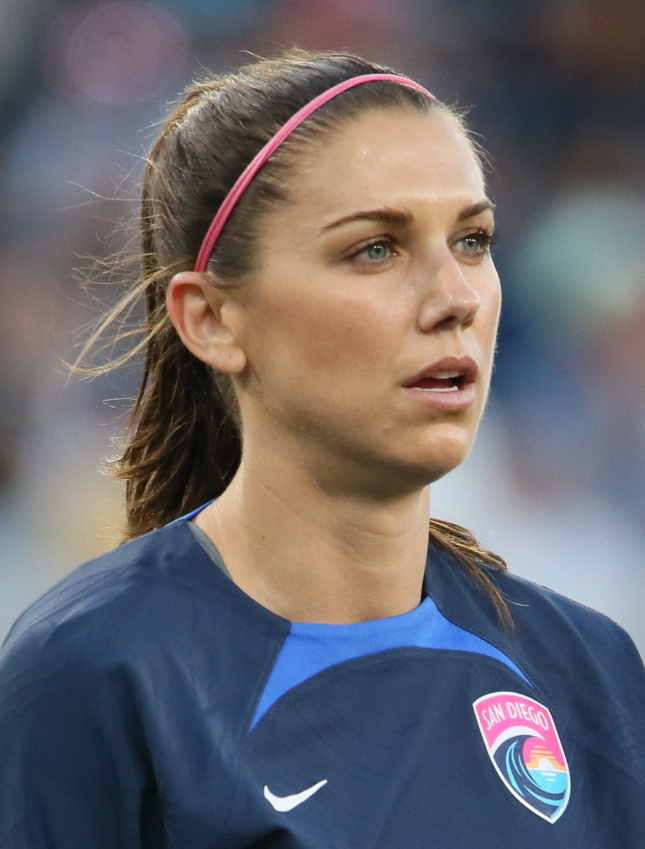
Morgan with the Wave in 2023

On December 13, 2021, the expansion team San Diego Wave FC announced Morgan's signing. Orlando received a record $275,000 in allocation money and Angharad James in return.

Morgan scored a career-high 15 goals (including five from penalty kicks) in 17 games for the Wave during the 2022 regular season. Her scoring tally won her the NWSL Golden Boot. She scored all four goals in a 4–0 win over Gotham FC on May 7, becoming the third NWSL player to score four goals in a game after Sam Kerr and Kristen Hamilton. The Wave became the first expansion team to qualify for the playoffs, losing to eventual champion Portland Thorns in the semifinals.

The following season, Morgan led the Wave to an 11–4–7 record and the NWSL Shield as the top team of the 2023 regular-season standings. She scored on the final matchday of the season in a 2–0 win over Racing Louisville, pushing the Wave two points ahead of the Thorns. The Wave lost in their first playoff game to the Seattle Reign. Morgan recorded seven goals in total for the Wave, tied for 5th most in the league that season.

Morgan opened the 2024 season with the only goal in the Challenge Cup, leading to the Wave's first victory in the event. Following the Cup, Morgan failed to score in her first 14 regular-season games. On September 5, she revealed her second pregnancy and announced that she would be retiring following the Wave match on September 8. At the time of her announcement, her 60 career goals in the NWSL ranked fourth in league history. She started her last match as a captain and was substituted after 13 minutes, in honor of the number she wore throughout her career. (Note: Attributed to multiple references:) Morgan's final match was the first women's sporting event to be shown simultaneously on multiple channels and streaming services in the United States, including CBS Sports Network, Amazon Prime Video, ESPN2, and ESPN+. Following her retirement, the Wave retired the number 13 jersey.

== International career ==
In 2006, at 17 years old, Morgan was called up to the United States under-20 women's national soccer team. While playing in a scrimmage against the men's junior national team, she sustained an anterior cruciate ligament (ACL) injury, which made her unable to play her first match for the team until the 2008 CONCACAF Women's U-20 Championship, held in Puebla, Mexico. She scored her first international goal during the tournament.

Morgan was named to the team that competed in the 2008 FIFA U-20 Women's World Cup in Chile. She scored a total of four goals during the event, with her fourth goal winning the tournament. The goal was voted the best goal of the tournament and FIFA's second-best goal of the year. Morgan's performance earned her the Bronze Shoe as the tournament's third-highest scorer and the Silver Ball as the tournament's second-best player, behind her teammate Sydney Leroux.

Morgan first appeared for the senior national team in a match against Mexico in March 2010. In October of that year, she scored her first international goal during a 1–1 draw with China. The following month, she entered a match against Italy in the 86th minute and scored in the fourth minute of added time, giving the United States a 1–0 victory in the first leg of a playoff to qualify for the 2011 Women's World Cup. Morgan's national teammates would eventually give her the nickname "Baby Horse" for her speed, running style, and youth. (Note: Attributed to multiple references:)

=== 2011 FIFA Women's World Cup ===
Morgan was the youngest player on the U.S. national team that competed in the 2011 FIFA Women's World Cup. On July 13, 2011, she scored her first World Cup goal in the United States' 3–1 semi-final victory over France. In the final against Japan, she contributed one goal and one assist as the U.S. lost in a penalty shoot-out following a 2–2 draw. Morgan was the first player of any gender to record both a goal and an assist in a World Cup final.

=== 2012 London Olympics ===
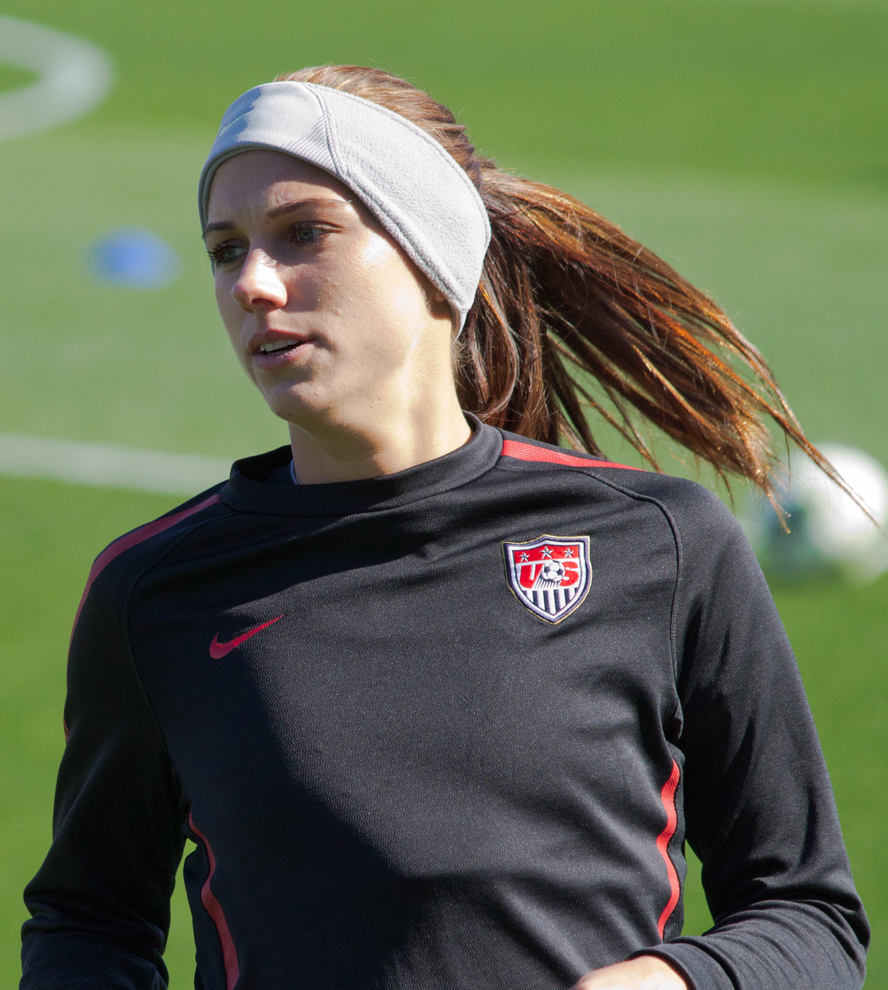
Morgan with the U.S. women's national team in Frisco, Texas in 2012

Morgan became a starter for the U.S. in the final of the CONCACAF Olympic qualifying tournament. She scored twice and provided two assists to Abby Wambach in a 4–0 win over Canada. Between January and late May 2012, Morgan scored 14 goals in a 12-match stretch, which included three two-goal matches in a row. (Note: Attributed to multiple references:) She achieved her first career hat-trick on March 7 during a 4–0 victory over Sweden in the third-place match of the 2012 Algarve Cup. In June, she was nominated for an ESPY Award as the Best Breakthrough Athlete.

Morgan scored twice in the opening match of the group stage at the 2012 London Olympics as the U.S. defeated France 4–2. She assisted the match-winning goal during her team's next three matches, (Note: Attributed to multiple references:) then scored the winning goal in the semifinal against Canada, sending the U.S. to the gold medal match against Japan. Her goal came in the 123rd minute, the latest goal ever scored by a member of the U.S. women's team and a FIFA record. The goal continued her propensity for late heroics in the closing stages of matches. Seventeen of her 28 total goals to date have come after the 60th minute. The match-winning goal was Morgan's team-high 20th in 2012, becoming only the sixth and youngest U.S. player to do so in a single year. In the final, a 2–1 win against Japan on August 9, Morgan assisted on a Carli Lloyd header. She ended the tournament with three goals, and a team-high four assists (tied with Megan Rapinoe) and ten points (tied with Rapinoe and Wambach). To celebrate her achievements, she was honored at her former high school and the No. 13 jersey was retired.

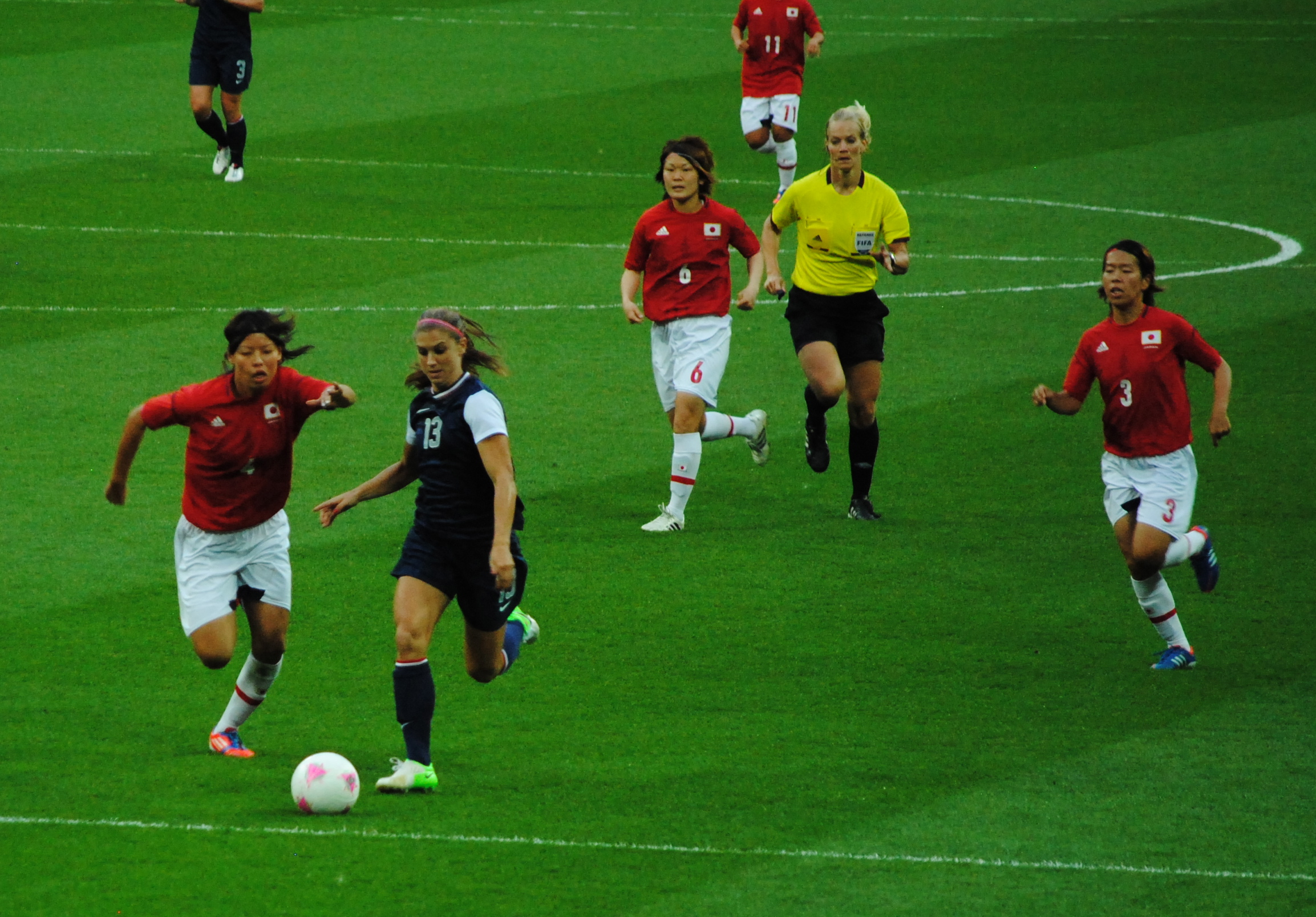
Morgan challenges Japanese defender Saki Kumagai for the ball as Mizuho Sakaguchi (6) and Azusa Iwashimizu (3) look on during their gold medal match at the 2012 Summer Olympics.

In 2012, Morgan led the U.S. in goals (28), multi-goal matches (9), assists (21) and points (77). Her calendar year goals, assists and points totals are the third-best, tied second-best (one tally shy of record), and second-best, respectively, in USWNT history. Morgan joined an exclusive club as she and Hamm are the only USWNT players to record at least 20 goals and 20 assists in the same calendar year and became only the third and youngest player to reach 20 assists in a calendar year. Morgan and Wambach combined for 55 goals in 2012 – matching a 21-year-old record set in 1991 by Michelle Akers (39 goals) and Carin Jennings (16 goals) as the most goals scored by any duo in USWNT history. She had either scored or assisted on 41 percent of the U.S.'s 120 goals this year. And, by herself, she comfortably out-scored and out-assisted her opponents, who combined for 21 goals and 12 assists in 32 matches against the U.S.

For her excellence on the field, U.S. Soccer announced Morgan as the 2012 Female Athlete of the Year. Morgan's exploits have also earned her a place on the FIFA Ballon d'Or shortlist, ultimately finished third in voting.

=== 2013–14 ===
At the 2013 Algarve Cup, Morgan shared top-scoring honors. She finished the competition with four assists and three goals, including the equalizer against Sweden that advanced the U.S. to the final and the two goals against Germany that won the championship. She previously won the tournament's golden boot in 2011. On June 2, 2013, Morgan scored two-second-half goals as the U.S. defeated Canada 3–0 in front of a sold-out crowd in Toronto. This was the first match between U.S. and Canada since the epic semi-final of the 2012 Olympic Games. Morgan was named to her third appearance on the 10-player short list for FIFA Women's World Player of the Year in 2013 and finished fourth in the voting. For the inaugural CONCACAF Awards, she was recognized as the CONCACAF 2013 Female Player of the Year. And as a part of U.S. Soccer's celebration of its Centennial anniversary the Federation revealed the U.S. Soccer's All-Time Women's National Team Best XI, she was youngest player selected at 24 years old.

Morgan had a return of five goals in seven matches for the USWNT in 2014 after returning from injury before she reinjured her ankle at the 2014 CONCACAF Women's Championship, which ruled her out for the rest of tournament.

=== 2015 FIFA Women's World Cup ===
Morgan scored in a 1–0 friendly win over England in February upon her return to the international fold. She was part of the USWNT that won its tenth Algarve Cup in 2015. She scored in the 3–0 defeat of Switzerland.

Morgan spent two months recovering from a knee injury in the build-up to the 2015 FIFA Women's World Cup. Morgan's knee injury happened in April during the NWSL season against the Boston Breakers. She made her first start at the World Cup finals as the U.S. defeated Nigeria 1–0 in the last group match to advance as group winners. She registered her only goal of the World Cup's knockout stage with the opener in the 2–0 last 16 win over Colombia. Morgan did, however, win penalties for the USWNT in the 2–0 victories against Colombia in the last 16 and Germany in the semi-finals, respectively. She then started the 2015 FIFA Women's World Cup final as the USWNT defeated Japan 5–2 to win its third FIFA Women's World Cup. Morgan played in all seven World Cup finals matches and started in every one of them since being restored to the starting XI against Nigeria.

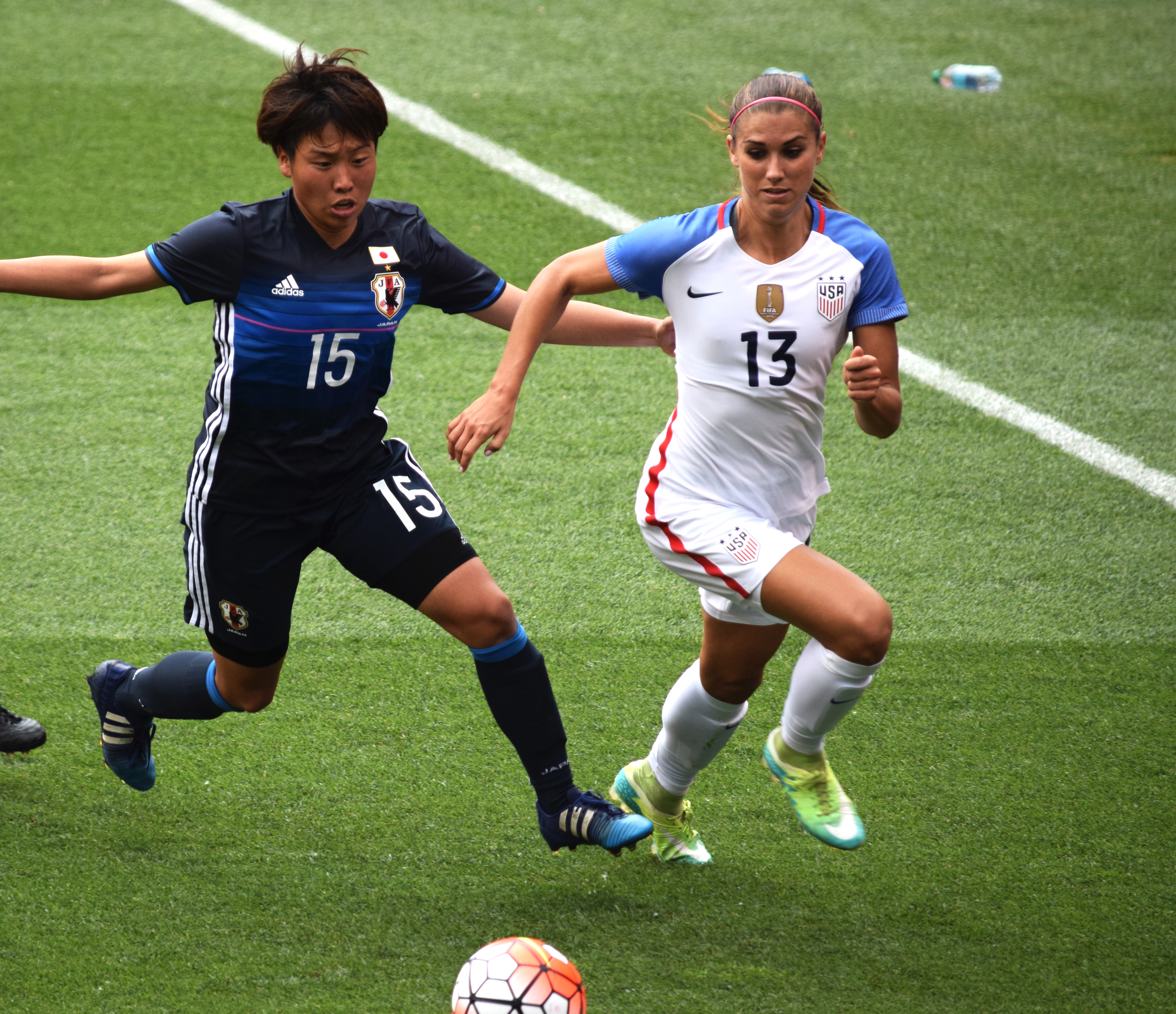
Morgan being challenged by Hikari Takagi (15) during a match against Japan in Cleveland on June 5, 2016

=== 2016 Rio Olympics ===
At the first SheBelieves Cup competition in March 2016, an invitational four-team tournament consisted of England, France, Germany and the United States, Morgan was awarded the Golden Boot and the MVP award. She scored in victories against France and Germany as the USWNT won the tournament with three wins from three. Morgan scored eight goals during her first nine appearances of 2016.

Morgan marked her 100th cap for the USWNT in a 5–0 friendly win against Republic of Ireland on January 23, by registering a goal and an assist. At the CONCACAF Olympic Qualifiers in February, Morgan scored the fastest recorded goal in tournament history and in the history of the USWNT, netting after just 12 seconds, before later adding a second, in a 5–0 defeat of Costa Rica. She followed this up with her third career hat-trick in a win against Trinidad and Tobago, as the USWNT secured their qualification for the Rio Olympics. Morgan started in the qualification final against Canada, as the USWNT won 2–0 to be crowned tournament winners. She was voted in the Best XI for the tournament.

Morgan was named to the United States' 18-player roster for the Rio Olympics on July 12, 2016. She started and scored a goal in the team's opening match vs New Zealand on August 3. The United States was knocked out of the tournament in the quarter-final round via a penalty shootout loss to Sweden. Morgan scored the equalizer in regulation time to draw the match level, but missed her penalty in the ensuing shootout. Morgan ended her 2016 national team goal scoring campaign with a brace of goals in the team's 8–1 victory over Romania on November 10.

=== 2017–2018 ===
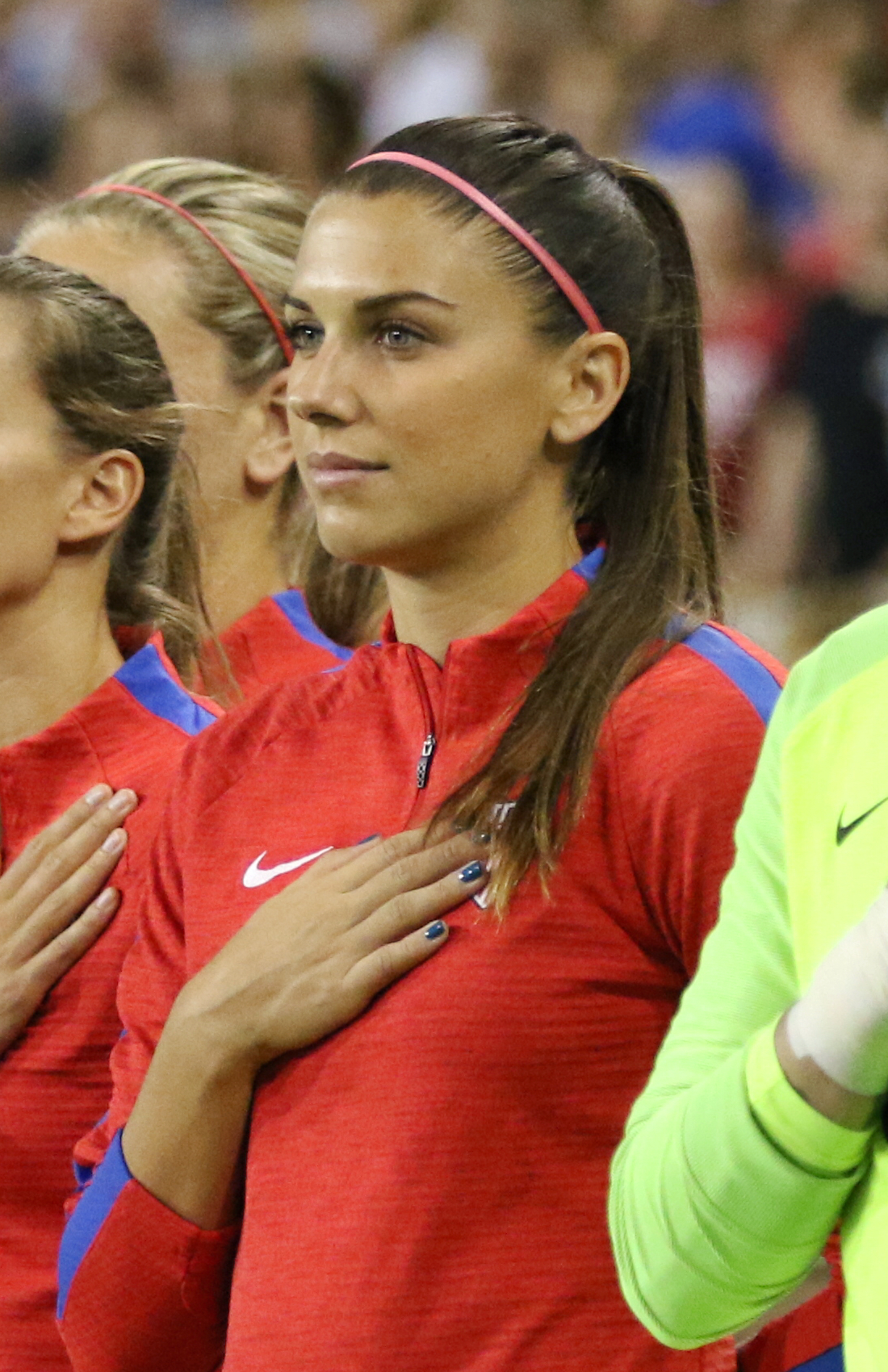
Morgan in 2018

Morgan made three appearances at the 2017 SheBelieves Cup, including a start vs England on March 4. On May 26, she was named to the team's roster for two abroad June friendlies vs Sweden and Norway, but withdrew in the coming days after suffering a hamstring injury. Morgan was then included in the United States 23-player roster for the 2017 Tournament of Nations, where she scored one goal in a match vs Japan on August 3. She ended the year strong, leading the team in goals scored with seven.

In 2018, Morgan won U.S. Soccer's Female Player of the Year award. She was nominated alongside Julie Ertz, Tobin Heath, Lindsey Horan and Megan Rapinoe. She tallied 18 goals total in 19 appearances for the United States in 2018. This included her fourth career hat-trick vs Japan at the 2018 Tournament of Nations and her seven goals at the 2018 CONCACAF Women's Championship, where she won the golden boot as the tournaments top scorer. She helped the team qualify for the 2019 FIFA Women's World Cup in the semifinal of that tournament scoring twice in a 6–0 win vs Jamaica on October 14. Morgan then won the CONCACAF Women's Championship for the second time in her career after helping her team defeat Canada 2–0 in the final on October 17, where she contributed one goal.

=== 2019 FIFA World Cup ===
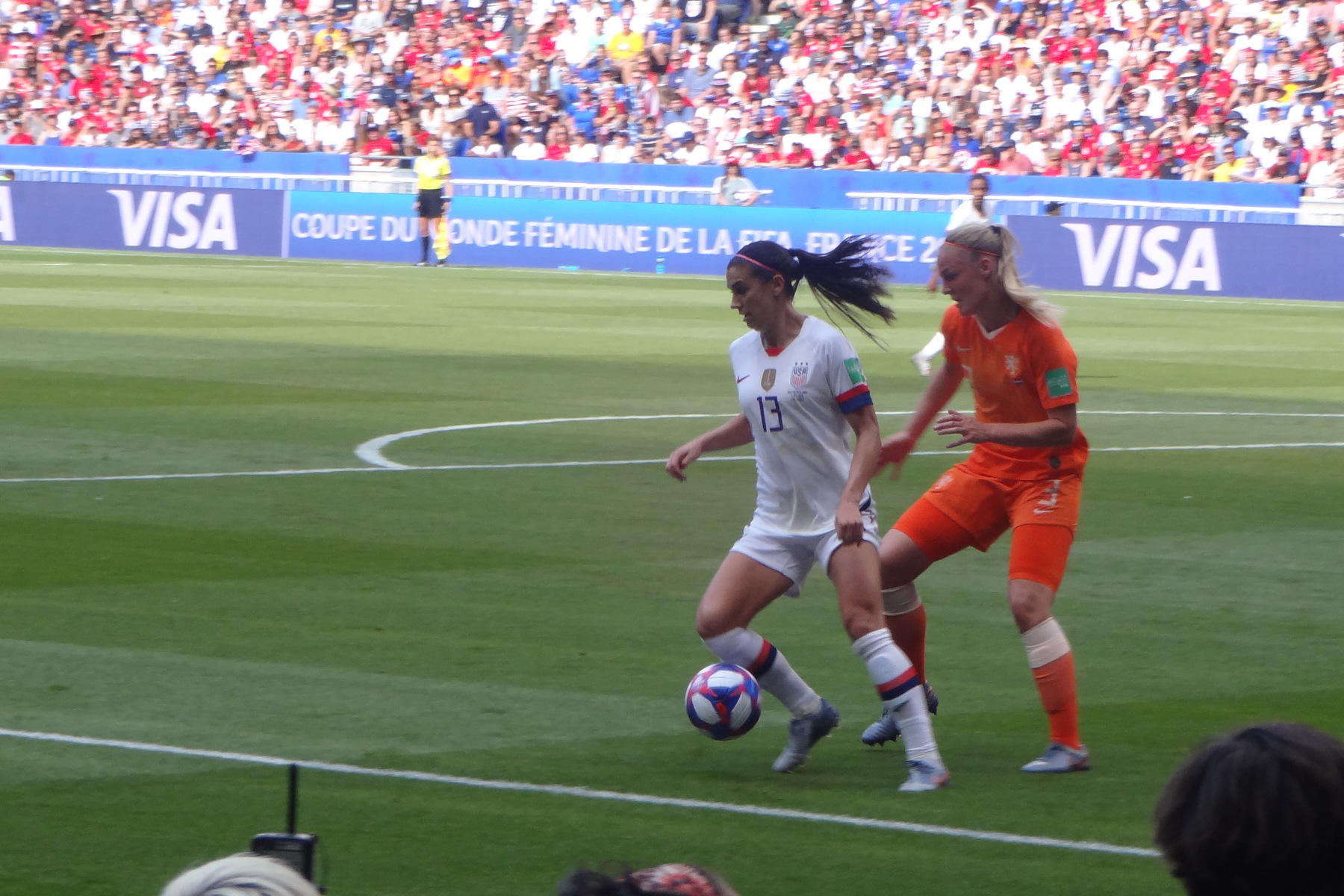
Morgan in the 2019 FIFA Women's World Cup Final up against dutch defender Stefanie van der Gragt

In the lead up to the 2019 FIFA Women's World Cup, Morgan scored her 100th career international goal in a friendly vs Australia on April 4, 2019. As a leader of the USWNT at the 2019 FIFA Women's World Cup, Morgan scored five goals in the opening group game against Thailand to equal the World Cup single-game goals record set by Michelle Akers in 1991. Morgan also registered three assists in the game. The team's 13–0 scoreline set a new record for margin of victory in a World Cup match. On July 2, 2019, Morgan became the first woman to score a world cup goal on her birthday, in a 2–1 win over England to reach the 2019 FIFA Women's World Cup final. In the final on July 7, Morgan helped win a penalty that was later converted by Megan Rapinoe to open the scoring, as the United States defeated the Netherlands 2–0. Morgan was awarded the tournament's Silver Boot, finishing as the joint-top scorer with six goals but losing out to Megan Rapinoe on a fewest-minutes tiebreaker. She was named to the bench in the opening friendly of the Victory Tour against Ireland but was unused, and then was ruled out for the rest of the games with a season-ending ankle injury.

=== 2020 Tokyo Olympics ===
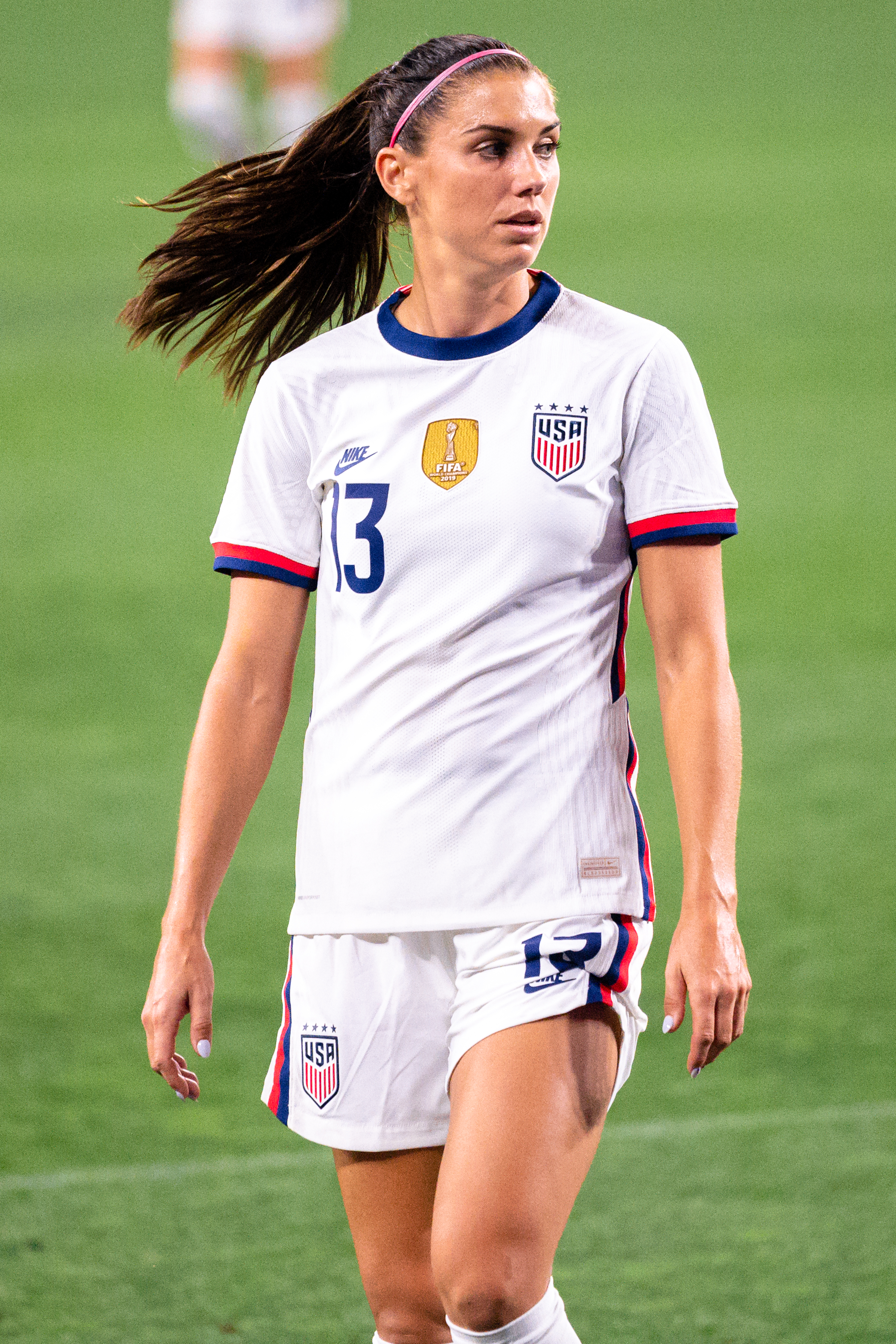
Morgan in 2021

Morgan missed the 2020 CONCACAF Women's Olympic Qualifying Championship and 2020 SheBelieves Cup due to pregnancy. With club and international soccer severely disrupted during the COVID-19 pandemic, Morgan made her national team comeback and first appearance under new head coach Vlatko Andonovski on November 27, 2020, in a friendly against the Netherlands, 509 days since her last appearance against the same opposition in the 2019 World Cup final. In February 2021, she was named to the 2021 SheBelieves Cup roster. In June 2021, Morgan was named in the 18-player United States Women's soccer team roster for the delayed 2020 Tokyo Olympics. She appeared in all six matches for the United States in the tournament, which saw the team take home the bronze medal on August 5 following their 4–3 victory over Australia. Morgan scored in the team's 6–1 group stage win over New Zealand on July 24, and converted a penalty kick in the team's quarter-final shootout win over the Netherlands on July 30. On September 21, 2021, Morgan scored her sixth career international hat-trick for the United States in a friendly against Paraguay in Cincinnati.

=== 2022 ===
Ahead of two abroad friendlies vs Australia in November 2021, USWNT head coach Vlatko Andonovski opted to leave a core group of veteran players off of his 22-player roster, which included Morgan. He cited that he needed to give roster spots to younger players to award them valuable minutes ahead of the 2023 FIFA Women's World Cup. As a result of this decision, Morgan subsequently was not included in the 23-player roster for the 2022 SheBelieves Cup in February. On June 13, 2022, Morgan was recalled to the national team ahead of two friendlies vs Colombia and the 2022 CONCACAF W Championship. Morgan helped the team win their third consecutive CONCACAF title and directly qualify for the 2024 Paris Olympics, scoring the game winner on a penalty kick in a 1–0 victory over Canada in the final. She also helped the United States clinch qualification for the 2023 FIFA Women's World Cup scoring twice in the team's opening match against Haiti on July 4, and being in the squad for the team's 5–0 win over Jamaica on July 7. She was named to the tournament's best XI and was awarded golden ball as the tournament's best player. Morgan was also the joint top scorer of the tournament having scored three goals; tied with Julia Grosso, Jessie Fleming, and Khadija Shaw.

=== 2023 FIFA Women's World Cup ===
Morgan made her fourth World Cup appearance in 2023. She started all three group stage games, as well as the Round of 16 game against Sweden. However, she obtained no goals and only one assist over the course of the tournament. The U.S. lost the match in a penalty shootout, making it the first time the team was eliminated before quarterfinals.

=== 2024 ===
After teammate Mia Fishel tore her ACL during the final day of training for the 2024 CONCACAF W Gold Cup, Morgan was called to the squad as her replacement. She wore the number 7 jersey instead of her usual 13. In their first game of the tournament, Morgan scored a goal against the Dominican Republic.

Morgan was not selected to the 18-player roster for the 2024 Summer Olympics, making this the first major tournament for the United States without Morgan since the 2008 Olympics. She announced her retirement from both club and international soccer via a social media video on September 5, 2024, saying "It has been a long time coming, and this decision wasn't easy, but at the beginning of 2024 I felt in my heart and soul that this was the last season that I would play soccer." She retired in 2024 after announcing her pregnancy with her second child.

== Other work ==
=== Books and television series ===
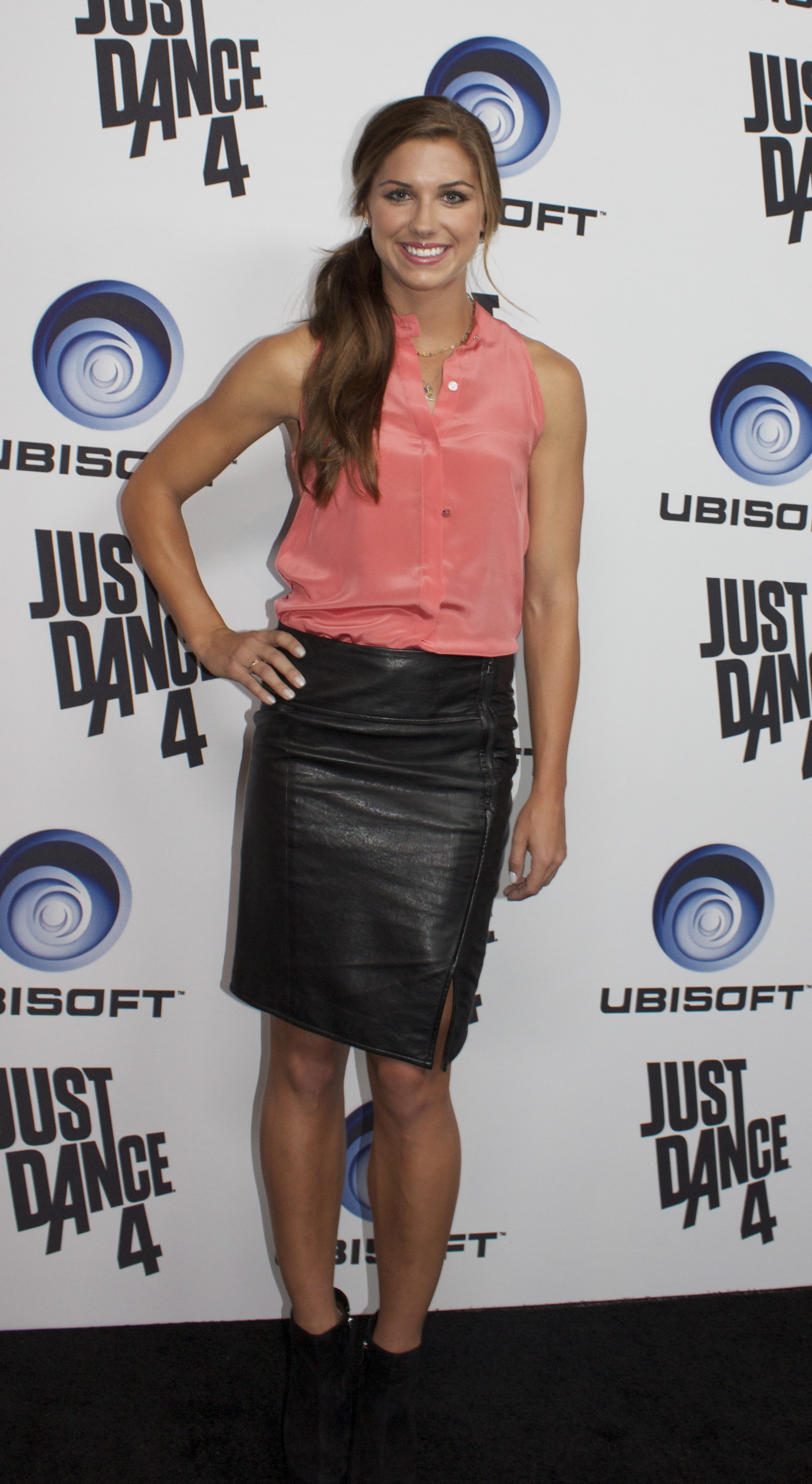
Morgan is a published novelist, and has featured in a number of advertisement campaigns and modeling assignments

In 2011, James Frey, whose daughter was a fan of Morgan, approached her with the idea of creating a book series based around soccer for young girls. The two worked together to create it and, in 2012, Morgan signed with Simon & Schuster to pen The Kicks, a four-book series for middle-grade readers. The series is focused on four young girls and features themes of friendship, leadership, and soccer. In a statement released by the publisher, Morgan said she wanted her books to "inspire young girls" and "celebrate" her love of soccer. The first novel, Saving The Team, was released on May 14, 2013, followed by the second novel, Sabotage Season, on September 3, 2013. Saving the Team debuted at number seven on The New York Times Best Seller list for Children's Middle Grade in its first week of sales. Frey's production company, Full Fathom Five, later produced a live-action kids comedy series based on the books, called The Kicks. The series was greenlit by Amazon Prime in 2014 and began airing in 2015.

=== Endorsements ===
Morgan has signed several endorsement deals with businesses including Nike, Panasonic, AT&T, Chobani, McDonald's, P&G, Mondelez International, and Coca-Cola. Time named Morgan the highest paid American women's soccer player in June 2015 attributed mostly to her endorsement deals. In July 2011, she signed a one-year endorsement deal with Bank of America. In January 2012, Morgan and national teammate Heather Mitts became brand ambassadors for health product company, GNC. The same year, she made appearances on behalf of Ubisoft promoting the launch of their video game, Just Dance 4. In 2013, she appeared in television commercials for Bridgestone. She joined a two-year partnership as the spokesperson for ChapStick in October 2013. In 2015, she starred in a Nationwide Mutual Insurance Company commercial that was broadcast nationwide in the United States. She appeared in commercials for Chobani in 2016. In July 2018, Morgan joined the team of ambassadors at Molecule, an athlete recovery mattress and bedding company.

=== Advocacy ===
In 2016, Morgan joined UNICEF Kid Power as a UNICEF Kid Power Champion, in an effort to fight global malnutrition and as well as raise awareness among kids, via the world's first "wearable for good", created by UNICEF.

In 2017, Morgan and U.S. teammate Megan Rapinoe were the first two female players in the United States to sign up for the Common Goal campaign, created by Juan Mata of Manchester United. Participating players donate 1% of their wages to support soccer-related charities. The same year, Morgan and her husband, Servando Carrasco, traveled to Tanzania as Sports Envoys with the Sports Diplomacy Office of the U.S. State Department. The couple hosted soccer clinics and visited schools, contributing to Sports Diplomacy's mission to promote gender equality and inclusion through sport.

=== In popular culture ===
==== Magazines ====
Morgan has been featured in a number of magazines. In the 2012 Sports Illustrated Swimsuit Issue, she appeared in a section composed of athletes in body paint. She was featured in the 2013 music issue of ESPN The Magazine replicating Katy Perry's One of the Boys album cover. In May 2015, Morgan was featured on the cover of ESPN Magazine with teammates Abby Wambach and Sydney Leroux. The same year, she appeared on multiple covers of Sports Illustrated before and after winning the 2015 FIFA Women's World Cup. She appeared for a second time in the Sports Illustrated Swimsuit Issue in 2015. Morgan posed for one of the three 2019 Sports Illustrated Swimsuit Issue covers, the other cover models being Tyra Banks and Camille Kostek. She has appeared on the covers of Health and Self magazines. She has been featured in Shape, Vogue, Elle, Time, and Fortune.

==== Television, film and music video appearances ====
In 2011, Morgan co-starred with national teammate Hope Solo in a television commercial promoting ESPN's SportsCenter. Morgan and teammate Carli Lloyd were guests on Live with Kelly and Michael following the 2012 Summer Olympics in September 2012. In 2013, Morgan appeared in the ESPN documentary series, Nine for IX. The Nine for IX documentary, The 99ers, in which she appeared focused on the success and legacy of the national team squad that won the 1999 FIFA Women's World Cup. In January 2015, she guest-starred on an episode of Nicky, Ricky, Dicky & Dawn entitled The Quad Test. In April 2015, Morgan joined Abby Wambach on American Idol to announce that the show's season winner would record the official song for Fox's coverage of the 2015 FIFA Women's World Cup. In May of the same year, her likeness appeared on The Simpsons along with Christen Press and Abby Wambach. Morgan was a presenter at the 2015 ESPY Awards and received an ESPY with her teammates for Best Team. In 2018, Morgan made an appearance in the music video for the Maroon 5 song "Girls Like You", which features Cardi B. She was joined by fellow athletes Danica Patrick, Aly Raisman and Chloe Kim who also appeared in the video. In June 2018, Morgan made her acting debut in the direct-to-video film Alex & Me with co-star Siena Agudong, where she portrays a poster of herself who comes to life. On July 17, 2023, it was announced that Morgan will be one of the players featured in an upcoming Netflix documentary about the U.S. Women’s National Soccer Team competing in the 2023 FIFA Women’s World Cup. The docuseries is slated to premiere this fall.

==== Video games ====
In July 2015, Morgan, and her Portland Thorns teammates Christine Sinclair and Steph Catley became the first female athletes to appear on the cover of EA Sports' latest FIFA video game, FIFA 16. Morgan, Sinclair, and Catley were chosen to appear on its region-specific packaging in the U.S., Canada, and Australia, respectively, alongside Lionel Messi, who appears in worldwide versions of the game. FIFA 16 was the first edition of the franchise to include women's international teams in the game. In FIFA 19, Morgan was featured throughout The Journey as an interactive character and is credited with a voice role. She was also consulted by EA to help give insight and shape the world of Kim Hunter, the game mode's playable female character.

==== Ticker tape parade and White House honor ====
Following the United States' win at the 2015 FIFA Women's World Cup, Morgan and her teammates became the first women's sports team to be honored with a ticker tape parade in New York City. Each player received a key to the city from Mayor Bill de Blasio. In October of the same year, the team was honored by President Barack Obama at the White House.

== Personal life ==
Morgan married the soccer player Servando Carrasco in 2014. The couple had met at UC Berkeley, where they both played soccer. They have a daughter (born in 2020), and two sons (born in 2025 and 2026). (Note: Attributed to multiple references:)

In 2016, Morgan received the key to the city of Diamond Bar, her hometown. The following year, she and two other athletes were banned from Disney property during a visit to Walt Disney World Resort in Florida. A police report described them as being "impaired and verbally aggressive". Morgan later apologized for her behavior on Twitter.

Morgan is a vegan; she and NBA player Kyrie Irving were named the Most Beautiful Vegan Celebrities of 2019 by PETA. (Note: Attributed to multiple references:)

== Career statistics ==
=== College ===
Appearances and goals by college team and year
College team	Year	Apps	Goals
California Golden Bears	2007	17	8
California Golden Bears	2008	17	9
California Golden Bears	2009	21	14
California Golden Bears	2010	12	14
Total		67	45

=== Club ===
Appearances and goals by club, season and competition
Club	Season	League					Cup (Note: Includes Coupe de France Féminine, FA Women's League Cup and NWSL Challenge Cup)		Continental		Total		Ref.
Club	Season	Division	Regular season		Play-offs		Cup		Continental		Total		Ref.
Club	Season	Division	Apps	Goals	Apps	Goals	Apps	Goals	Apps	Goals	Apps	Goals	Ref.
West Coast FC	2008	WPSL	1	2	0	0	–		–		1	2	
West Coast FC	2009	WPSL	1	0	—		–		–		1	0	
West Coast FC	Total		2	2	0	0	–		–		2	2	—
California Storm	2010	WPSL	3	5	0	0	–		–		3	5	
Pali Blues	2010	USL W-League	3	1	0	0	–		–		3	1	
Western New York Flash	2011	WPS	13	4	1	0	–		–		14	4	
Seattle Sounders	2012	USL W-League	3	2	0	0	–		–		3	2	
Portland Thorns FC	2013	NWSL	18	8	1	0	–		–		19	8	
Portland Thorns FC	2014	NWSL	14	6	1	0	–		–		15	6	
Portland Thorns FC	2015	NWSL	4	1	—		–		–		4	1	
Portland Thorns FC	Total		36	15	2	0	–		–		38	15	—
Orlando Pride	2016	NWSL	15	4	–		–		–		15	4	
Orlando Pride	2017	NWSL	13	9	1	0	–		–		14	9	
Orlando Pride	2018	NWSL	19	5	–		–		–		19	5	
Orlando Pride	2019	NWSL	6	0	–		–		–		6	0	
Orlando Pride	2020	NWSL	–		–		0	0	–		0	0	
Orlando Pride	2021	NWSL	13	5	–		2	0	–		15	5	
Orlando Pride	Total		66	23	1	0	2	0	—		69	23	—
Lyon	2016–17	Division 1 Féminine	8	5	—		3	7	5 (Note: Appearances in UEFA Women's Champions League)	0	16	12	
Tottenham Hotspur	2020–21	FA WSL	4	2	—		1	0	—		5	2	
San Diego Wave FC	2022	NWSL	17	15	2	1	6	4	–		25	20	
San Diego Wave FC	2023	NWSL	18	7	1	0	1	0	–		20	7	
San Diego Wave FC	2024	NWSL	13	0	0	0	1	1	3 (Note: Appearances in NWSL x Liga MX Femenil Summer Cup)	0	17	1	
San Diego Wave FC	Total		48	22	3	1	8	5	3	0	62	28	—
Career total			186	81	7	1	14	12	8	0	215	94	—

=== International ===
As of match played June 4, 2024

Appearances and goals by national team and year
National team	Year	Apps	Goals	Ref.
United States	2010	8	4	
United States	2011	19	6	
United States	2012	31	28	
United States	2013	12	6	
United States	2014	7	5	
United States	2015	22	7	
United States	2016	21	17	
United States	2017	14	7	
United States	2018	19	18	
United States	2019	16	9	
United States	2020	1	0	
United States	2021	20	8	
United States	2022	10	4	
United States	2023	15	2	
United States	2024	9	2	
Total		224	123	

== Filmography ==
Year	Title	Role	Notes
2015	Nicky, Ricky, Dicky & Dawn	Herself	Episode: "The Quad Test"
2015	The Kicks	Herself	Episode: "Pilot"; also creator
2015	Taylor Swift: The 1989 World Tour Live	Herself	Concert film
2018	Alex & Me	Herself	Direct to video
2019	Alex Morgan: The Equalizer	Herself	Television miniseries; 4 episodes

=== Music videos ===
Year	Title	Artist(s)	Role	Ref.
2018	"Girls Like You" (Original, Volume 2 and Vertical Video versions)	Maroon 5 featuring Cardi B	Herself (cameo)	

== Honors ==
Western New York Flash

- WPS Championship: 2011

Portland Thorns

- NWSL Championship: 2013

Lyon

- Division 1 Féminine: 2016–17
- Coupe de France Féminine: 2016–17
- UEFA Women's Champions League: 2016–17

San Diego Wave

- NWSL Shield: 2023
- NWSL Challenge Cup: 2024

United States U20

- FIFA U-20 Women's World Cup: 2008
- CONCACAF Women's U-20 Championship runner-up: 2008

United States

- FIFA Women's World Cup: 2015, 2019
- Olympic Gold Medal: 2012
- Olympic Bronze Medal: 2020
- CONCACAF Women's Championship: 2014, 2018, 2022
- CONCACAF W Gold Cup: 2024
- CONCACAF Women's Olympic Qualifying Tournament: 2012, 2016
- SheBelieves Cup: 2016, 2018, 2021, 2022, 2023,2024
- Algarve Cup: 2011, 2013, 2015
- Four Nations Tournament: 2011

Individual

- FIFA U-20 Women's World Cup Silver Ball: 2008
- FIFA U-20 Women's World Cup Bronze Boot: 2008
- FIFA U-20 Women's World Cup All-Star Team: 2008
- ESPY Award Best Female Athlete: 2019
- ESPY Award Best Breakthrough Athlete nominee: 2012
- ESPY Award Best Moment nominee: 2013
- ESPY Award Best Team: 2015, 2019
- FIFA Women's World Cup Dream Team: 2015, 2019
- Women's Sports Foundation Sportswoman of the Year, Team Sport: 2012
- U.S. Soccer Athlete of the Year: 2012 2018
- FIFA World Player of the Year finalist: 2012
- The Best FIFA Women's Player: 2019 (finalist); 2022 (finalist)
- National Women's Soccer League Second Best XI: 2013, 2017
- CONCACAF Player of the Year: 2013, 2016, 2017, 2018
- USWNT All-Time Best XI: 2013
- SheBelieves Cup Golden Boot and Golden Ball: 2016
- FIFA FIFPRO Women's World 11: 2016, 2017, 2019, 2021, 2022, 2023
- CONCACAF Women's Championship Golden Boot: 2018
- IFFHS Women's World Team: 2017, 2018, 2019, 2022
- IFFHS World's Woman Team of the Decade 2011–2020
- IFFHS CONCACAF Woman Team of the Decade 2011–2020
- FIFA Women's World Cup Silver Boot: 2019
- Time 100 Most Influential People: 2019, 2022
- CONCACAF Women's Championship Golden Ball: 2022
- CONCACAF Women's Championship Best XI: 2022
- NWSL Golden Boot: 2022
- NWSL Best XI: 2022
- 2024 NWSL Challenge Cup: Player of the Final (MVP)

== See also ==
- List of FIFA Women's World Cup winning players
- List of Olympic medalists in soccer
- USWNT All-Time Best XI
- List of soccer players with 100 or more caps
- List of 2012 Summer Olympics medal winners
- List of University of California, Berkeley alumni in sports
- List of 2020 Summer Olympics medal winners
- List of women's footballers with 100 or more international goals
