= Guilherme Madruga =

Brazilian footballer

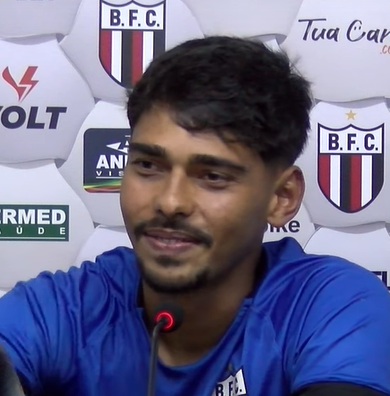
- Madruga in 2023

Personal information
- Full name: Guilherme Miranda Madruga Gomes
- Date of birth: 11 November 2000 (age 26)
- Place of birth: Campo Grande, Brazil
- Height: 1.87 m (6 ft 2 in)
- Position: Midfielder

Team information
- Current team: Shandong Taishan
- Number: 7

Youth career
- 2011–2012: São Gabriel-MS
- 2013–2014: Alto Rendimento
- 2015: Ipatinga
- 2016: José Bonifácio
- 2017–2019: Desportivo Brasil

Senior career*
| Years | Team | Apps | (Gls) |
| 2019–2021 | Desportivo Brasil | 28 | (3) |
| 2021 | → Catanduva (loan) | 7 | (0) |
| 2023 | → Botafogo-SP (loan) | 43 | (2) |
| 2024–2025 | Cuiabá | 15 | (1) |
| 2025– | Shandong Taishan | 56 | (9) |
- * Club domestic league appearances and goals as of 8 November 2026

Guilherme Miranda Madruga Gomes (born 11 November 2000) is a Brazilian professional footballer who plays as a midfielder for Shandong Taishan.

== Career ==
Born in Campo Grande but raised in São Gabriel do Oeste, both in Mato Grosso do Sul, Madruga began his career at the age of 13, under the influence of his father. Despite wanting to be a handball player, he moved back to his hometown to live with his grandparents, and played for a local school before representing Ipatinga.

In 2017, after a period with José Bonifácio, Madruga joined the youth sides of Desportivo Brasil. He made his senior debut with the latter side on 23 February 2019, starting in a 6–1 Campeonato Paulista Série A3 home routing of Rio Preto.

Madruga scored his first senior goal on 13 July 2019, netting the opener in a 1–1 away draw against Taubaté, for the year's Copa Paulista. In August 2021, he moved on loan to Campeonato Paulista Segunda Divisão side Catanduva.

Upon returning to DB, Madruga only featured in one match in the 2022 Paulista A3 before again becoming a starter in the Copa Paulista. On 18 November of that year, he was announced at Série B side Botafogo-SP, on a one-year loan deal.

On 27 June 2023, in the match against Novorizontino, Madruga scored a bicycle kick goal from outside of the area, which earned him a nomination for the 2023 FIFA Puskás Award edition and sealed Bota's 1–0 win; it was also his first goal for the club. On 21 October, he scored Botafogo's second goal in a 2–0 home win over the same opponent, this time close to the central line.

On 24 October 2023, Botafogo exercised Madruga's buyout clause, purchasing 60% of his economic rights for the upcoming season.

== Personal life ==
Madruga's father Genildo (nicknamed Eskerdinha) also played amateur football in Campo Grande during the 1990s. His older brother Gustavo also played youth football for José Bonifácio, but had to retire due to a hip injury.

== Career statistics ==
As of match played 8 November 2026.

Appearances and goals by club, season and competition
| Club | Season | League | | | State league | | Cup | | Continental | | Other | | Total | |
| Club | Season | Division | Apps | Goals | Apps | Goals | Apps | Goals | Apps | Goals | Apps | Goals | Apps | Goals |
|---|---|---|---|---|---|---|---|---|---|---|---|---|---|---|
| Desportivo Brasil | 2019 | Paulista A3 | — | | 8 | 0 | — | | — | | 12 (Note: Appearance(s) in Copa Paulista) | 1 | 20 | 1 |
| Desportivo Brasil | 2020 | Paulista A3 | — | | 5 | 2 | — | | — | | — | | 5 | 2 |
| Desportivo Brasil | 2021 | Paulista A3 | — | | 14 | 1 | — | | — | | — | | 14 | 1 |
| Desportivo Brasil | 2022 | Paulista A3 | — | | 1 | 0 | — | | — | | 11 | 1 | 12 | 1 |
| Desportivo Brasil | Total | | — | | 28 | 3 | — | | — | | 23 | 2 | 51 | 5 |
| Catanduva (loan) | 2021 | Paulista 2ª Divisão | — | | 7 | 0 | — | | — | | — | | 7 | 0 |
| Botafogo-SP (loan) | 2023 | Série B | 32 | 2 | 11 | 0 | 3 | 0 | — | | — | | 46 | 2 |
| Cuiabá | 2024 | Série A | 6 | 0 | 9 | 1 | 2 | 0 | 4 (Note: Appearance(s) in Copa Sudamericana) | 0 | 4 (Note: Appearance(s) in Copa Verde) | 0 | 25 | 1 |
| Shandong Taishan | 2025 | Chinese Super League | 28 | 4 | — | | 1 | 0 | 1 (Note: Appearance(s) in AFC Champions League Elite) | 0 | — | | 30 | 4 |
| Shandong Taishan | 2026 | Chinese Super League | 28 | 5 | — | | 3 | 0 | — | | — | | 31 | 5 |
| Shandong Taishan | Total | | 56 | 9 | — | | 4 | 0 | 1 | 0 | — | | 61 | 9 |
| Career total | | | 94 | 11 | 55 | 4 | 9 | 0 | 6 | 0 | 27 | 2 | 187 | 17 |

== Honours ==
Individual

- FIFA Puskás Award: 2023
