= USWNT All-Time Best XI =

Best female soccer players in the US, chosen in 2013

In December 2013, the USWNT All-Time Best XI was named by the United States Soccer Federation. A committee of 56 former soccer players and administrators, as well as media members, voted for the team. 11 United States women's national soccer team players were chosen, with results leaning heavily toward the team that won the 1999 World Cup. Mia Hamm and Joy Fawcett were unanimously voted into the Best XI, while Alex Morgan, the team’s youngest player (24), was named on 15 ballots.

For the complete list of the players nominated, see USWNT All-Time Best XI.

== Selected players ==
Player	Name of the player
Position	Player's primary position
Votes	Number of votes received
*	Denotes player who was active at the time
†	Elected to the National Soccer Hall of Fame

Player	Portrait	Position	Votes
Briana Scurry^{†}		Goalkeeper	31
Brandi Chastain^{†}		Defender	31
Joy Fawcett^{†}		Defender	56
Carla Overbeck^{†}		Defender	49
Christie Rampone*		Defender	46
Michelle Akers^{†}		Midfielder	55
Julie Foudy^{†}		Midfielder	40
Kristine Lilly^{†}		Midfielder	55
Mia Hamm^{†}		Forward	56
Alex Morgan*		Forward	15
Abby Wambach*		Forward	52

== See also ==
- List of sports awards honoring women
