= The Best FIFA Football Awards 2023 =

International football awards

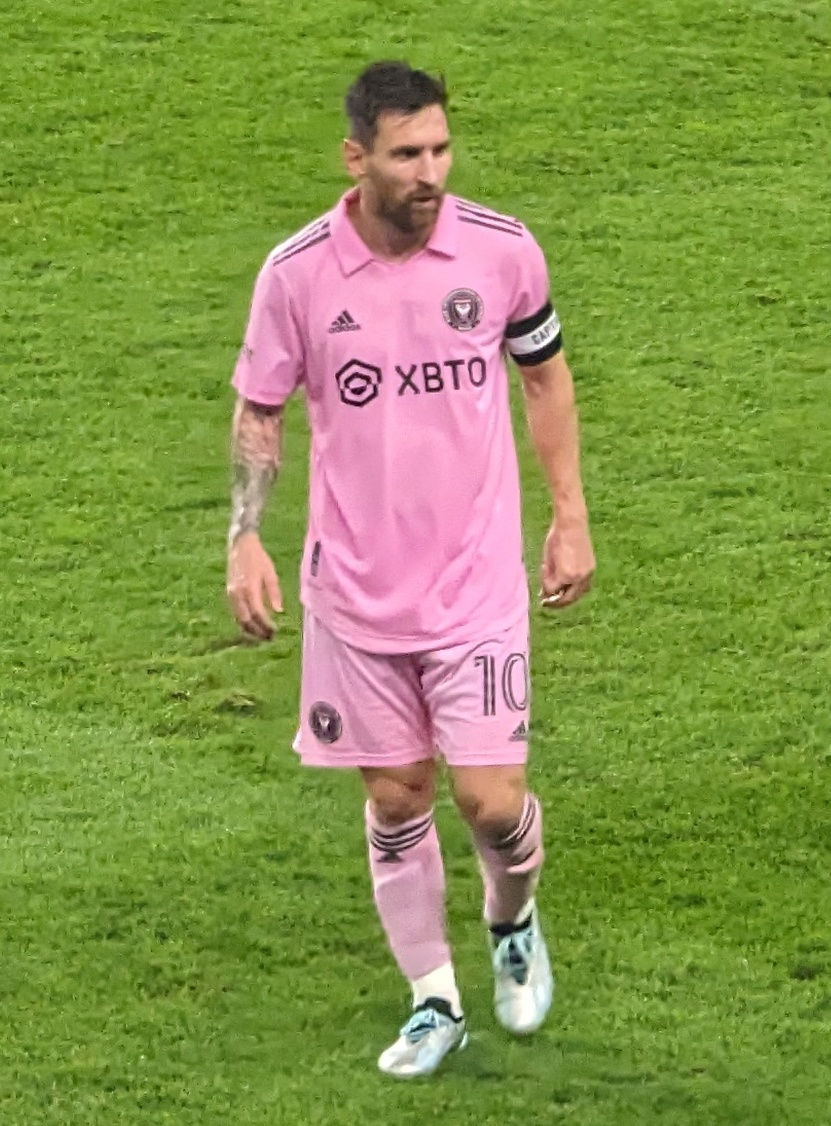
- Lionel Messi, The Best FIFA Men's Player 2023
- Date: 15 January 2024
- Location: London
- Presented by: FIFA
- Hosted by: Thierry Henry & Reshmin Chowdhury

Highlights
- The Best FIFA Player: Men's: (Argentina) Lionel Messi; Women's: (Spain) Aitana Bonmatí
- The Best FIFA Coach: Men's: (Spain) Pep Guardiola; Women's: (Netherlands) Sarina Wiegman
- The Best FIFA Goalkeeper: Men's: (Brazil) Ederson; Women's: (England) Mary Earps
- FIFA Puskás Award: (Brazil) Guilherme Madruga
- The Best FIFA Special Award: (Brazil) Marta
- Website: fifa.com

The Best FIFA Football Awards 2023 were held on 15 January 2024 in London.

== Winners and nominees ==
=== The Best FIFA Men's Player ===
Twelve players were initially shortlisted on 14 September 2023. The three finalists were revealed on 14 December 2023.

Lionel Messi won the award with 48 scoring points.

The selection criteria for the men's players and coaches was: respective achievements during the period from 19 December 2022 to 20 August 2023.

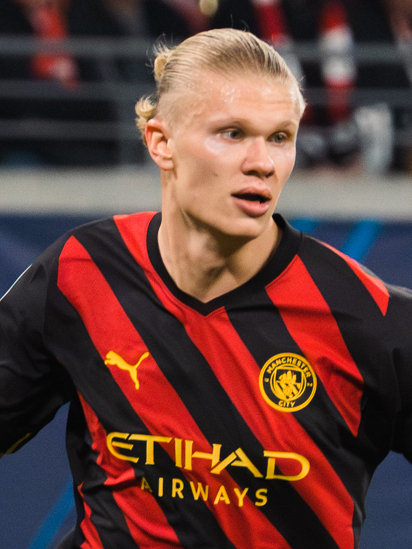
Erling Haaland

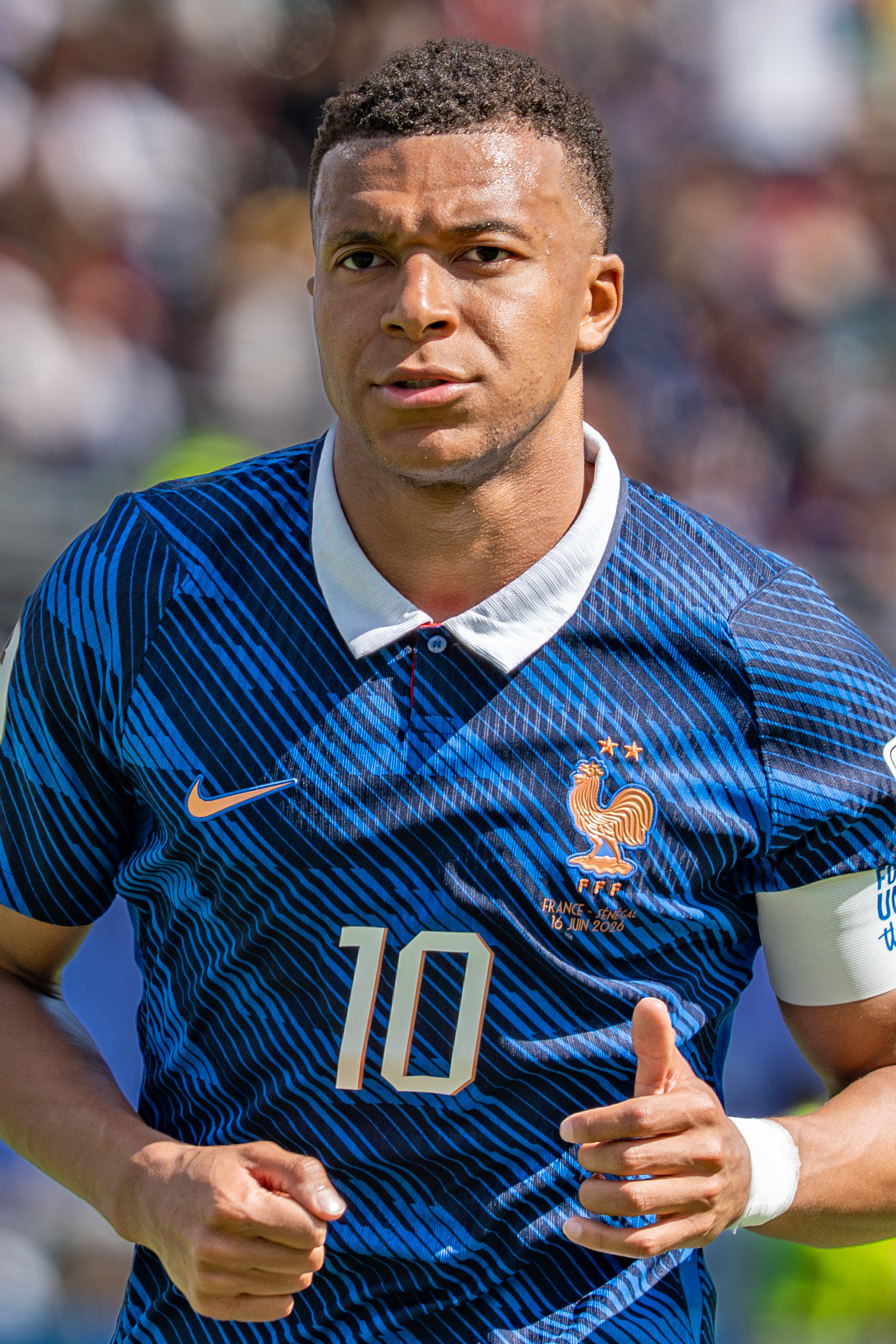
Kylian Mbappé

Rank	Player	Club(s) played for	National team	Points
The finalists
1	Lionel Messi	(France) Paris Saint-Germain; (United States) Inter Miami	Argentina	48* (Note: As per the Rules of Allocation (art. 12), Lionel Messi (Argentina) won the Award on the basis of the votes cast by the men's national-team captains.)
2	Erling Haaland	(England) Manchester City	Norway	48
3	Kylian Mbappé	(France) Paris Saint-Germain	France	35
Other candidates
4	Kevin De Bruyne	(England) Manchester City	Belgium	32
5	Victor Osimhen	(Italy) Napoli	Nigeria	24
6	Rodri	(England) Manchester City	Spain	24
7	Julián Álvarez	(England) Manchester City	Argentina	21
8	Bernardo Silva	(England) Manchester City	Portugal	18
9	İlkay Gündoğan	(England) Manchester City; (Spain) Barcelona	Germany	13
10	Khvicha Kvaratskhelia	(Italy) Napoli	Georgia	7
11	Marcelo Brozović	(Italy) Inter Milan; (Saudi Arabia) Al Nassr	Croatia	7
12	Declan Rice	(England) West Ham United; (England) Arsenal	England	1

=== The Best FIFA Men's Goalkeeper ===
Five players were initially shortlisted on 14 September 2023. The three finalists were revealed on 12 December 2023.

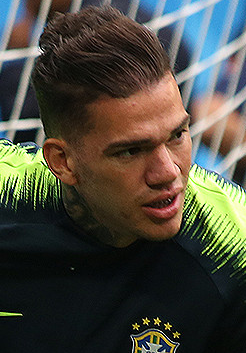
Ederson

Ederson won the award with 23 scoring points.

Rank	Player	Club(s) played for	National team	Points
The finalists
1	Ederson	(England) Manchester City	Brazil	23
2	Thibaut Courtois	(Spain) Real Madrid	Belgium	20
3	Yassine Bounou	(Spain) Sevilla; (Saudi Arabia) Al Hilal	Morocco	16
Other candidates
4	Marc-André ter Stegen	(Spain) Barcelona	Germany	8
5	André Onana	(Italy) Inter Milan; (England) Manchester United	Cameroon	5

=== The Best FIFA Men's Coach ===
Five coaches were initially shortlisted on 14 September 2023. The three finalists were revealed on 13 December 2023.

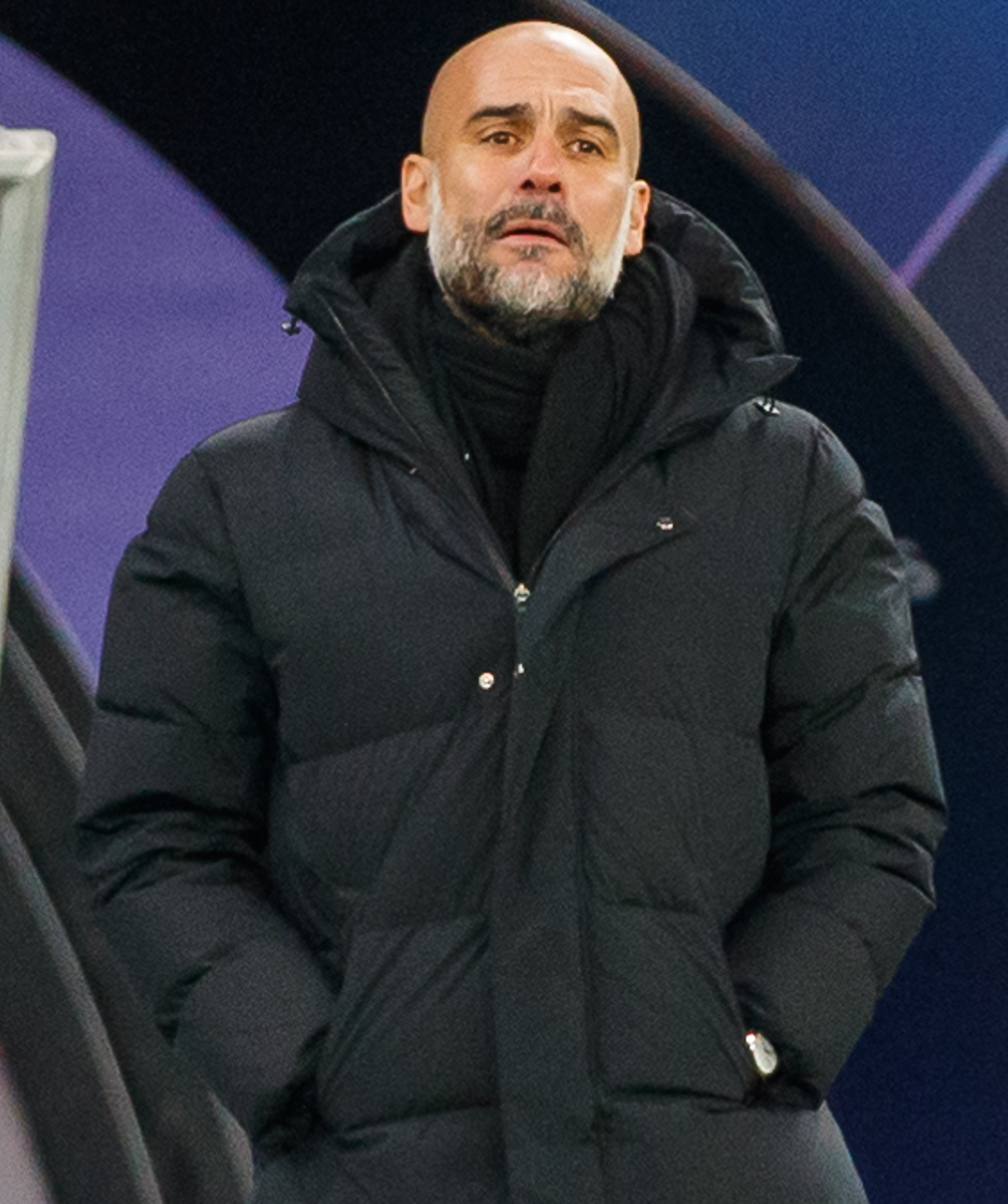
Pep Guardiola

Pep Guardiola won the award with 28 scoring points.

Rank	Coach	Team(s) managed	Points
The finalists
1	(Spain) Pep Guardiola	(England) Manchester City	28
2	(Italy) Luciano Spalletti	(Italy) Napoli; Italy	18
3	(Italy) Simone Inzaghi	(Italy) Inter Milan	11
Other candidates
4	(Spain) Xavi	(Spain) Barcelona	11
5	(Australia) Ange Postecoglou	(Scotland) Celtic; (England) Tottenham Hotspur	4

=== The Best FIFA Women's Player ===
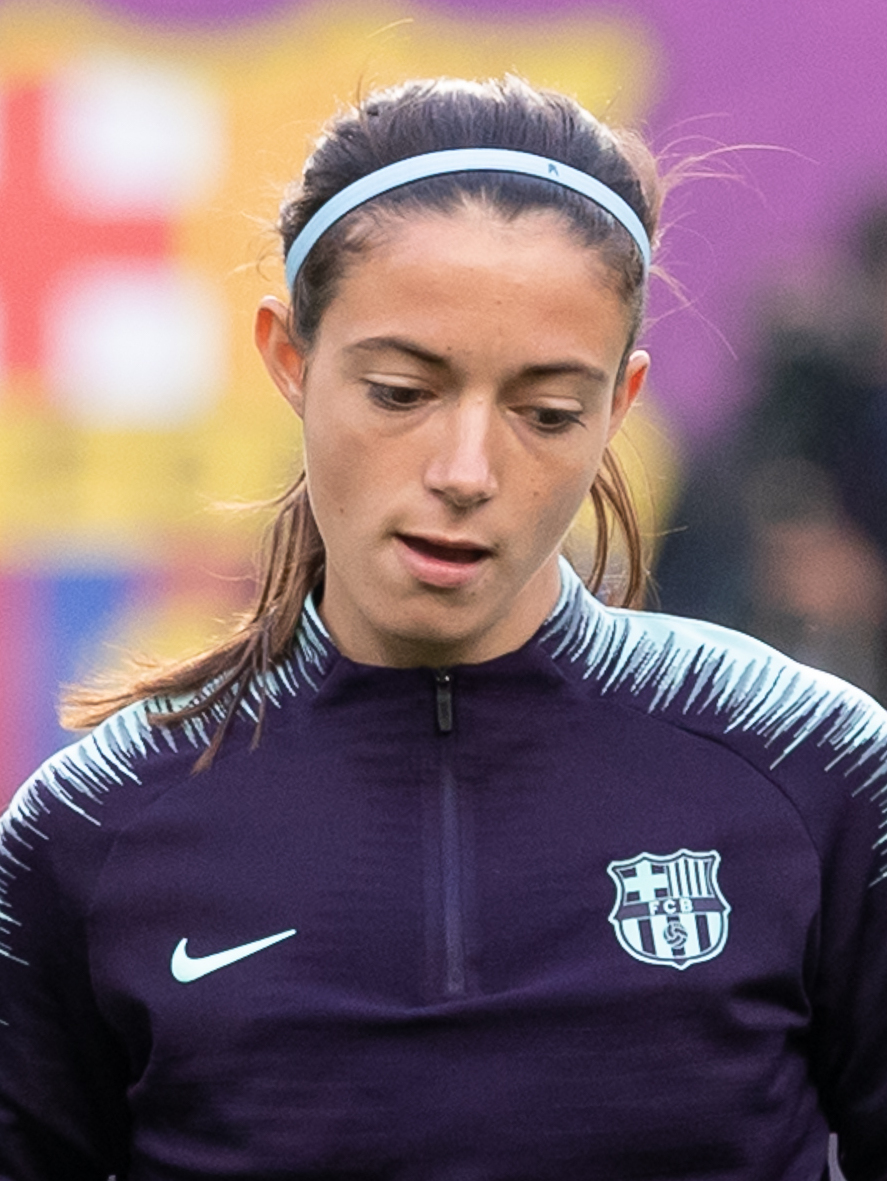
Aitana Bonmatí

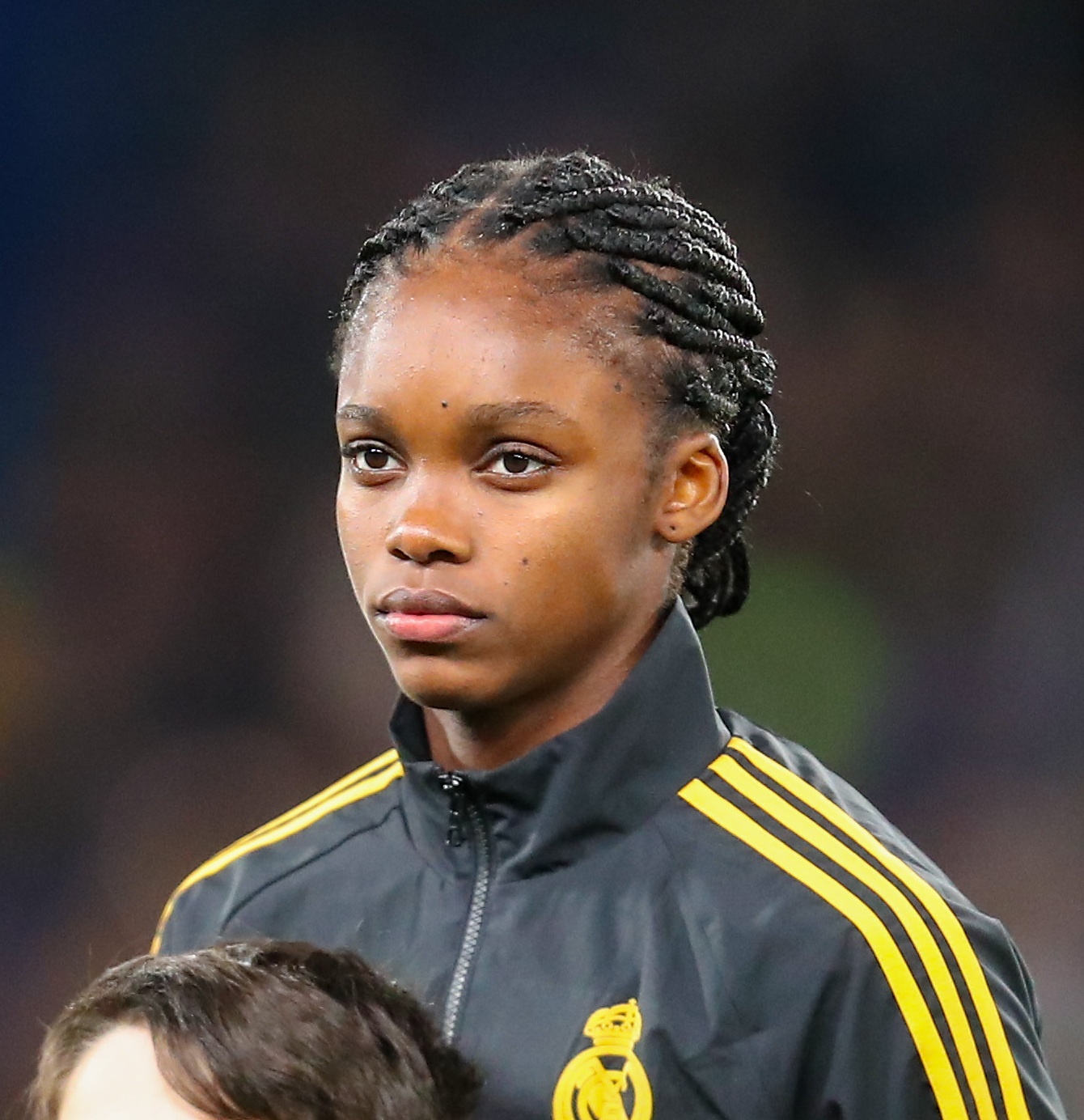
Linda Caicedo

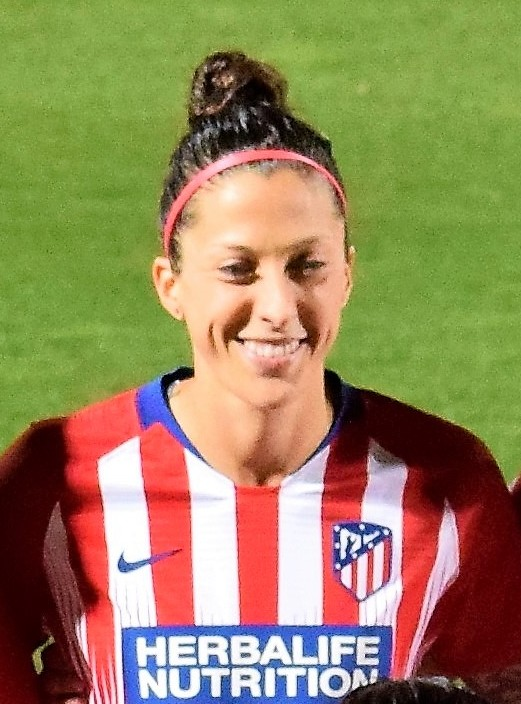
Jenni Hermoso

Sixteen players were initially shortlisted on 14 September 2023. The three finalists were revealed on 14 December 2023.

Aitana Bonmatí won the award with 52 scoring points.

The selection criteria for the women's players and coaches was: respective achievements during the period from 1 August 2022 to 20 August 2023.

Rank	Player	Club(s) played for	National team	Points
The finalists
1	Aitana Bonmatí	(Spain) Barcelona	Spain	52
2	Linda Caicedo	(Colombia) Deportivo Cali; (Spain) Real Madrid	Colombia	40
3	Jenni Hermoso	(Mexico) Pachuca	Spain	36
Other candidates
4	Salma Paralluelo	(Spain) Barcelona	Spain	32
5	Sam Kerr	(England) Chelsea	Australia	32
6	Lauren James	(England) Chelsea	England	18
7	Rachel Daly	(England) Aston Villa	England	15
8	Hinata Miyazawa	(Japan) MyNavi Sendai	Japan	13
9	Keira Walsh	(England) Manchester City; (Spain) Barcelona	England	11
10	Kadidiatou Diani	(France) Paris Saint-Germain	France	10
11	Mapi León	(Spain) Barcelona	Spain	10
12	Alex Greenwood	(England) Manchester City	England	5
13	Lindsey Horan	(France) Lyon	United States	2
14	Mary Fowler	(England) Manchester City	Australia	0
15	Amanda Ilestedt	(France) Paris Saint-Germain	Sweden	0
16	Caitlin Foord	(England) Arsenal	Australia	0

=== The Best FIFA Women's Goalkeeper ===
Seven players were initially shortlisted on 14 September 2023. The three finalists were revealed on 12 December 2023.

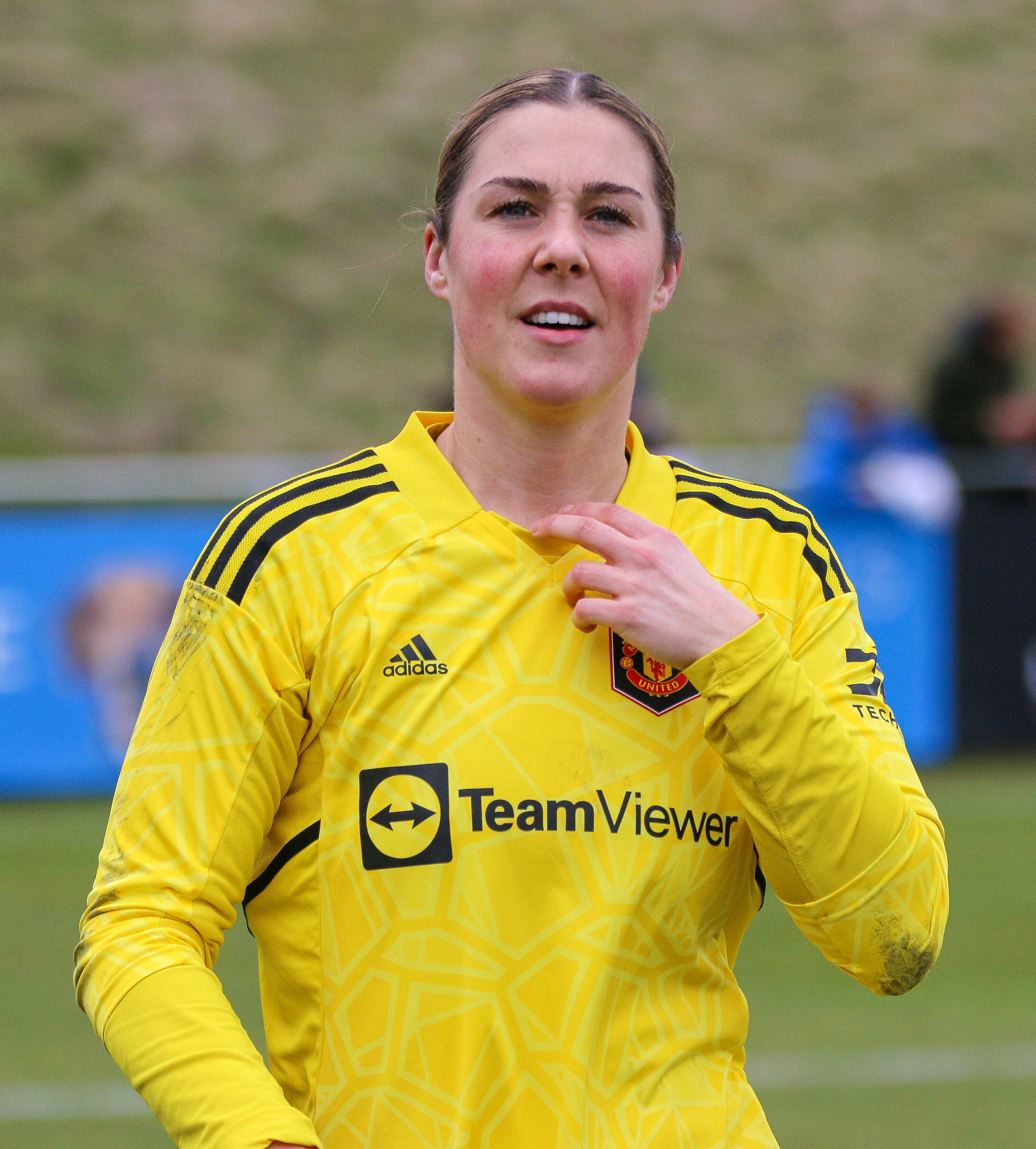
Mary Earps

Mary Earps won the award with 28 scoring points.

Rank	Player	Club(s) played for	National team	Points
The finalists
1	Mary Earps	(England) Manchester United	England	28
2	Cata Coll	(Spain) Barcelona	Spain	14
3	Mackenzie Arnold	(England) West Ham United	Australia	12
Other candidates
4	Zećira Mušović	(England) Chelsea	Sweden	10
5	Sandra Paños	(Spain) Barcelona	Spain	5
6	Christiane Endler	(France) Lyon	Chile	2
7	Ann-Katrin Berger	(England) Chelsea	Germany	1

=== The Best FIFA Women's Coach ===
Six coaches were initially shortlisted on 14 September 2023. The three finalists were revealed on 13 December 2023.

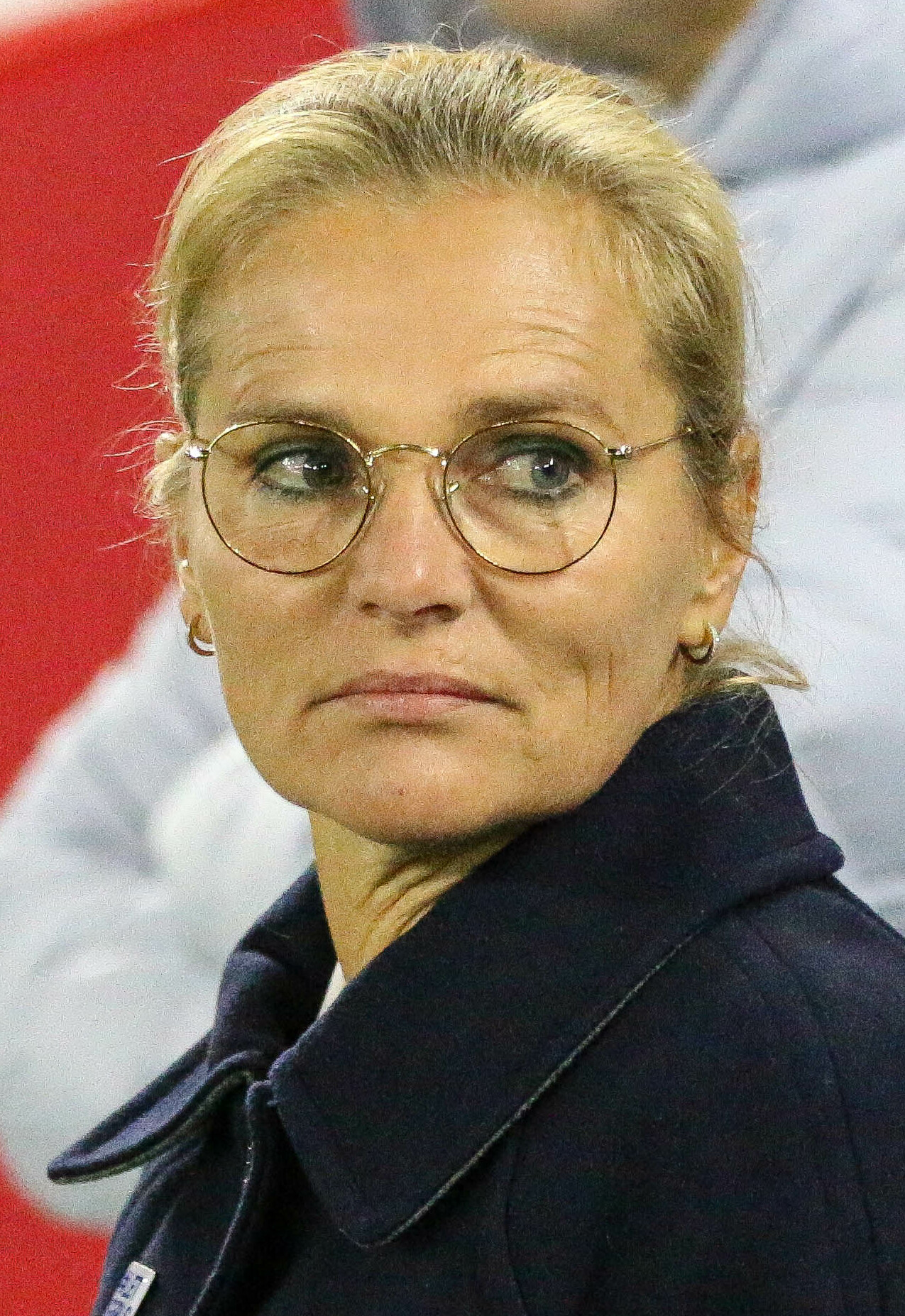
Sarina Wiegman

Sarina Wiegman won the award with 28 scoring points.

Rank	Coach	Team(s) managed	Points
The finalists
1	(Netherlands) Sarina Wiegman	England	28
2	(England) Emma Hayes	(England) Chelsea	18
3	(Spain) Jonatan Giráldez	(Spain) Barcelona	14
Other candidates
4	(Sweden) Peter Gerhardsson	Sweden	7
5	(Sweden) Tony Gustavsson	Australia	5

=== FIFA Puskás Award ===
The eleven players initially shortlisted for the award were announced on 22 September 2023. The three finalists were revealed on 14 December 2023. All goals up for consideration were scored from 19 December 2022 to 20 August 2023.

Guilherme Madruga won the award with 22 scoring points.

Rank	Player	Match	Competition	Date	Points
The finalists
1	(Brazil) Guilherme Madruga	Novorizontino – Botafogo-SP	2023 Campeonato Brasileiro Série B	27 June 2023	22
2	(Portugal) Nuno Santos	Sporting CP – Boavista	2022–23 Primeira Liga	12 March 2023	18
3	(Paraguay) Julio Enciso	Brighton & Hove Albion – Manchester City	2022–23 Premier League	24 May 2023	17
Other candidates
Unranked	(Argentina) Álvaro Barreal	FC Cincinnati – Pittsburgh Riverhounds	2023 U.S. Open Cup	6 June 2023	N/A
Unranked	(Colombia) Linda Caicedo	Colombia – Germany	2023 FIFA Women's World Cup	30 July 2023	N/A
Unranked	(South Korea) Kang Seong-jin	Jordan U-20 – South Korea U-20	2023 AFC U-20 Asian Cup	5 March 2023	N/A
Unranked	(Australia) Sam Kerr	Australia – England	2023 FIFA Women's World Cup	16 August 2023	N/A
Unranked	(Uruguay) Brian Lozano	Atlas – América	2022–23 Liga MX Clausura	26 February 2023	N/A
Unranked	(Spain) Iván Morante	Ibiza – Burgos	2022–23 Segunda División	25 March 2023	N/A
Unranked	(Kazakhstan) Askhat Tagybergen	Kazakhstan – Denmark	UEFA Euro 2024 qualifying	26 March 2023	N/A
Unranked	(Brazil) Bia Zaneratto	Brazil – Panama	2023 FIFA Women's World Cup	24 July 2023	N/A

=== FIFA Fan Award ===
The award celebrated the best fan moments or gestures of August 2022 to August 2023, regardless of championship, gender or nationality. The shortlist was compiled by a panel of FIFA experts.

Colón de Santa Fe fan Hugo Daniel "Toto" Iniguez won the award with 264,591 registered votes.

Rank	Fan(s)	Reason	Votes	% of total votes
Nominees
1	(Argentina) Hugo Daniel Iñiguez, Colón fan	The TV cameras panned in on a Colón fan who was cradling his son in his arms while feeding him his bottle during the team's Argentinian top-tier encounter against Barracas Central. The heart-warming scene reflected the supporter's will to kindle a passion for the club in his son from the earliest age.	264,591	36.5%
2	(Colombia) Miguel Ángel, Millonarios fan	Colombian youngster, who was a big Millonarios fan, fulfilled his final wish before being euthanised due to an unknown illness. On the eve of his passing, the fanatical fan got to meet the members of the first-team squad ahead of their league clash against Alianza Petrolera.	253,167	35%
3	(Australia) Fran Hurndall	Dribbling a football for an average of 32 km a day for 32 days from the Gold Coast to Sydney, the challenge undertaken by Fran Hurndall aimed to inspire women and girls in sport to dare to dream and fulfil their potential at all levels, on and off the pitch, while her 1,000 km run raised money for the Women Sport Australia charity.	206,553	28.5%

=== FIFA Fair Play Award ===
Winner	Reason
Brazil national team	In a friendly against Guinea in June 2023, the Seleção swapped their traditional yellow jerseys for an all-black kit in an anti-racism statement.

=== The Best FIFA Special Award ===
An additional award was given to Brazilian female footballer Marta, to recognize her role and contribution to the sport of football. FIFA also announced the introduction of a new award starting from 2025, to honour her achievements and role in women's football. The best goal scored in women’s football would receive the Marta Award.

Winner	Reason
(Brazil) Marta	Special recognition for her role in women's football.

=== FIFA FIFPRO Men's World 11 ===
The 23–player men's shortlist was announced on 3 January 2024.

The players chosen were Thibaut Courtois as goalkeeper, Kyle Walker, Rúben Dias and John Stones as defenders, Kevin De Bruyne, Bernardo Silva and Jude Bellingham as midfielders, and Lionel Messi, Vinícius Júnior, Erling Haaland and Kylian Mbappé as forwards.

2023 FIFA FIFPRO Men's World 11

Player	Club(s)
Goalkeeper
(Belgium) Thibaut Courtois	(Spain) Real Madrid
Defenders
(England) Kyle Walker	(England) Manchester City
(Portugal) Rúben Dias	(England) Manchester City
(England) John Stones	(England) Manchester City
Midfielders
(Portugal) Bernardo Silva	(England) Manchester City
(Belgium) Kevin De Bruyne	(England) Manchester City
(England) Jude Bellingham	(Germany) Borussia Dortmund; (Spain) Real Madrid
Forwards
(Brazil) Vinícius Júnior	(Spain) Real Madrid
(Norway) Erling Haaland	(England) Manchester City
(France) Kylian Mbappé	(France) Paris Saint-Germain
(Argentina) Lionel Messi	(France) Paris Saint-Germain; (United States) Inter Miami

Other nominees

Player	Club(s)
Goalkeepers
(Brazil) Ederson	(England) Manchester City
(Argentina) Emiliano Martínez	(England) Aston Villa
Defenders
(Netherlands) Virgil van Dijk	(England) Liverpool
(Brazil) Éder Militão	(Spain) Real Madrid
(Germany) Antonio Rüdiger	(Spain) Real Madrid
Midfielders
(Germany) İlkay Gündoğan	(England) Manchester City; (Spain) Barcelona
(Croatia) Luka Modrić	(Spain) Real Madrid
(Spain) Rodri	(England) Manchester City
(Uruguay) Federico Valverde	(Spain) Real Madrid
Forwards
(France) Karim Benzema	(Spain) Real Madrid; (Saudi Arabia) Al Ittihad
(England) Harry Kane	(England) Tottenham Hotspur; (Germany) Bayern Munich
(Portugal) Cristiano Ronaldo	(Saudi Arabia) Al Nassr

=== FIFA FIFPRO Women's World 11 ===
The 23–player women's shortlist was announced on 3 January 2024.

The players chosen were Mary Earps as goalkeeper, Lucy Bronze, Olga Carmona and Alex Greenwood as defenders, Aitana Bonmatí, Ella Toone and Keira Walsh as midfielders, and Lauren James, Sam Kerr, Alex Morgan and Alessia Russo as forwards (a different formation was used in media releases and in video at the ceremony, with Russo and James placed in the midfield).

2023 FIFA FIFPRO Women's World 11

Player	Club(s)
Goalkeeper
(England) Mary Earps	(England) Manchester United
Defenders
(England) Lucy Bronze	(Spain) Barcelona
(Spain) Olga Carmona	(Spain) Real Madrid
(England) Alex Greenwood	(England) Manchester City
Midfielders
(Spain) Aitana Bonmatí	(Spain) Barcelona
(England) Ella Toone	(England) Manchester United
(England) Keira Walsh	(Spain) Barcelona
Forwards
(England) Lauren James	(England) Chelsea
(Australia) Sam Kerr	(England) Chelsea
(United States) Alex Morgan	(United States) San Diego Wave
(England) Alessia Russo	(England) Manchester United; (England) Arsenal

Other nominees

Player	Club(s)
Goalkeepers
(Australia) Mackenzie Arnold	(England) West Ham United
(United States) Alyssa Naeher	(United States) Chicago Red Stars
Defenders
(Sweden) Amanda Ilestedt	(France) Paris Saint-Germain; (England) Arsenal
(Canada) Ashley Lawrence	(France) Paris Saint-Germain; (England) Chelsea
(Spain) Mapi León	(Spain) Barcelona
(Spain) Irene Paredes	(Spain) Barcelona
Midfielders
(Spain) Clàudia Pina	(Spain) Barcelona
(Sweden) Fridolina Rolfö	(Spain) Barcelona
(England) Georgia Stanway	(Germany) Bayern Munich
Forwards
(Spain) Jenni Hermoso	(Mexico) Pachuca; (Mexico) UANL
(Spain) Salma Paralluelo	(Spain) Barcelona
(Germany) Alexandra Popp	(Germany) VfL Wolfsburg
