= List of OL Lyonnes seasons =

This is a list of seasons played by seven-time European champion and fifteen-time French champion Olympique Lyonnais Féminin, a women's football club. The team was created in 1970 and was FC Lyon's women's section for over three decades before switching to Olympique Lyonnais starting from the 2004–05 season.

== Key ==
- R16 = Round of 16
- QF = Quarter-finals
- SF = Semi-finals
- RU = Runners-up (cup competitions)
- W = Winners
- 2nd = Runners-up (in the league)
- 1st = Champions

== Seasons ==
List of seasons, including league division and statistics, cup results and league top scorer
Season	League									Cup	Europe		League top scorer(s) (Note: Only includes goals scored in Division 1 Féminine.)	
Season	Division	Pld	W	D	L	GF	GA	Pts	Pos	Cup	Competition	Result	Player(s)	Goals
2004–05	Division 1	22	15	2	5	50	20	69	3rd	RU	—	—	Séverine Creuzet-Laplantes	13
2005–06	Division 1	22	10	8	4	34	12	60	3rd	RU	—	—	Sandrine Brétigny	11
2006–07	Division 1	22	20	1	1	116	19	83	1st	RU	—	—	Sandrine Brétigny	42
2007–08	Division 1	22	18	4	0	93	4	80	1st	W	UEFA Women's Cup	SF	Sandrine Brétigny	25
2008–09	Division 1	22	21	1	0	114	11	86	1st	SF	UEFA Women's Cup	SF	Kátia Cilene Teixeira	27
2009–10	Division 1	22	18	2	2	93	11	78	1st	SF	Champions League	RU	Kátia Cilene Teixeira	17
2010–11	Division 1	22	22	0	0	106	6	88	1st	QF	Champions League	W	Sandrine Brétigny	19
2011–12	Division 1	22	19	3	0	119	3	82	1st	W	Champions League	W	Eugénie Le Sommer	22
2012–13	Division 1	22	22	0	0	132	5	88	1st	W	Champions League	RU	Lotta Schelin	24
2013–14	Division 1	22	21	0	1	95	12	85	1st	W	Champions League	R16	Eugénie Le Sommer; Laëtitia Tonazzi	15
2014–15	Division 1	22	22	0	0	147	4	88	1st	W	Champions League	R16	Lotta Schelin	34
2015–16	Division 1	22	19	3	0	115	4	82	1st	W	Champions League	W	Ada Hegerberg	33
2016–17	Division 1	22	21	0	1	103	6	63 (Note: The 2016–17 season saw the introduction of three points for a win instead of four, one point for a draw instead of two, and no points for loss instead of one.)	1st	W	Champions League	W	Ada Hegerberg; Eugénie Le Sommer	20
2017–18	Division 1	22	21	1	0	104	5	64	1st	RU	Champions League	W	Ada Hegerberg	31
2018–19	Division 1	22	20	2	0	89	6	62	1st	W	Champions League	W	Ada Hegerberg	20
2019–20	Division 1	16	14	2	0	67	4	44	1st (Note: The season was abandoned after 16 match days due to the COVID-19 pandemic. Lyon were declared champions.)	W	Champions League	W	Ada Hegerberg	14
2020–21	Division 1	22	20	1	1	78	6	61	2nd	DNF	Champions League	QF	Nikita Parris	13
2021–22	Division 1	22	21	1	0	79	8	64	1st	R16	Champions League	W	Catarina Macario	14
2022–23	Division 1	22	20	1	1	69	9	61	1st	W	Champions League	QF	Signe Bruun	8
2023–24	Division 1	22	20	1	1	82	13	61	1st	W	Champions League	RU	Ada Hegerberg	12
2024–25	Première Ligue	22	20	2	0	99	8	62	1st	R32	Champions League	SF	Melchie Dumornay	17
2025–26	Première Ligue	22	19	3	0	76	11	60	1st	W	Champions League	RU	Tabitha Chawinga	12
