= List of Canada national rugby union team test matches =

A list of all international tests and other matches played by the Canada national rugby union team.

Legend
Green background indicates a win.
Red background indicates a loss.
Yellow background indicates a draw.
Italics indicate a non-test match.

== 2020 to 2029 ==
2026 Results (4 Wins - 4 Losses - 1 Draw)
Date	Competition	Venue	Opponent	Score
November 20, 2026	Nations Cup	Arcul de Triumf Stadium, Bucharest, Romania	Romania	27-26
November 14, 2026	Nations Cup	Chambéry Savoie Stadium, Chambéry, France	Hong Kong	38-17
November 7, 2026	Nations Cup	Avchala Stadium, Tbilisi, Georgia	Georgia	59–14
September 19, 2026	Pacific Nations Cup	Chichibunomiya Rugby Stadium, Tokyo, Japan	United States	19–16
September 12, 2026	Pacific Nations Cup	Hanazono Rugby Stadium, Higashiōsaka, Japan	Fiji	45–29
September 5, 2026	Test match	Denka Big Swan Stadium, Niigata, Japan	Japan	57–12
July 18, 2026	Nations Cup	Princess Auto Stadium, Winnipeg	Zimbabwe	23–19
July 11, 2026	Nations Cup	Clarke Stadium, Edmonton	Portugal	14–38
July 4, 2026	Nations Cup	Clarke Stadium, Edmonton	Spain	42–42

2025 Results (1 Win - 8 Losses)
Date	Competition	Venue	Opponent	Score
November 22, 2025	Canada tour of Europe	Estádio Cidade de Coimbra, Coimbra, Portugal	Portugal	27-33
November 15, 2025	Canada tour of Europe	Adjarabet Arena, Batumi, Georgia	Georgia	17-38
November 8, 2025	Canada tour of Europe	Arcul de Triumf Stadium, Bucharest, Romania	Romania	21-31
September 20, 2025	Pacific Nations Cup/RWC qualification	America First Field, Salt Lake City, USA	Tonga	24-35
September 14, 2025	Pacific Nations Cup/RWC qualification	Dick's Sporting Goods Park, Denver, USA	Fiji	10-63
August 30, 2025	Pacific Nations Cup/RWC qualification	Yurtec Stadium, Sendai, Japan	Japan	15-57
August 22, 2025	Pacific Nations Cup/RWC qualification	McMahon Stadium, Calgary	United States	34-20
July 18, 2025	Mid-year rugby union tests	Clarke Stadium, Edmonton	Spain	23-24
July 12, 2025	Mid-year rugby union tests	Clarke Stadium, Edmonton	Belgium	18-25

2024 Results (1 Win - 6 Losses)
Date	Competition	Venue	Opponent	Score
November 16, 2024	Canada tour of Romania	Arcul de Triumf Stadium, Bucharest, Romania	Romania	27-35
November 9, 2024	Canada tour of Romania	Arcul de Triumf Stadium, Bucharest, Romania	Chile	14-44
September 14, 2024	Pacific Nations Cup	Prince Chichibu Memorial Stadium, Tokyo, Japan	Tonga	17-30
August 31, 2024	Pacific Nations Cup	Dignity Health Sports Park, Carson, California, USA	United States	15-28
August 25, 2024	Pacific Nations Cup	BC Place, Vancouver	Japan	28-55
July 12, 2024	Mid-year rugby union tests	TD Place Stadium, Ottawa	Romania	35-22
July 6, 2024	Mid-year rugby union tests	TD Place Stadium, Ottawa	Scotland	12-73

2023 Results (1 Win - 3 Losses)
Date	Competition	Venue	Opponent	Score
November 18, 2023	La Vila International Cup	Villajoyosa, Spain	Brazil	40-15
November 11, 2023	La Vila International Cup	Villajoyosa, Spain	Spain	42-20
August 15, 2023	RWC warm-up match	Teufaiva Sport Stadium, Nukuʻalofa, Tonga	Tonga	36-12
August 10, 2023	RWC warm-up match	Teufaiva Sport Stadium, Nukuʻalofa, Tonga	Tonga	28-7

2022 Results (2 Wins – 2 Losses)
Date	Competition	Venue	Opponent	Score
November 19, 2022	End of year tests	NRCA Stadium, Amsterdam, Netherlands	Namibia	43-37
November 12, 2022	End of year tests	NRCA Stadium, Amsterdam, Netherlands	Netherlands	37-25
July 10, 2022	July Tests	TD Place Stadium, Ottawa	Spain	57-34
July 2, 2022	July Tests	Wanderers Grounds, Halifax	Belgium	45-0

2021 Results (3 Wins – 5 Losses)
Date	Competition	Venue	Opponent	Score
November 13, 2021	End-of-year internationals	Sportscentrum Nelson Mandela, Brussels, Belgium	Belgium	24-0
November 6, 2021	End-of-year internationals	CAR Rugby do Jamor, Lisbon, Portugal	Portugal	20-17
9 October 2021	2023 RWC qualification	Estadio Elías Figueroa	Chile	33-24
October 2, 2021	2023 RWC qualification	Westhills Stadium, Langford, British Columbia	Chile	22-21
September 11, 2021	2023 RWC qualification	Infinity Park, Glendale, Colorado, United States	United States	38-16
September 4, 2021	2023 RWC qualification	Swiler's Rugby Club, St. John’s, Newfoundland and Labrador	United States	34-21
July 10, 2021	Mid-year rugby union internationals	Twickenham Stadium, Twickenham, England	England	70-14
July 3, 2021	Mid-year rugby union internationals	Principality Stadium, Cardiff, Wales	Wales	68-12

2020 Results (0 Wins – 0 Losses)
Date	Competition	Venue	Opponent	Score
October 30, 2020	End-of-year internationals	BC Place, Vancouver	United States	cancelled
September 12, 2020	Americas Rugby Championship	Uruguay	Uruguay	cancelled
September 5, 2020	Americas Rugby Championship	Argentina	Argentina XV	cancelled
August 29, 2020	Americas Rugby Championship	Canada	Chile	cancelled
August 22, 2020	Americas Rugby Championship	Canada	Brazil	cancelled
August 15, 2020	Americas Rugby Championship	United States	United States	cancelled
July 4, 2020	July tests	Montreal	(France) French Barbarians	cancelled

== 2010 to 2019 ==
2019 Results (2 Wins – 12 Losses – 1 Cancellation)
Date	Competition	Venue	Opponent	Score
October 13, 2019	Rugby World Cup	Kamaishi Recovery Memorial Stadium, Kamaishi, Japan	Namibia	0-0 (cancelled)
October 8, 2019	Rugby World Cup	Kobe Misaki Stadium, Kobe, Japan	South Africa	66-7
October 2, 2019	Rugby World Cup	Ōita Stadium, Ōita, Japan	New Zealand	63-0
September 26, 2019	Rugby World Cup	Fukuoka Hakatanomori Stadium, Fukuoka, Japan	Italy	48-7
September 7, 2019	RWC warm-up match	BC Place, Vancouver	United States	20-15
August 30, 2019	RWC warm-up match	Westhills Stadium, Langford	(Canada) BC All-Stars	45-13
August 24, 2019	RWC warm-up match	Tim Hortons Field, Hamilton	(Ireland) Leinster Rugby	38-35
August 9, 2019	Pacific Nations Cup	Churchill Park, Lautoka, Fiji	Tonga	33-23
August 3, 2019	Pacific Nations Cup	ANZ National Stadium, Suva, Fiji	Fiji	38-13
July 27, 2019	Pacific Nations Cup	Infinity Park, Glendale, Colorado, United States	United States	47-19
March 8, 2019	Americas Rugby Championship	Starfire Sports Stadium, Tukwila, Washington, United States	United States	30-25
March 1, 2019	Americas Rugby Championship	Westhills Stadium, Langford	Argentina XV	39-23
February 22, 2019	Americas Rugby Championship	Westhills Stadium, Langford	Chile	56-0
February 9, 2019	Americas Rugby Championship	Estádio Martins Pereira, São José dos Campos, Brazil	Brazil	18-10
February 2, 2019	Americas Rugby Championship	Estadio Charrúa, Montevideo, Uruguay	Uruguay	20-17

2018 Results (7 Wins – 7 Losses)
Date	Competition	Venue	Opponent	Score
November 23, 2018	Rugby World Cup qualification match	Pierre-Delort Stadium, Marseille, France	Hong Kong	27-10
November 17, 2018	Rugby World Cup qualification match	Pierre-Delort Stadium, Marseille, France	Germany	29-10
November 11, 2018	Rugby World Cup qualification match	Pierre-Delort Stadium, Marseille, France	Kenya	65-19
November 5, 2018	End-of-year international	Butts Park Arena, Coventry	(England) Coventry	35-12
October 31, 2018	End-of-year international	Iffley Road, Oxford, England	(England) Oxford University RFC	26-20
June 23, 2018	2018 June rugby union test	Wanderers Grounds, Halifax	United States	42-17
June 16, 2018	2018 June rugby union test	Twin Elm Rugby Park, Ottawa	Russia	43-20
June 9, 2018	Douglas Horn Trophy	Commonwealth Stadium, Edmonton	Scotland	48-10
March 3, 2018	Americas Rugby Championship	Estadio La Portada, La Serena, Chile	Chile	33-17
February 24, 2018	Americas Rugby Championship	Gimnasia y Esgrima, Jujuy, Argentina	Argentina XV	40-15
February 17, 2018	Americas Rugby Championship	Westhills Stadium, Langford	Brazil	45-5
February 10, 2018	Americas Rugby Championship	Papa Murphy's Park, Sacramento, California, United States	United States	29-10
February 3, 2018	Rugby World Cup qualification match Americas Rugby Championship	Estadio Charrúa, Montevideo, Uruguay	Uruguay	32-31
January 27, 2018	Rugby World Cup qualification match Americas Rugby Championship	BC Place, Vancouver	Uruguay	38-29

2017 Results (2 Wins – 10 Losses – 1 Draw)
Date	Competition	Venue	Opponent	Score
November 25, 2017	End-of-year international	Parc des Sports et de l'Amitié, Narbonne, France	Fiji	57-17
November 18, 2017	End-of-year international	Estadio Nacional Complutense, Madrid, Spain	Spain	37-27
November 11, 2017	End-of-year international	Mikheil Meskhi Stadium, Tbilisi, Georgia	Georgia	54-22
November 3, 2017	End-of-year international	BC Place, Vancouver	Māori All Blacks	51-9
July 1, 2017	Rugby World Cup qualification match	Torero Stadium, San Diego, California, United States	United States	52-16
June 24, 2017	Rugby World Cup qualification match	Tim Hortons Field, Hamilton	United States	28-28
June 17, 2017	Mid-year international	Ellerslie Rugby Park, Edmonton	Romania	25-9
June 10, 2017	Mid-year international	Calgary Rugby Park, Calgary	Georgia	13-0
March 4, 2017	Americas Rugby Championship	Pacaembu Stadium, São Paulo, Brazil	Brazil	23-24
February 25, 2017	Americas Rugby Championship	Estadio Domingo Burgueno, Maldonado, Uruguay	Uruguay	13-17
February 18, 2017	Americas Rugby Championship	Swangard Stadium, Burnaby	United States	34-51
February 11, 2017	Americas Rugby Championship	Westhills Stadium, Langford	Chile	36-15
February 4, 2017	Americas Rugby Championship	Westhills Stadium, Langford	Argentina XV	20-6

2016 Results (4 Wins – 7 Losses)
Date	Competition	Venue	Opponent	Score
November 25, 2016	End-of-year international	Stade des Alpes, Grenoble, France	Samoa	25-23
November 19, 2016	End-of-year international	Stadionul Arcul de Triumf, Bucharest, Romania	Romania	21-16
November 12, 2016	End-of-year international	Aviva Stadium, Dublin, Ireland	Ireland	52-21
June 26, 2016	Mid-year international	BMO Field, Toronto	Italy	20-18
June 18, 2016	Mid-year international	Calgary Rugby Park, Calgary	Russia	46-21
June 11, 2016	Mid-year international	BC Place, Vancouver	Japan	26-22
March 6, 2016	Americas Rugby Championship	Estadio San Carlos de Apoquindo, Santiago, Chile	Chile	64-13
February 27, 2016	Americas Rugby Championship	Duendes Rugby Club, Rosario, Argentina	Argentina XV	54-21
February 20, 2016	Americas Rugby Championship	Westhills Stadium, Langford	Brazil	52-25
February 13, 2016	Americas Rugby Championship	Dell Diamond, Round Rock, Texas, United States	United States	30-22
February 6, 2016	Americas Rugby Championship	Westhills Stadium, Langford	Uruguay	33-17

2015 Results (2 Wins – 10 Losses)
Date	Competition	Venue	Opponent	Score
October 6, 2015	Rugby World Cup	Leicester City Stadium, Leicester, England	Romania	17-15
October 1, 2015	Rugby World Cup	Stadium mk, Milton Keynes, England	France	41-18
September 26, 2015	Rugby World Cup	Elland Road, Leeds, England	Italy	23-18
September 19, 2015	Rugby World Cup	Millennium Stadium, Cardiff, Wales	Ireland	50-7
September 6, 2015	RWC warm-up match	Twickenham Stoop, London, England	Fiji	47-18
September 2, 2015	RWC warm-up match	Molesey Road, Esher, England	Georgia	16-15
August 29, 2015	RWC warm-up match	Graves-Oakley Memorial Park, Halifax	(Scotland) Glasgow Warriors	19-12
August 22, 2015	RWC warm-up match	Twin Elm Rugby Park, Ottawa	United States	41-23
August 3, 2015	Pacific Nations Cup	Swangard Stadium, Burnaby	United States	15-13
July 29, 2015	Pacific Nations Cup	BMO Field, Toronto	Samoa	21-20
July 24, 2015	Pacific Nations Cup	Swangard Stadium, Burnaby	Tonga	28-18
July 18, 2015	Pacific Nations Cup	Avaya Stadium, San Jose, California, USA	Japan	20-6

2014 Results (1 Win – 6 Losses)
Date	Competition	Venue	Opponent	Score
November 22, 2014	End-of-year international	Stadionul Arcul de Triumf, Bucharest, Romania	Romania	18-9
November 14, 2014	End-of-year international	Stade de la Rabine, Vannes, France	Samoa	23-13
November 7, 2014	End-of-year international	Eirias Stadium, Colwyn Bay, Wales	Namibia	17-13
November 2, 2014	End-of-year international	Sixways Stadium, Worcester, England	(England) RFU Championship XV	28-23
June 21, 2014	Pacific Nations Cup	Cal Expo Facility, Sacramento, California, United States	United States	38-35
June 14, 2014	Douglas Horn Trophy	BMO Field, Toronto	Scotland	19-17
June 7, 2014	Pacific Nations Cup	Swangard Stadium, Burnaby	Japan	34-25

2013 Results (6 Wins – 5 Losses)
Date	Competition	Venue	Opponent	Score
November 23, 2013	End-of-year international	Estádio Universitário de Lisboa, Lisbon, Portugal	Portugal	52-8
November 16, 2013	End-of-year international	Stadionul Arcul de Triumf, Bucharest, Romania	Romania	21-20
November 9, 2013	End-of-year international	Dinamo Arena, Tbilisi, Georgia	Georgia	19-15
November 2, 2013	End-of-year international	BMO Field, Toronto	Māori All Blacks	40-15
August 24, 2013	Rugby World Cup qualification match	BMO Field, Toronto	United States	13-11
August 17, 2013	Rugby World Cup qualification match	Blackbaud Stadium, Charleston, South Carolina, United States	United States	27-9
June 19, 2013	Pacific Nations Cup	Mizuho Rugby Stadium, Nagoya, Japan	Japan	16-13
June 15, 2013	Mid-year international	BMO Field, Toronto	Ireland	14-40
June 8, 2013	Pacific Nations Cup	Richardson Memorial Stadium, Kingston	Tonga	36-27
June 5, 2013	Pacific Nations Cup	Twin Elm Rugby Park, Ottawa	Fiji	20-18
May 25, 2013	Pacific Nations Cup	Ellerslie Rugby Park, Edmonton	United States	16-9

2012 Results (3 Wins – 3 Losses)
Date	Competition	Venue	Opponent	Score
November 23, 2012	End-of-year international	Oxford University Sports Centre, Oxford, England	Māori All Blacks	32-19
November 17, 2012	International Rugby Series	Eirias Stadium, Colwyn Bay, Wales	Russia	35-3
November 9, 2012	International Rugby Series	Eirias Stadium, Colwyn Bay, Wales	Samoa	42-12
June 23, 2012	Mid-year international	Swangard Stadium, Burnaby	Georgia	31-12
June 15, 2012	Mid-year international	BMO Field, Toronto	Italy	25-16
June 9, 2012	Mid-year international	Richardson Memorial Stadium, Kingston	United States	28-25

2011 Results (5 Wins – 4 Losses – 1 Draw)
Date	Competition	Venue	Opponent	Score
October 2, 2011	Rugby World Cup	Regional Stadium, Wellington, New Zealand	New Zealand	79-15
September 27, 2011	Rugby World Cup	McLean Park, Napier, New Zealand	Japan	20-20
September 18, 2011	Rugby World Cup	McLean Park, Napier, New Zealand	France	46-19
September 14, 2011	Rugby World Cup	Northland Events Centre, Whangārei, New Zealand	Tonga	25-20
August 26, 2011	RWC warm-up match	Skilled Park, Gold Coast, Australia	(Australia) Australian Barbarians	38–14
August 13, 2011	RWC warm-up match	Infinity Park, Glendale, Colorado, United States	United States	27–7
August 6, 2011	RWC warm-up match	BMO Field, Toronto	United States	28–22
June 18, 2011	Churchill Cup	Sixways Stadium, Worcester, England	England A	37–6
June 8, 2011	Churchill Cup	Molesey Road, Esher, England	Russia	34–18
June 4, 2011	Churchill Cup	Franklin's Gardens, Northampton, England	Italy A	26–12

2010 Results (5 Wins – 2 Losses)
Date	Competition	Venue	Opponent	Score
November 27, 2010	End-of-year international	Estádio Universitário de Lisboa, Lisbon, Portugal	Portugal	23-20
November 20, 2010	End-of-year international	Boris Paichadze National Stadium, Tbilisi, Georgia	Georgia	22-15
November 13, 2010	End-of-year international	Estadio Nacional Complutense, Madrid, Spain	Spain	60-22
November 6, 2010	End-of-year international	King Baudouin Stadium, Brussels, Belgium	Belgium	43-12
June 19, 2010	Churchill Cup	Red Bull Arena, Harrison, New Jersey, United States	England A	38–18
June 13, 2010	Churchill Cup	Infinity Park, Glendale, Colorado, United States	France A	33–27
June 5, 2010	Churchill Cup	Infinity Park, Glendale, Colorado, United States	Uruguay	48–6

== 2000 to 2009 ==
2009 Results (3 Wins – 7 Losses)
Date	Competition	Venue	Opponent	Score
November 28, 2009	End-of-year international	Swangard Stadium, Burnaby	Russia	22-6
November 21, 2009	End-of-year international	Prince Chichibu Memorial Ground, Tokyo, Japan	Japan	27-6
November 15, 2009	End-of-year international	Yurtec Stadium Sendai, Miyagi, Japan	Japan	46-8
July 11, 2009	Rugby World Cup qualification match	Ellerslie Rugby Park, Edmonton	United States	41-18
July 4, 2009	Rugby World Cup qualification match	Blackbaud Stadium, Charleston, South Carolina, United States	United States	12-6
June 21, 2009	Churchill Cup	Dick's Sporting Goods Park, Commerce City, Colorado, United States	Argentina XV	44-29
June 10, 2009	Churchill Cup	Infinity Park, Glendale, Colorado, United States	Ireland Wolfhounds	30-19
June 6, 2009	Churchill Cup	Infinity Park, Glendale, Colorado, United States	Georgia	42-10
May 30, 2009	Mid-year international	York Stadium, Toronto	Wales	32-23
May 23, 2009	Mid-year international	Thunderbird Stadium, Vancouver	Ireland	25-6

2008 Results (2 Wins – 6 Losses)
Date	Competition	Venue	Opponent	Score
November 21, 2008	Douglas Horn Trophy	Pittodrie Stadium, Aberdeen, Scotland	Scotland	41-0
November 14, 2008	End-of-year international	Millennium Stadium, Cardiff, Wales	Wales	34-13
November 8, 2008	End-of-year international	Thomond Park, Limerick, Ireland	Ireland	55-0
November 1, 2008	End-of-year international	Estádio Universitário de Lisboa, Lisbon, Portugal	Portugal	21-13
June 28, 2008		Bullen Park, Esquimalt	(France) French Barbarians	17-7
June 21, 2008	Churchill Cup	Toyota Park, Chicago, United States	United States	26-10
June 14, 2008	Churchill Cup	Fletcher's Fields, Markham	Argentinian XV	17-16
June 7, 2008	Churchill Cup	Twin Elm Rugby Park, Ottawa	Scotland A	24-10

2007 Results (2 Wins – 6 Losses – 1 Draw)
Date	Competition	Venue	Opponent	Score
September 29, 2007	Rugby World Cup	Stade Chaban-Delmas, Bordeaux, France	Australia	37-6
September 25, 2007	Rugby World Cup	Stade Chaban-Delmas, Bordeaux, France	Japan	12-12
September 16, 2007	Rugby World Cup	Millennium Stadium, Cardiff, Wales	Fiji	29-16
September 9, 2007	Rugby World Cup	Stade de la Beaujoire, Nantes, France	Wales	42-17
August 18, 2007	RWC warm-up match	Twin Elm Rugby Park, Ottawa	Portugal	42-12
June 16, 2007	Mid-year international	Waikato Stadium, Hamilton, New Zealand	New Zealand	64-13
June 2, 2007	Churchill Cup	Twickenham Stadium, London	United States	52-10
May 25, 2007	Churchill Cup	Franklin's Gardens, Northampton, England	Māori	59-23
May 19, 2007	Churchill Cup	Sandy Park, Exeter, England	Ireland A	39-20

2006 Results (3 Wins – 4 Losses)
Date	Competition	Venue	Opponent	Score
November 25, 2006	End-of-year international	Stadio Pordenone, Fontanafredda, Italy	Italy	41-6
November 17, 2006	End-of-year international	Millennium Stadium, Cardiff, Wales	Wales	61-26
August 12, 2006	Rugby World Cup qualification match	Swilers Rugby Park, St. John's	United States	56-7
June 24, 2006	Rugby World Cup qualification match	Bridgetown, Barbados	Barbados	69-3
June 17, 2006	Churchill Cup	Commonwealth Stadium, Edmonton	United States	33-18
June 10, 2006	Churchill Cup	York Stadium, Toronto	England A	41-11
June 7, 2006	Churchill Cup	Twin Elm Rugby Park, Ottawa	Scotland A	15-10

2005 Results (3 Wins – 5 Losses)
Date	Competition	Venue	Opponent	Score
November 19, 2005	End-of-year international	Stadionul Ghencea, Bucharest, Romania	Romania	22-20
November 12, 2005	End-of-year international	Stade Marcel Saupin, Nantes, France	France	50-6
July 2, 2005	Mid-year international	Calgary Rugby Park, Calgary	Argentina	22-15
June 26, 2005	Churchill Cup	Commonwealth Stadium, Edmonton	United States	20-19
June 19, 2005	Churchill Cup	Commonwealth Stadium, Edmonton	England A	29-5
June 11, 2005	Mid-year international	York Stadium, Toronto	Wales	60-3
May 29, 2005	Super Cup	Chichibunomiya Stadium, Tokyo, Japan	Japan	15-10
May 25, 2005	Super Cup	Olympic Stadium, Tokyo, Japan	United States	30-26

2004 Results (2 Wins – 5 Losses)
Date	Competition	Venue	Opponent	Score
November 13, 2004	End-of-year international	Twickenham, London, England	England	70-0
November 6, 2004	End-of-year international	Stadio Tommaso Fattori, L'Aquila, Italy	Italy	51-6
July 10, 2004	Mid-year international	York Stadium, Toronto	France	47-13
June 21, 2004	Churchill Cup	Commonwealth Stadium, Edmonton	United States	32-29
June 14, 2004	Churchill Cup	Calgary Rugby Park, Calgary	England A	48-23
May 30, 2004	Super Cup	Chichibunomiya Stadium, Tokyo, Japan	Japan	34-21
May 27, 2004	Super Cup	Olympic Stadium, Tokyo, Japan	United States	23-20

2003 Results (2 Wins – 9 Losses)
Date	Competition	Venue	Opponent	Score
October 29, 2003	Rugby World Cup	WIN Stadium, Wollongong, Australia	Tonga	24-7
October 21, 2003	Rugby World Cup	Canberra Stadium, Canberra, Australia	Italy	19-14
October 17, 2003	Rugby World Cup	Telstra Dome, Melbourne, Australia	New Zealand	68-6
October 12, 2003	Rugby World Cup	Telstra Dome, Melbourne, Australia	Wales	41-10
August 30, 2003	Pan American Championship	Buenos Aires Cricket Club Ground, Buenos Aires, Argentina	Argentina	62-22
August 27, 2003	Pan American Championship	Club Atlético San Isidro Ground, Buenos Aires, Argentina	United States	35-20
August 23, 2003	Pan American Championship	Buenos Aires Cricket Club Ground, Buenos Aires, Argentina	Uruguay	21-11
August 2, 2003	Mid-year international	York Stadium, Toronto	Māori All Blacks	30-9
July 26, 2003	Mid-year international	Calgary Rugby Park, Calgary	Māori All Blacks	65-27
June 18, 2003	Churchill Cup	Thunderbird Stadium, Vancouver	United States	16-11
June 14, 2003	Churchill Cup	Thunderbird Stadium, Vancouver	England A	43-7

2002 Results (6 Wins – 3 Losses)
Date	Competition	Venue	Opponent	Score
November 23, 2002	End-of-year international	Stade de France, Paris, France	France	35-3
November 16, 2002	End-of-year international	Millennium Stadium, Cardiff, Wales	Wales	32-21
August 31, 2002	Rugby World Cup qualification match	Prince of Wales Cricket Club, Santiago, Chile	Chile	29-11
August 24, 2002	Rugby World Cup qualification match	Estadio Saroldi, Montevideo, Uruguay	Uruguay	25-23
August 17, 2002	Rugby World Cup qualification match	Calgary Rugby Club, Calgary	Chile	27-6
August 10, 2002	Rugby World Cup qualification match	Ellerslie Park, Edmonton	Uruguay	51-16
July 13, 2002	Rugby World Cup qualification match	Rockne Stadium, Chicago, Illinois, United States	United States	36-13
June 29, 2002	Rugby World Cup qualification match	Fletcher's Field, Markham	United States	26-9
June 15, 2002	Scotland tour of North America	Thunderbird Stadium, Vancouver	Scotland	26-23

2001 Results (2 Wins – 5 Losses)
Date	Competition	Venue	Opponent	Score
July 7, 2001	Pacific Rim Rugby Championship	Chichibunomiya Rugby Stadium, Tokyo, Japan	Japan	39-7
July 4, 2001	Pacific Rim Rugby Championship	Ajinomoto Stadium, Tokyo, Japan	Fiji	52-23
June 9, 2001	England tour of North America	Swangard Stadium, Burnaby	England	59-20
June 2, 2001	England tour of North America	Fletcher's Fields, Markham	England	22-10
May 26, 2001	PARA Pan American Championship	Fletcher's Fields, Markham	Argentina	20-6
May 23, 2001	PARA Pan American Championship	Mohawk Sports Park, Hamilton	Uruguay	14-8
May 19, 2001	PARA Pan American Championship	Richardson Memorial Stadium, Kingston	United States	19-10

2000 Results (3 Wins – 4 Losses – 1 Draw)
Date	Competition	Venue	Opponent	Score
November 11, 2000	Canada tour of Italy	Stadio Comunale Mario Battaglini, Rovigo, Italy	Italy	22-17
July 15, 2000	Pacific Rim Rugby Championship	Fletcher's Fields, Markham	Japan	62-18
July 7, 2000	Pacific Rim Rugby Championship	Apia Park, Apia, Samoa	Fiji	42-11
July 1, 2000	Pacific Rim Rugby Championship	Apia Park, Apia, Samoa	Samoa	41-22
June 17, 2000	Ireland tour of the Americas	Fletcher's Fields, Markham	Ireland	27-27
June 10, 2000	Canada tour of South Africa	Buffalo City Stadium, East London, South Africa	South Africa	51-18
June 3, 2000	Pacific Rim Rugby Championship	Manchester, New Hampshire, United States	United States	34-25
May 20, 2000	Pacific Rim Rugby Championship	Thunderbird Stadium, Vancouver	Tonga	26-23

== 1990 to 1999 ==
1999 Results (1 Win – 9 Losses)
Date	Competition	Venue	Opponent	Score
October 14, 1999	Rugby World Cup	Stade de Toulouse, Toulouse, France	Namibia	72-11
October 9, 1999	Rugby World Cup	Parc Lescure, Bordeaux, France	Fiji	38-22
October 2, 1999	Rugby World Cup	Stade de la Méditerranée, Béziers, France	France	33-20
August 28, 1999	RWC warm-up match	Twickenham Stadium, London, England	England	36-11
August 21, 1999	RWC warm-up match	Millennium Stadium, Cardiff, Wales	Wales	33-19
July 5, 1999	Pacific Rim Rugby Championship	Teufaiva Stadium, Nuku'alofa, Tonga	Tonga	18-10
June 19, 1999	Pacific Rim Rugby Championship	Fletcher's Field, Markham	United States	18-17
May 29, 1999	Pacific Rim Rugby Championship	Thunderbird Stadium, Vancouver	Samoa	17-13
May 15, 1999	Pacific Rim Rugby Championship	Thunderbird Stadium, Vancouver	Fiji	40-29
May 1, 1999	Pacific Rim Rugby Championship	Chichibunomiya Rugby Stadium, Tokyo, Japan	Japan	23-21

1998 Results (7 Wins – 2 Losses)
Date	Competition	Venue	Opponent	Score
August 22, 1998	Rugby World Cup qualification match	Buenos Aires Cricket Club Ground, Buenos Aires, Argentina	Argentina	54-28
August 18, 1998	Rugby World Cup qualification match	Club Atlético San Isidro Ground, Buenos Aires, Argentina	United States	31-14
August 15, 1998	Rugby World Cup qualification match	Buenos Aires Cricket Club Ground, Buenos Aires, Argentina	Uruguay	38-15
June 20, 1998	Pacific Rim Rugby Championship	Thunderbird Stadium, Vancouver	Japan	34-25
June 13, 1998	Pacific Rim Rugby Championship	Shawnigan Lake	Hong Kong	38-12
June 6, 1998	Pacific Rim Rugby Championship	Burlington, Vermont, United States	United States	37-3
May 23, 1998	Pacific Rim Rugby Championship	Thunderbird Stadium, Vancouver	United States	17-15
May 9, 1998	Pacific Rim Rugby Championship	Aberdeen Stadium, Hong Kong	Hong Kong	23-17
May 3, 1998	Pacific Rim Rugby Championship	Chichibunomiya Rugby Stadium, Tokyo, Japan	Japan	30-22

1997 Results (5 Wins – 3 Losses)
Date	Competition	Venue	Opponent	Score
November 30, 1997	Canada tour of Ireland	Lansdowne Road, Dublin, Ireland	Ireland	33-11
July 19, 1997	Wales tour	Fletcher's Fields, Markham	Wales	28-25
June 28, 1997	Pacific Rim Rugby Championship	Boxer Stadium, San Francisco, California, United States	United States	22-11
June 14, 1997	Pacific Rim Rugby Championship	Thunderbird Stadium, Vancouver	Japan	42-18
June 7, 1997	Pacific Rim Rugby Championship	Thunderbird Stadium, Vancouver	Hong Kong	17-16
May 24, 1997	Pacific Rim Rugby Championship	Aberdeen Stadium, Hong Kong	Hong Kong	35-27
May 18, 1997	Pacific Rim Rugby Championship	Chichibunomiya Rugby Stadium, Tokyo, Japan	Japan	32-31
May 10, 1997	Pacific Rim Rugby Championship	Thunderbird Stadium, Vancouver	United States	53-12

1996 Results (7 Wins – 3 Losses)
Date	Competition	Venue	Opponent	Score
September 21, 1996	PARA Pan American Championship	Fletcher's Fields, Markham	Argentina	41-21
September 18, 1996	PARA Pan American Championship	Mohawk Sports Park, Hamilton	United States	23-18
September 14, 1996	PARA Pan American Championship	Twin Elm Rugby Park, Nepean	Uruguay	24-18
July 13, 1996	Pacific Rim Rugby Championship	Thunderbird Stadium, Vancouver	Japan	51-30
July 6, 1996	Pacific Rim Rugby Championship	Thunderbird Stadium, Vancouver	Hong Kong	57-9
June 29, 1996		Ballymore Stadium, Brisbane, Australia	Australia	74-9
June 9, 1996	Pacific Rim Rugby Championship	Chichibunomiya Rugby Stadium, Tokyo, Japan	Japan	45-18
June 1, 1996	Pacific Rim Rugby Championship	Aberdeen Stadium, Hong Kong	Hong Kong	18-12
May 18, 1996	Pacific Rim Rugby Championship	Thunderbird Stadium, Vancouver	United States	24-20
May 18, 1996	Pacific Rim Rugby Championship	Boxer Stadium, San Francisco, California, United States	United States	19-12

1995 Results (3 Wins – 6 Losses)
Date	Competition	Venue	Opponent	Score
September 9, 1995		Fletcher's Fields, Markham	United States	15-14
June 3, 1995	Rugby World Cup	Boet Erasmus Stadium, Port Elizabeth, South Africa	South Africa	20-0
May 31, 1995	Rugby World Cup	Boet Erasmus Stadium, Port Elizabeth, South Africa	Australia	27-11
May 26, 1995	Rugby World Cup	Boet Erasmus Stadium, Port Elizabeth, South Africa	Romania	34-3
April 22, 1995	Canada tour of Fiji and New Zealand	Eden Park, Auckland, New Zealand	New Zealand	73-7
April 8, 1995	Canada tour of Fiji and New Zealand	Prince Charles Park, Nadi, Fiji	Fiji	22-10
March 10, 1995	PARA Pan American Championship	Ferro Caril Oeste, Buenos Aires, Argentina	Argentina	29-26
March 7, 1995	PARA Pan American Championship	Estadio Luis Franzini, Montevideo, Uruguay	Uruguay	28-9
January 21, 1995		Murrayfield, Edinburgh, Scotland	Scotland	22-6

1994 Results (2 Wins – 3 Losses)
Date	Competition	Venue	Opponent	Score
December 17, 1994	Canada tour of England and France	Stade Léo Lagrange, Besançon, France	France	28-9
December 10, 1994	Canada tour of England and France	Twickenham Stadium, London, England	England	60-19
June 11, 1994	Wales tour of Canada and Oceania	Fletcher's Fields, Markham	Wales	33-15
June 5, 1994	France tour of Canada and New Zealand	Twin Elm Rugby Park, Nepean	France	18-16
May 21, 1994		George Allen Field, Long Beach, California, United States	United States	15-10

1993 Results (3 Wins – 2 Losses)
Date	Competition	Venue	Opponent	Score
November 10, 1993		National Stadium, Cardiff, Wales	Wales	26-24
October 9, 1993	Australia tour	Calgary	Australia	43-16
June 19, 1993		Winnipeg	United States	20-9
June 5, 1993	England tour of Canada	Twin Elm Rugby Park, Nepean	England	19-14
May 29, 1993	England tour of Canada	Swangard Stadium, Burnaby	England	15-12

1992 Results (1 Win – 1 Loss)
Date	Competition	Venue	Opponent	Score
October 17, 1992		Wembley Stadium, London, England	England	26-13
June 13, 1992		Denver, Colorado, United States	United States	32-9

1991 Results (5 Wins – 2 Losses)
Date	Competition	Venue	Opponent	Score
October 20, 1991	Rugby World Cup Quarter Final	Stadium Lille Métropole, Villeneuve-d'Ascq, France	New Zealand	29-13
October 13, 1991	Rugby World Cup	Stade Armandie, Agen, France	France	19-13
October 9, 1991	Rugby World Cup	Stade Ernest-Wallon, Toulouse, France	Romania	19-11
October 5, 1991	Rugby World Cup	Stade Jean Dauger, Bayonne, France	Fiji	13-3
June 8, 1991		Calgary	United States	34-15
May 25, 1991		Saint John	Scotland XV	24-19
May 11, 1991		Thunderbird Stadium, Vancouver	Japan	49-26

1990 Results (2 Wins – 1 Loss)
Date	Competition	Venue	Opponent	Score
June 16, 1990	Rugby World Cup qualification match	José Amalfitani Stadium, Buenos Aires, Argentina	Argentina	19-15
June 9, 1990	Rugby World Cup qualification match	Chief Sealth, Seattle, Washington, United States	United States	14-12
March 30, 1990	Rugby World Cup qualification match	Sports Complex, Burnaby	Argentina	15-6

== 1980 to 1989 ==
1989 Results (1 Win – 1 Loss)
Date	Competition	Venue	Opponent	Score
September 23, 1989	Rugby World Cup qualification match	Varsity Stadium, Toronto	United States	21-3
September 2, 1989	Ireland tour of North America	Royal Athletic Park, Victoria	Ireland XV	24-21

1988 Results (0 Wins – 1 Loss)
Date	Competition	Venue	Opponent	Score
June 11, 1988		Saranac Lake, New York, United States	United States	28-16

1987 Results (3 Wins – 2 Losses)
Date	Competition	Venue	Opponent	Score
November 14, 1987		Royal Athletic Park, Victoria	United States	20-12
June 3, 1987	Rugby World Cup	Rugby Park Stadium, Invercargill, New Zealand	Wales	40-9
May 30, 1987	Rugby World Cup	Carisbrook, Dunedin, New Zealand	Ireland	46-19
May 24, 1987	Rugby World Cup	McLean Park, Napier, New Zealand	Tonga	37-4
May 10, 1987		Thunderbird Stadium, Vancouver	United States	33-9

1986 Results (1 Win – 1 Loss)
Date	Competition	Venue	Opponent	Score
November 8, 1986		Tucson, Arizona, United States	United States	27-16
August 21, 1986	French Tour	Agen, France	SU Agen	23-6
August 18, 1986	French Tour	Brive, France	CA Brive	12-6
August 17, 1986	French Tour	Toulouse, France	Stade Toulousain	17-10
June 7, 1986	Japan tour of North America	Sports Complex, Burnaby	Japan	26-21

1985 Results (1 Win – 2 Losses)
Date	Competition	Venue	Opponent	Score
November 16, 1985		Brockton Oval, Vancouver	United States	21-10
June 23, 1985	Canada tour of Australia	Ballymore Stadium, Brisbane	Australia	43-15
June 15, 1985	Canada tour of Australia	Sydney Cricket Ground, Sydney	Australia	59-3

1984 Results (0 Wins – 1 Loss)
Date	Competition	Venue	Opponent	Score
June 9, 1984		Rockne Stadium, Chicago, United States	United States	21-13

1983 Results (2 Wins – 2 Losses)
Date	Competition	Venue	Opponent	Score
October 15, 1983	Canada tour of England	Twickenham Stadium, London	England XV	27-0
July 1, 1983	Italy tour of Canada and U.S.A.	Varsity Stadium, Toronto	Italy	37-9
June 25, 1983	Italy tour of Canada and U.S.A.	Sports Complex, Burnaby	Italy	19-13
June 11, 1983		Sports Complex, Burnaby	United States	15-9

1982 Results (0 Wins – 3 Losses – 1 Draw)
Date	Competition	Venue	Opponent	Score
June 12, 1982		Bleeker Stadium, Albany, New York, United States	United States	3-3
May 29, 1982	England tour of Canada and the United States	Swangard Stadium, Burnaby	England XV	43-6
April 18, 1982	Canada tour of Japan	Prince Chichibu Memorial Stadium, Tokyo, Japan	Japan	16-6
April 11, 1982	Canada tour of Japan	Hanazono Rugby Stadium, Osaka, Japan	Japan	24-18

1980 Results (1 Win – 2 Losses)
Date	Competition	Venue	Opponent	Score
October 11, 1980	New Zealand tour of North America and Wales	Sports Complex, Burnaby	New Zealand XV	43-10
June 8, 1980		Saranac Lake, New York, United States	United States	16-0
May 24, 1980	Wales B tour in North America	Sports Complex, Burnaby	Wales B	24-7

== 1932 to 1979 ==
1979 Results (1 Win – 1 Loss)
Date	Competition	Venue	Opponent	Score
September 29, 1979	Canada tour of England, Wales and France	Stade Charléty, Paris, France	France A	34-15
June 9, 1979		Toronto	United States	19-12

1978 Results (0 Wins – 2 Losses)
Date	Competition	Venue	Opponent	Score
September 30, 1978	France tour of Far East and Canada	Calgary	France XV	24-9
May 28, 1978		Baltimore, Maryland, United States	United States	12-7

1977 Results (1 Win – 2 Losses)
Date	Competition	Venue	Opponent	Score
June 11, 1977		Varsity Stadium, Toronto	England U23	29-9
June 4, 1977		Lansdowne Park, Ottawa	England U23	26-13
May 21, 1977		Sports Complex, Burnaby	United States	17-6

1976 Results (0 Wins – 1 Loss)
Date	Competition	Venue	Opponent	Score
June 12, 1976		York Stadium, Toronto	Barbarians	29-4

1974 Results (0 Wins – 1 Loss)
Date	Competition	Venue	Opponent	Score
October 25, 1974		Thunderbird Stadium, Vancouver	Tonga	40-14

1973 Results (0 Wins – 1 Loss)
Date	Competition	Venue	Opponent	Score
June 9, 1973		Toronto	Wales XV	58-20

1971 Results (0 Wins – 1 Loss)
Date	Competition	Venue	Opponent	Score
October 2, 1971		Cardiff Arms Park, Cardiff, Wales	Wales XV	56-10

1970 Results (0 Wins – 1 Loss)
Date	Competition	Venue	Opponent	Score
November 28, 1970		Sports Complex, Burnaby	Fiji	35-17

1967 Results (0 Wins – 1 Loss)
Date	Competition	Venue	Opponent	Score
September 30, 1967		Empire Stadium, Vancouver	England XV	29-0

1966 Results (0 Wins – 1 Loss)
Date	Competition	Venue	Opponent	Score
September 17, 1966	British Lions tour to Australia and New Zealand	Stanley Park (Near CNE), Toronto	British Lions	19-8

1962 Results (0 Wins – 1 Loss – 1 Draw)
Date	Competition	Venue	Opponent	Score
November 17, 1962		County Grounds, Gosforth, England	Barbarians	3-3
December 1, 1962		National Stadium, Cardiff, Wales	Wales U23	8-0

1932 Results (0 Wins – 2 Losses)
Date	Competition	Venue	Opponent	Score
February 11, 1932		Meiji Jingu Stadium, Tokyo, Japan	Japan	38-5
January 31, 1932		Hanazono Field, Osaka, Japan	Japan	9-8

== See also ==
- History of rugby union matches between Canada and Chile
- History of rugby union matches between Canada and France
- History of rugby union matches between Canada and Romania
- History of rugby union matches between Canada and United States
- History of rugby union matches between Canada and Wales
