= History of rugby union matches between Canada and the United States =

Canada and the United States have an international rivalry in rugby union dating back to 1977. Historically, Canada have dominated the rivalry. However, between 2014 and 2024 the United States secured victory in 13 of 15 encounters, a concentration of victories that surpassed their total number of tests wins in the preceding 37 years. Canada won the latest matchup 19–16 in the third place match of the 2026 Pacific Nations Cup.

The first ever match occurred in 1977 at Swangard Stadium in Burnaby, British Columbia, Canada. Canada won the match 17–6. The United States' first win came the following year in Baltimore, Maryland, winning 12–7.

From 2013 to 2015 and in 2019, Canada and the United States played every June in the tournament now known as the Pacific Nations Cup (PNC), along with Japan, Fiji, Tonga, and Samoa. The 2024 World Rugby Pacific Nations Cup saw the return of both the United States and Canada.

== Defunct tournaments ==
In 1996, Canada and United States played in the Pacific-Rim Championship along with Hong Kong and Japan. The 1999 edition saw the addition of Fiji, Samoa and Tonga. The tournament folded in 2001. Alongside the Pacific-Rim Championship, the sides also competed in the Pan-American Championship until 2003.

In 2003 the Super Cup formed and was contested between Japan, Russia and the United States. In 2004 they were joined by Canada. The tournament was only contested for three years before folding in 2005 with Canada the final champions. In 2003, the Churchill Cup began during which Canada and the United States played A sides from Europe and the Southern Hemisphere. The tournament folded in 2011 prior to the 2011 Rugby World Cup.

Between 2016 and 2019, the two countries played in the Americas Rugby Championship (ARC) alongside the senior teams of Brazil, Chile, and Uruguay, plus Argentina's second national side, Argentina XV.

== Summary ==
=== Overview ===
Details	Played	Won by Canada	Won by United States	Drawn	Canada points	United States points
In Canada	36	26	9	1	874	618
In United States	26	10	15	1	514	520
Neutral venue	6	5	1	0	178	124
Overall	68	41	25	2	1,566	1,262

=== Records ===
Note: Date shown in brackets indicates when the record was or last set.

Record	Canada	United States
Longest winning streak	7 (11 July 2009 – 21 June 2014)	6 (1 July 2017 – 4 September 2021)
Most points for
Home	56 (12 August 2006)	52 (1 July 2017)
Away	52 (2 June 2007)	51 (18 February 2017)
Largest winning margin
Home	49 (12 August 2006)	36 (1 July 2017)
Away	42 (2 June 2007)	25 (23 June 2018)

=== Attendance ===
Up to date as of 23 September 2026.

Total attendance*	181,984
Average attendance*	5,868
Highest attendance	15,000; Canada 19–20 United States; 26 June 2005
*Inclusive of 31 matches with a documented attendance and excludes 37 matches in which no attendance was reported

== Results ==
No.	Date	Venue	Score	Winner	Competition	Attendance	Ref.
1	21 May 1977	Swangard Stadium, Burnaby	17–6	Canada	1977 United States tour of Canada	6,000	
2	28 May 1978	Memorial Stadium, Baltimore	12–7	United States	1978 Canada tour of the United States		
3	9 June 1979	Varsity Stadium, Toronto	19–12	Canada	1979 United States tour of Canada		
4	8 June 1980	Saranac Lake Park	0–16	Canada	1980 Canada tour of the United States		
5	6 June 1981	Kingsland, Calgary	6–3	Canada	1981 United States tour of Canada		
6	12 June 1982	Bleecker Stadium, New York	3–3	draw	1982 Canada tour of the United States		
7	11 June 1983	Swangard Stadium, Burnaby	15–9	Canada	1983 United States tour of Canada		
8	9 June 1984	Rockne Stadium, Chicago	21–13	United States	1984 Canada tour of the United States		
9	16 November 1985	Thunderbird Stadium, Vancouver	21–10	Canada	1985 United States tour of Canada		
10	8 November 1986	Arizona Stadium, Tucson	16–27	Canada	1986 Canada tour of the United States	4,500	
11	10 May 1987	Thunderbird Stadium, Vancouver	33–9	Canada	1987 United States tour of Canada I		
12	14 November 1987	Royal Athletic Park, Victoria	20–12	Canada	1987 United States tour of Canada II		
13	11 June 1988	Saranac Lake Park	28–16	United States	1988 Canada tour of the United States		
14	23 September 1989	Varsity Stadium, Toronto	21–3	Canada	1991 Rugby World Cup Qualification		
15	9 June 1990	Chief Sealth, Seattle	14–12	United States	1991 Rugby World Cup Qualification		
16	8 June 1991	Kingsland, Calgary	34–15	Canada	1991 United States tour of Canada		
17	13 June 1992	Observatory Park, Denver	9–32	Canada	1992 Canada tour of the United States		
18	19 June 1993	Winnipeg	20–9	Canada	1993 United States tour of Canada		
19	21 May 1994	George Allen Field, Long Beach	10–15	Canada	1994 Canada tour of the United States		
20	9 September 1995	Fletcher's Fields, Markham	14–15	United States	1995 United States tour of Canada		
21	11 May 1996	Boxer Stadium, San Francisco	19–12	United States	1996 Pacific-Rim Championship	3,500	
22	18 May 1996	Thunderbird Stadium, Vancouver	24–20	Canada	1996 Pacific-Rim Championship		
23	18 September 1996	Mohawk Sports Park, Hamilton	23–18	Canada	1996 Pan-American Championship		
24	10 May 1997	Thunderbird Stadium, Vancouver	53–12	Canada	1997 Pacific-Rim Championship	5,000	
25	28 June 1997	Boxer Stadium, San Francisco, California	11–22	Canada	1997 Pacific-Rim Championship	1,800	
26	23 May 1998	Thunderbird Stadium, Vancouver	17–15	Canada	1998 Pacific-Rim Championship		
27	6 June 1998	Burlington	3–37	Canada	1998 Pacific-Rim Championship	4,300	
28	18 August 1998	Club Atlético San Isidro, Buenos Aires (Argentina)	31–14	Canada	1998 Pan-American Championship	3,000	
29	19 June 1999	Fletcher's Fields, Markham	17–18	United States	1999 Pacific-Rim Championship	4,500	
30	3 June 2000	Singer Family Park, Manchester	34–25	United States	2000 Pacific-Rim Championship		
31	19 May 2001	Richardson Memorial Stadium, Kingston	19–10	Canada	2001 Pan-American Championship	7,155	
32	29 June 2002	Fletcher's Fields, Markham	26–9	Canada	2003 Rugby World Cup Qualification	2,200	
33	13 July 2002	Rockne Stadium, Chicago	13–36	Canada	2003 Rugby World Cup Qualification	2,500	
34	18 June 2003	Thunderbird Stadium, Vancouver	11–16	United States	2003 Churchill Cup	3,200	
35	27 August 2003	José Amalfitani Stadium, Buenos Aires (Argentina)	20–35	United States	2003 Pan-American Championship		
36	27 May 2004	National Olympic Stadium, Tokyo (Japan)	23–20	Canada	2004 Super Cup	3,500	
37	19 June 2004	Commonwealth Stadium, Edmonton	32–29	Canada	2004 Churchill Cup	5,000	
38	25 May 2005	National Olympic Stadium, Tokyo (Japan)	30–26	Canada	2005 Super Cup		
39	26 June 2005	Commonwealth Stadium, Edmonton	19–20	United States	2005 Churchill Cup	15,000	
40	17 June 2006	Commonwealth Stadium, Edmonton	33–18	Canada	2006 Churchill Cup		
41	12 August 2006	Swilers Rugby Park, St. John's	56–7	Canada	2007 Rugby World Cup Qualification	5,000	
42	2 June 2007	Twickenham Stadium, London (England)	52–10	Canada	2007 Churchill Cup		
43	21 June 2008	Toyota Park, Bridgeview	10–26	Canada	2008 Churchill Cup		
44	4 July 2009	Blackbaud Stadium, Charleston	12–6	United States	2011 Rugby World Cup Qualification	3,836	
45	11 July 2009	Ellerslie Rugby Park, Edmonton	41–18	Canada	2011 Rugby World Cup Qualification		
46	6 August 2011	BMO Field, Toronto	28–22	Canada	2011 Rugby World Cup warm-up match	10,621	
47	13 August 2011	Infinity Park, Glendale	7–27	Canada	2011 Rugby World Cup warm-up match	5,000	
48	9 June 2012	Richardson Memorial Stadium, Kingston	28–25	Canada	2012 Summer International	7,521	
49	25 May 2013	Ellerslie Rugby Park, Edmonton	16–9	Canada	2013 Pacific Nations Cup	3,526	
50	17 August 2013	Blackbaud Stadium, Charleston	9–27	Canada	2015 Rugby World Cup Qualification	5,258	
51	24 August 2013	BMO Field, Toronto	13–11	Canada	2015 Rugby World Cup Qualification	10,207	
52	21 June 2014	Cal Expo Facility, Sacramento	38–35	United States	2014 Pacific Nations Cup	7,804	
53	3 August 2015	Swangard Stadium, Burnaby	15–13	United States	2015 Pacific Nations Cup		
54	22 August 2015	Twin Elm Rugby Park, Ottawa	23–41	United States	2015 Rugby World Cup warm-up match	5,168	
55	13 February 2016	Dell Diamond, Round Rock	30–22	United States	2016 Americas Rugby Championship	7,415	
56	18 February 2017	Swangard Stadium, Burnaby	34–51	United States	2017 Americas Rugby Championship	3,416	
57	24 June 2017	Tim Hortons Field, Hamilton	28–28	draw	2019 Rugby World Cup Qualification	13,187	
58	1 July 2017	Torero Stadium, San Diego	52–16	United States	2019 Rugby World Cup Qualification		
59	10 February 2018	Papa Murphy's Park, Sacramento	29–10	United States	2018 Americas Rugby Championship		
60	23 June 2018	Wanderers Grounds, Halifax	17–42	United States	2018 Summer International	6,213	
61	8 March 2019	Starfire Sports, Tukwila	30–25	United States	2019 Americas Rugby Championship		
62	27 July 2019	Infinity Park, Glendale	47–19	United States	2019 Pacific Nations Cup	5,000	
63	7 September 2019	BC Place, Vancouver	15–20	United States	2019 Rugby World Cup warm-up match		
64	4 September 2021	Swiler's Rugby Park, St. John's	34–21	Canada	2023 Rugby World Cup Qualification		
65	11 September 2021	Infinity Park, Glendale	38–16	United States	2023 Rugby World Cup Qualification		
66	31 August 2024	Dignity Health Sports Park, Los Angeles	28–15	United States	2024 Pacific Nations Cup		
67	22 August 2025	McMahon Stadium, Calgary	34–20	Canada	2025 Pacific Nations Cup (Note: The 2025 Pacific Nations Cup doubled as the qualification tournament for the 2027 Rugby World Cup.)	11,587	
68	19 September 2026	Chichibunomiya Rugby Stadium, Tokyo (Japan)	19–16	Canada	2026 Pacific Nations Cup		

== See also ==
- Rugby Americas North
- Americas Rugby Championship
- Rugby World Cup qualification
