= Vaea Anitoni =

Tonga & US international rugby union player

- Born: Vaea Naufahu Anitoni; 20 September 1970 (age 56) Tongatapu, Tonga
- Height: 5 ft 8 in (1.73 m)
- Weight: 170 lb (77 kg)

Rugby union career
- Position: Wing
Amateur team(s)
Years	Team	Apps	(Points)
- San Mateo Rugby Club
Provincial / State sides
Years	Team	Apps	(Points)
1990-1991	ʻEua		
International career
Years	Team	Apps	(Points)
1990	Tonga	1	(0)
1992–2000	United States	46	(130)
- Correct as of 10 February 2014
National sevens team
Years	Team		Comps
- United States

Vaea Naufahu Anitoni (born 20 September 1970) is an American former rugby union player who played wing. Anitoni is the all-time leading try scorer for the U.S. national team. Anitoni played for the United States national team from 1992 to 2000. During that period, Anitoni played in 46 matches, starting 44, and scored 26 tries, a record which still stands today.

== International career ==
Anitoni made his debut 13 June 1992 against Canada, and scored his first try in his next match for the US on 21 May 1994 against Canada. Anitoni's peak years for the national team were from 1996–1998, when he scored 22 tries in 28 matches. Anitoni twice scored 4 tries in a single match – once against Japan in July 1996 and again against Portugal in April 1998. Anitoni played at the 1999 Rugby World Cup, where he started 3 matches, and was regarded as a game breaker and a key player for the US national team.

Anitoni also played sevens for the U.S. national sevens team. During the mid to late 1990s Anitoni was regarded as one of the most consistent players for the U.S., due to his ability as a creator with speed. Anitoni was a member of the preliminary squad for the United States during the 2000 Rugby World Cup Sevens.

== Club rugby ==
Anitoni played for the Pomona rugby club, San Francisco's Olympic Club, and the San Mateo club which claimed the national sevens championship in 1997.

== International tries ==
Try	Opposing team	Venue	Competition	Date	Result	Score	Ref.
1	Canada	George Allen Field, Long Beach	Test match	21 May 1994	Lost	10–15	
2	Argentina	George Allen Field, Long Beach	1995 Rugby World Cup Qualifier	28 May 1994	Lost	22–28	
3	Ireland	Lansdowne Road, Dublin	Test match	5 November 1994	Lost	15–26	
4	Canada	Boxer Stadium, San Francisco	1996 Pacific Rim Championship	11 May 1996	Won	19–12	
5	Canada	Thunderbird Stadium, Vancouver	1996 Pacific Rim Championship	18 May 1996	Lost	20–24	
6	Japan	Prince Chichibu Memorial Stadium, Tokyo	1996 Pacific Rim Championship	16 June 1996	Lost	18–24	
7	Japan	Prince Chichibu Memorial Stadium, Tokyo	1996 Pacific Rim Championship	16 June 1996	Lost	18–24	
8	Hong Kong	Boxer Stadium, San Francisco	1996 Pacific Rim Championship	29 June 1996	Won	42–23	
9	Hong Kong	Boxer Stadium, San Francisco	1996 Pacific Rim Championship	29 June 1996	Won	42–23	
10	Japan	Boxer Stadium, San Francisco	1996 Pacific Rim Championship	6 July 1996	Won	74–5	
11	Japan	Boxer Stadium, San Francisco	1996 Pacific Rim Championship	6 July 1996	Won	74–5	
12	Japan	Boxer Stadium, San Francisco	1996 Pacific Rim Championship	6 July 1996	Won	74–5	
13	Japan	Boxer Stadium, San Francisco	1996 Pacific Rim Championship	6 July 1996	Won	74–5	
14	Uruguay	Fletcher's Fields, Markham	1996 Pan-American Championship	21 September 1996	Won	27–13	
15	Japan	Boxer Stadium, San Francisco	1997 Pacific Rim Championship	7 June 1997	Won	51–29	
16	Wales	Wilimington	Test match	5 July 1997	Lost	20–30	
17	Wales	Boxer Stadium, San Francisco	Test match	12 July 1997	Lost	23–28	
18	Portugal	Estádio Universitário de Lisboa, Lisbon	Test match	8 April 1998	Won	61–5	
19	Portugal	Estádio Universitário de Lisboa, Lisbon	Test match	8 April 1998	Won	61–5	
20	Portugal	Estádio Universitário de Lisboa, Lisbon	Test match	8 April 1998	Won	61–5	
21	Portugal	Estádio Universitário de Lisboa, Lisbon	Test match	8 April 1998	Won	61–5	
22	Spain	El Puerto de Santa María	Test match	12 April 1998	Won	49–3	
23	Spain	El Puerto de Santa María	Test match	12 April 1998	Won	49–3	
24	Hong Kong	Aberdeen Stadium, Hong Kong	1998 Pacific Rim Championship	16 May 1998	Lost	25–43	
25	Argentina	Cricket and Rugby Club, Buenos Aires	1999 Rugby World Cup Qualifier	15 August 1998	Lost	24–52	
26	Canada	Stanley Park, Toronto	1999 Pacific Rim Championship	19 June 1999	Won	18–17	

== Honors ==
Individual

- US Rugby Hall of Fame
- US all time leading try scorer
