= Canada–United States sports rivalries =

Canada–United States relations

- Canada: United States

Due to of their proximity and similar sporting cultures, Canada and United States are frequent rivals in a wide variety of international sports.

== Overall rivalry and the Olympic Games ==
For both countries, the Soviet Union was often the common rival in most international competitions before 1991. However, since the fall of the Soviet Union, the two neighbouring countries have been more heated rivals, especially in winter sports where the talent pools of the two countries are more evenly matched. Although the United States has more medals than Canada in gold, silver, bronze, and total medals won throughout the history of the Winter Olympic Games, the gap has narrowed considerably over time. Most recently, both the United States men's and women's ice hockey teams defeated Canada in the gold medal games of the 2026 Winter Olympics. In winter sports, the rivalry is often more keenly felt by Canadians, as outside of hockey, the competition is more balances than in the summer sports, which the United States are typically favoured. The United States' closest rival at the Summer Olympics is China. All time, the United States is first in gold, silver, bronze, and total medals won at the Olympics.

In the run-up to the 1998 Winter Olympics, Los Angeles Times columnist Mike Penner named Canada the United States' most important rival, especially in hockey. and USA Today ran the headline "Cold War now means Canada", with Canadian columnist Terry Jones reporting that the Canadian Olympic team approved of the comments and shared the news clippings around the athlete's village in Nagano. In the Winter Olympics, both the United States and Canada have won the medal table once, while the United States is ranked second in the all-time Winter Olympic table, with Canada ranked fifth. In the Summer Olympics, the United States has won the medal count 19 times, compared to zero for Canada. The United States is ranked 1st in the all-time Summer Olympic medal table, while Canada is ranked 19th.

Based on results in Olympics, World Championships, and other major competitions for respective sports, the United States is more successful than Canada in baseball, basketball, soccer, tennis, golf, swimming, athletics, boxing, lacrosse, shooting, diving, wrestling, rowing, gymnastics, sailing, cycling, weightlifting, water polo, archery, equestrian, volleyball, beach volleyball, fencing, triathlon, judo, taekwondo, figure skating, snowboarding, speed skating, alpine skiing, and bobsleigh among others, while Canada is better all time in ice hockey, curling and rugby.

== Baseball ==
It was considered a major upset when Canada defeated the United States in the 2006 World Baseball Classic, which some commentators called a "Miracle on Dirt", a reference to the Miracle on Ice when the United States national hockey team beat the Soviet Union in 1980.

The United States beat Canada in the 2009 World Baseball Classic in Toronto. The United States also beat Canada in the 2013 World Baseball Classic. The United States beat Canada again in the 2017 World Baseball Classic, by a score of 8–0. The United States once again beat Canada in the 2023 World Baseball Classic, this time by a score of 12–1, in a game that was ended after 7 innings due to the 10-run mercy rule. Although there are only two Canadians in the United States Hall of Fame (Ferguson Jenkins and Larry Walker), four different Canadian players have been named MVP of either the National or American League since 1997 (Larry Walker, NL, 1997; Justin Morneau, AL, 2006; Joey Votto, NL, 2010; Freddie Freeman, NL, 2020).

The United States beat Canada for a 5th straight time by a score of 5–3 in the quarterfinals of the 2026 World Baseball Classic on March 13, 2026.

== Cricket ==
While cricket is not among the most popular sports in either country, they have the distinction of having played against each other in the first international cricket match in 1844.

== Hockey ==
=== Men's ===
Hockey is by far the most competitive sport between the two countries. The two teams have been close rivals since the early days of international hockey, facing each other for the gold medal at the first Olympic hockey tournament in 1920. The United States was not able to defeat Canada until the 1960 Winter Olympics, and achieved its most recent victory at the 1980 Olympics. However, during the 1991 Canada Cup, American defenseman Gary Suter cross-checked and injured Canadian superstar Wayne Gretzky, creating a feeling of animosity among Canadian fans. In 1996, the United States won a victory during a best-on-best men's tournament by defeating Canada at the 1996 World Cup of Hockey on Canadian soil in Montreal and defeating Canada in three of four games that they played at the tournament. Canada took revenge by beating the United States for the gold again at the 2002 Olympics on American soil in Salt Lake City. During their next Olympic match, Canada defeated the United States 3–2 in overtime in the gold medal game at the 2010 Olympics on Canadian soil in Vancouver, after the United States shocked Canada in the group stage of the tournament. The two teams faced off against each other in the 2014 Olympics in Sochi's semi-final for the right to go to the gold medal game, which Canada once again won. Most recently, the United States and Canada faced off against each other in the 2022 Olympics in the group stage, which the United States won 4–2. The United States beat Canada in their next best on best competition, with the United States beating Canada 3–1 in Montreal in the 2025 4 Nations Face-Off. During the same tournament, Canadian fans booed "The Star-Spangled Banner" in response to the 2025 United States trade war with Canada and Mexico as well as President Trump's pro-American annexation rhetoric. Canada and the United States faced each other again in the final round of the same 4 Nations Face-Off tournament on February 20, 2025, with Canada defeating the United States 3–2 in overtime. Canada and the United States faced each other again in the gold medal game at the 2026 Olympics where the United States this time beat Canada, 2–1 in overtime.

==== Junior ====
The two countries are perennial rivals at the World Junior Championships for players under 20 years of age. Overall, Canada holds a total of 20 gold medals, while the United States holds seven gold medals, however in recent years they have been more evenly matched in terms of success. Canada won 5 consecutive gold medals from 2005–09. Since 2010, the United States has won six gold medals, while Canada has won five.

=== Women's ===
Canada and the United States have faced each other in the championship game of nearly every Olympics and World Championships since the beginning of international play. A few of Canada's and the United States' losses have been to teams outside their rivalry. At the World Championships, the rivalry has recently been dominated by the United States, which has won 7 of the last 9 World Championships. After the United States won the gold medal game at the 1998 Olympics Games, Canada won the next four gold medals in 2002, 2006, 2010 and 2014. At the 2002 Olympic Games, Canada defeated the United States 3–2 in the women’s gold medal game. The two teams did not meet during the 2006 Olympic Games. They faced off again for gold at the 2010 Olympic Games, where Canada won 2–0. At the 2014 Olympic Games Canada defeated the United States 3–2 in the group stage and then beat them again 3–2 in overtime to claim the gold medal. In the 2018 Olympic Games, the United States lost to Canada 2–1 in the group stage but went on to win the gold medal game in a 3–2 shootout victory. Canada and the United States met twice at the 2022 Olympics, with Canada winning 4–2 in the group stage and 3–2 in the gold medal game. They faced each other twice again at the 2026 Olympics, where the United States defeated Canada 5–0 in the group stage and then won 2–1 in overtime in the gold medal game. Since women's ice hockey was introduced at the Olympics in 1998, either Canada or the United States has won every gold medal. Canada has won five gold medals, while the United States has won three.

== Lacrosse ==
=== Men's ===
No team other than Canada or the United States has ever won the World Lacrosse Championship. The United States has eleven championships, and Canada has three.

== Rugby Union ==
=== Men's ===
Both countries are middle-of-the-pack internationally in rugby union, and therefore closely matched. Canada's first win in an international "test match" was against the United States in 1977. The teams formerly faced each other in the regional PARA Pan American Championship and Churchill Cup, and still do in the Pan American Games and Americas Rugby Championship.

=== Wheelchair ===
==== Men's ====
The rivalry between the two teams was the subject of an Oscar-nominated 2005 documentary film Murderball.

== Soccer ==
=== Men's ===
A Canadian club, Galt F.C., beat an American club, Christian Brothers College, for the gold at the 1904 Summer Olympics in St. Louis. The United States under-23 team defeated Canada to take the bronze medal at the 1999 Pan-Am Games on Canadian soil in Winnipeg. On the other hand, Canada's under-20 team defeated the United States to win their group of the 2003 CONCACAF U-20 Tournament in Charleston, South Carolina.

The two nations frequently face each other in regional competition in the CONCACAF Nations League and Gold Cup; however, the United States has historically been the stronger side. The overall record as of March 23, 2025, is 18 wins for the United States, 12 wins for Canada, and 12 draws in favor of the United States, and American soccer fans generally look to Mexico as the main rival, while Canada is a secondary rival. The United States has qualified for 11 World Cups and has made it to the semifinals in 1930, the quarterfinals in 2002, and has made it to the round of 16 in 1934, 1994, 2010, 2014 and 2022, while on the only two occasions that Canada qualified for the World Cup, in 1986 and 2022, they lost all six group stage matches. Canada's lone FIFA World Cup goal was scored on November 27, 2022, via a header from Bayern Munich's Alphonso Davies, while their other goal was an own goal scored in their 1–2 defeat to Morocco.

This lack of historical success has led to the Canada-United States rivalry frequently being overshadowed by the much more competitive United States-Mexico rivalry. Canada had not beaten the United States since a friendly in 1985 until October 15, 2019, when Canada defeated the United States 2-0 at BMO Field in Toronto. The following month, on November 15, the United States beat Canada 4–1 in Orlando. Since then, matches between the two have been very competitive. The United States defeated Canada 1–0 in a 2021 Gold Cup matchup in Kansas City. In 2022 World Cup qualifying, Canada earned a 1–1 draw in Nashville and defeated the United States 2–0 in Hamilton, eventually finishing ahead of all other Concacaf nations.

On June 18, 2023, Canada and the United States met in the 2023 CONCACAF Nations League final at Allegiant Stadium in Las Vegas, Nevada, marking the first time the two nations faced each other in the final of a major CONCACAF tournament. This match was the final game of Canadian captain Atiba Hutchinson's career, as he retired immediately following the tournament. The United States won the game, 2–0. Three weeks later, the U.S. eliminated Canada 3–2 on penalties in the 2023 CONCACAF Gold Cup quarter-final. In an international friendly on September 7, 2024, Canada defeated the United States 2–1 in Kansas City, marking their first win over the United States on U.S. soil in 67 years.

On March 23, 2025, Canada defeated the United States 2–1 in the 2024–25 CONCACAF Nations League third-place match, marking their second consecutive win over the United States and their first back-to-back victories against them since 1985. The match was played amid heightened political tensions between Canada and the United States; the previous month, Canada head coach Jesse Marsch had criticized U.S. President Donald Trump's comments about Canada becoming the "51st state" during the tournament's media day. In stoppage time, a scuffle involving players from both teams broke out after Gio Reyna brought down Jacob Shaffelburg near the touchline. The following year, Marsch continued to criticize the Americans before their October 6, 2026 friendly at Allianz Field, in particular American exceptionalism with the Balogun red card controversy, which the U.S. ultimately would defeat Canada 1–0 in an overly physical match, with Stephen Eustáquio, Auston Trusty, and Justin Ellis suffering injuries.

To date, only two players have played for both Canada and United States national football teams. The first was Gordon Burness who earned a cap for Canada in 1925 and a cap for the United States in 1926. The second was Ayo Akinola, who played one match for the United States in late 2020 before switching allegiance to Canada in 2021 and earning four caps.

National team all-time results
Competition	Matches	Wins		Draws
Competition	Matches	CAN	USA	Draws
CONCACAF Championship qualification	7	3	1	3
CONCACAF Gold Cup	6	0	4	2
CONCACAF Nations League	4	2	2	0
FIFA World Cup qualification (Note: This row only includes results from World Cup qualifying competitions that were separate from the CONCACAF Championship.)	8	4	3	1
North American Nations Cup	1	0	1	0
Competitive total	26	9	11	6
International friendlies	16	3	7	7
Official total	42	12	18	13
Unofficial matches	4	3	1	0
Disputed matches	1 (Note: Match from the 1990 North American Nations Cup, which is not recognized by the USSF as they fielded their second team.)	1	0	0
All-time total	47	16	18	13

As of March 23, 2025

=== Women's ===
The two teams are more closely matched than in the men's game, providing for more close finishes. Notably, the two nations faced each other in the final of the 2002 FIFA U-19 Women's World Championship on Canadian soil in Edmonton, with the United States winning. The two nations' senior sides met in the third-place match of the 2003 FIFA Women's World Cup on American soil in Carson, California. Also, Canada's senior team beat the United States under-20 team in the final of the 2008 Cyprus Cup. At the 2012 CONCACAF Women's Olympic Qualifying Tournament in Vancouver, the United States defeated Canada 4–0 in the final.

By 2012, the United States had won every match since 2001, 26 in a row. There was a memorable match between the two teams during the 2012 London Olympics semi-finals, which a CONCACAF website columnist had described as the most important of their 26-year-long rivalry on the international scene. The Canadians led the match at three different points, but were ultimately defeated in overtime, allowing the Americans to advance to the Gold Medal Match. The United States most recently won the Women's World Cup on Canadian soil and then again in 2019 in France, which increased their record to four World Cup wins and four Olympic gold medals. Canada won the Olympic Gold Medal at the 2020 Summer Olympics, defeating the United States 1–0 in the semifinal match. The United States won their fifth Olympic Gold Medal at the 2024 Summer Olympics. The United States leads the overall series with 55 wins for the United States, four wins for Canada, and nine draws. The United States has won the FIFA Women's World Cup four times, has made the final five times, and has made the semifinal eight times. Canada has never won the FIFA Women's World Cup, nor made a final, and has only made one semifinal. The United States also has five Olympic gold medals to Canada's one.
