= 1999 Rugby World Cup qualifying =

Rugby qualifying competition

Tournament details
- Dates: 1995 – 1999
- No. of nations: 71

The 1999 Rugby World Cup qualifying was held in several continental zones. Four countries qualified automatically—Wales as tournament hosts, South Africa as reigning champions, New Zealand as runners-up in the previous tournament, and France as winners of the third-place playoff in the previous tournament. Repechage was first introduced for the 1999 competition qualifying.

== Tournaments ==
- Africa Qualification
- European Qualification
- Americas qualification
- Asia qualification
- Oceania qualification
- Repechage

== Qualified teams ==
- Europe
  - England (Europe 1)
  - France (Automatic qualifier)
  - Ireland (Europe 2)
  - Italy (Europe 4)
  - Romania (Europe 5)
  - Scotland (Europe 3)
  - Spain (Europe 6)
  - Wales (Host)
- Africa
  - South Africa (Champion)
  - Namibia (Africa 1)
- Americas
  - Argentina (Americas 1)
  - Canada (Americas 2)
  - Uruguay (Repechage 2)
  - United States (Americas 3)
- Oceania
  - Australia (Oceania 1)
  - Fiji (Oceania 2)
  - New Zealand (Automatic qualifier)
  - Western Samoa (Oceania 3)
  - Tonga (Repechage 1)
- Asia
  - Japan (Asia 1)

== Automatic qualifiers ==
Only the tournament hosts, as well as the two finalists and the third-place winner from the previous Rugby World Cup, were automatically qualified for the 1999 Rugby World Cup.

- France (Third place)
- New Zealand (Runner-up)
- South Africa (Champion)
- Wales (Host)

== Regional qualifiers ==
=== Africa ===
- Namibia (Africa 1)

=== Europe ===
- England (Europe 1)
- Ireland (Europe 2)
- Scotland (Europe 3)
- Italy (Europe 4)
- Romania (Europe 5)
- Spain (Europe 6)

=== Asia ===
- Japan (Asia 1)

=== Americas ===
- Argentina (Americas 1)
- Canada (Americas 2)
- United States (Americas 3)
- Uruguay (Repechage 2)

=== Oceania ===
- Australia (Oceania 1)
- Fiji (Oceania 2)
- Western Samoa (Oceania 3)
- Tonga (Repechage 1)
