= 2009 Churchill Cup =

Tournament information
- Date: June 6 – June 21, 2009
- Venue(s): Dick's Sporting Goods Park, Commerce City, Colorado
- Teams: 6

Final positions
- Champion: Ireland Wolfhounds (1st title)
- Runner-up: England Saxons

Tournament statistics
- Matches played: 9

The 2009 Churchill Cup took place between June 6 and June 21, 2009, marking the seventh year of the Churchill Cup.

For the first time in the tournament's history, all rounds were held in the United States. This was done in an effort to reduce the cost of the tournament after the discontinued sponsorship by Barclays and to keep the tournament from being suspended for a year. Six rugby union teams took part: Canada, England Saxons, Ireland A, the USA, Argentina Jaguars, and for the first time in the tournament, the Georgia national team. Tickets for the event went on sale to USA Rugby members on April 2, 2009, and general sales tickets went on sale on April 24, 2009. The matches were broadcast live on Sky Sports in the UK and Setanta Sports North America in the US.

== Winners ==
The Main Cup was won by Ireland A (who beat the England Saxons in the Cup Final), the Plate Competition was won by the Argentina Jaguars (who defeated Canada in the Final), and the Bowl Competition was won by the USA (who beat Georgia).

== Format ==
The teams played in a round-robin format between two pools to decide the elimination matches which took place on June 20, 2009. All six teams participated on the finals day: the two pool winners competed in the Cup Final, the two runners-up played in a Plate Final, and the two bottom-placed teams met in the Bowl Final.

== Venues ==
After the 2008 tournament, which was played both in Canada and the United States, in 2009 all rounds of the tournament as well as the Finals Day were played around the Denver, Colorado area which is the future home for the tournament for the next three years. The first three days of round-robin play were at the modern, purpose-built rugby stadium Infinity Park in Glendale, Colorado on the south side of Denver. The finals were held at Dick's Sporting Goods Park in Commerce City, which is home to Denver's MLS team, the Colorado Rapids.

== Tables ==
=== Pool A ===
Place	Nation	Games				Points			Bonus points	Table points
Place	Nation	Played	Won	Drawn	Lost	For	Against	Difference	Bonus points	Table points
1	Ireland A	2	2	0	0	70	24	+46	2	10
2	Canada	2	1	0	1	61	40	+21	1	5
3	Georgia	2	0	0	2	15	82	-67	0	0

=== Pool B ===
Place	Nation	Games				Points			Bonus points	Table points
Place	Nation	Played	Won	Drawn	Lost	For	Against	Difference	Bonus points	Table points
1	England A	2	2	0	0	84	37	+47	1	9
2	Argentina XV	2	1	0	1	55	42	+13	0	4
3	United States	2	0	0	2	31	91	-60	0	0

== Results ==
=== Day 1 ===
June 6, 2009
14:15

England Saxons	28–20	Argentina XV
	Report

Infinity Park, Glendale, CO
Referee: Peter Fitzgibbon (Ireland)

June 6, 2009
16:30

Canada	42–10	Georgia
	Report

Infinity Park, Glendale, CO
Referee: Matt Goddard (Australia)

=== Day 2 ===
June 10, 2009
16:30

Canada	19–30	Ireland A
	Report

Infinity Park, Glendale, CO
Referee: Matt Goddard (Australia)

June 10, 2009
19:00

United States	14–35	Argentina XV
	Report

Infinity Park, Glendale, CO
Referee: Peter Fitzgibbon (Ireland)

=== Day 3 ===
June 14, 2009
13:00

United States	17–56	England A
	Report

Infinity Park, Glendale, CO
Referee: Peter Fitzgibbon (Ireland)

June 14, 2009
15:30

Georgia	5–40	Ireland A
	Report

Infinity Park, Glendale, CO
Referee: Matt Goddard (Australia)

== Finals ==
=== Bowl Final ===
June 21, 2009
16:30 (PST)

Georgia	13–31	United States
	Report

Dick's Sporting Goods Park, Commerce City, CO
Attendance: 5,225
Referee: Matt Goddard (Australia)

=== Plate Final ===
June 21, 2009
12:05 PST

Canada	29–44	Argentina XV
	Report

Dick's Sporting Goods Park, Commerce City, CO
Referee: Peter Fitzgibbon (Ireland)

=== Cup Final ===
June 21, 2009
14:30 PST

Ireland A	49–22	England A
	Report

Dick's Sporting Goods Park, Commerce City, CO
Referee: Matt Goddard (Australia)
