= 2006 Churchill Cup =

- Date: 3–17 June 2006
- Countries: Canada; England A Ireland Wolfhounds; New Zealand Māori; Scotland A United States

Final positions
- Champions: Māori (2nd title)

Tournament statistics
- Matches played: 9

The 2006 Churchill Cup was a rugby union competition played between the second teams of various top tier international rugby nations and the first teams of traditionally less prominent teams, such as Canada and the United States. The 2006 tournament began on June 3 and ended on June 17. The 2006 competition marked the fourth year of the Churchill Cup as well as its expansion from four to six teams. The Cup was contested by Canada, England Saxons, Ireland A, New Zealand Māori, Scotland A, and the United States. New Zealand Māori won the competition.

== The Tournament ==
The teams were split into two pools of three. The Canada pool played in Ontario and consisted of Canada, England Saxons and Scotland A. The America pool played their games in Santa Clara, California, and consisted of the US, New Zealand Maori and Ireland A.

The winners of the two pools moved on to compete in the overall final; the two runners up competed for the plate and the two teams to finish third in their group competed for the bowl. All of the finals were played in Edmonton.

=== Pools ===
Canada Pool:

Pos	Name	Pld	W	D	L	BP	Pts
1	Scotland A	2	2	0	0	0	8
2	England A	2	1	0	1	2	6
3	Canada	2	0	0	2	1	1

3 June 2006

England A	7 - 13	Scotland A

York Stadium, Toronto

7 June 2006

Canada	10 - 15	Scotland A

Twin Elm Rugby Park, Ottawa

10 June 2006

Canada	11 - 41	England A

York Stadium, Toronto

USA Pool:

Pos	Name	Pld	W	D	L	BP	Pts
1	Māori	2	2	0	0	2	10
2	Ireland A	2	1	0	1	1	5
3	United States	2	0	0	2	0	0

3 June 2006

United States	13 - 28	Ireland A
	Report

Buck Shaw Stadium, Santa Clara
Attendance: 3,700

7 June 2006

United States	6 - 74	New Zealand Maori
	Report

Buck Shaw Stadium, Santa Clara
Attendance: 3,562

10 June 2006

New Zealand Maori	27 - 6	Ireland A

Buck Shaw Stadium, Santa Clara

=== Finals ===
Fifth Place Final:

17 June 2006

Canada	33 - 18	United States
	Report

Commonwealth Stadium, Edmonton

Third Place Final

17 June 2006

Ireland A	30 - 27	England A

Commonwealth Stadium, Edmonton

First Place Final

17 June 2006

New Zealand Maori	52 - 17	Scotland A

Commonwealth Stadium, Edmonton

== See also ==
- Churchill Cup
