= Rockne Stadium =

- Full name: Knute Rockne Stadium
- Address: 1117 South Central Avenue; Chicago, Illinois; United States
- Coordinates: 41.8669°N 87.7632°W
- Owner: Chicago Public Schools
- Operator: Chicago Public Schools
- Type: Stadium
- Current use: Football, track and field
- Public transit: 12 (at Central & Fillmore); 305 (at Roosevelt Rd & Central Ave)

Construction
- Renovated: 2007, 2022–2024

Tenant
- Chicago Public League

Rockne Stadium is a stadium in Chicago, Illinois. It is one of seven stadiums operated by Chicago Public Schools, which play host to Chicago Public League sporting events.

The property that the stadium occupies is 8.5 acres (3.4 ha). By 2022, the facility was being used for 1,000 games each year.

The stadium was renovated in 2007, after reaching a poor state of repair. During that renovation, lighting was first installed so that the venue could host night games. From 2022 through 2024, the stadium underwent a two-phase $10 million renovation. The first phase replaced the grass field at the stadium (which was in poor condition) with an artificial turf, and also replaced the running-track with a new eight-lane track surface. The second phase of the renovations overhauled the locker rooms and bathrooms, upgraded the scoreboard and lighting, added a concessions stand, and added a parking lot. The first phase broke ground in 2022, and the final phase broke ground in 2023. The final phase was completed in 2024.
