= 1995 Canada rugby union tour of Fiji and New Zealand =

Summary
P	W	D	L
Total
5	2	0	3
Test match
2	1	0	1
Opponent
P	W	D	L
Fiji
1	1	0	0
New Zealand
1	0	0	1

The 1995 Canada rugby union tour of Fiji and New Zealand was a series of matches played in April 1995 in Fiji and New Zealand by Canada national rugby union team in order to prepare the 1995 Rugby World Cup.

== Results ==
Scores and results list Canada's points tally first.

Opposing Team	For	Against	Date	Venue	Status
Fiji	22	10	April 8, 1995	Nadi	Test Match
South Island Selection	18	19	April 12, 1995	Timaru	Tour match
New Zealand XV	17	38	April 15, 1995	Palmerston North	Tour match
North island selection	40	35	April 18, 1995	Rotorua	Tour match
New Zealand	7	73	April 22, 1995	Eden Park, Auckland	Test Match

== Additional match ==
An Additional match was played the day after the test against New Zealand. A selection called "New Zealand B" played against a selection (Canada Invitation XV) formed by the Canadian players that didn't participate at the test and some New Zealand Players. The match was played on the ground of Takapuna Rugby Football Club and was won by Canadian Invitation XV by 57–54.
