= 1986 Japan rugby union tour of North America =

Summary
P	W	D	L
Total
8	4	1	3
Test match
2	1	1	0
Opponent
P	W	D	L
United States
1	0	1	0
Canada
1	0	0	1

The 1986 Japan rugby union tour of North America was a series of matches played in May–June 1986 in North America by Japan national rugby union team.

== Results ==
14 May 1986

Eastern RFU	35 - 21	Japan XV

Mount Vernon

17 May 1986

Midwest RFU	24 - 6	Japan XV

Chicago

21 May 1986

Western RFU	13 - 23	Japan XV

Kansas City

24 May 1986

Junior Eagles	10 - 18	Japan XV

Dallas

28 May 1986

Pacific Coast RFU	3 - 24	Japan XV

Bothel

31 May 1986

United States	9 - 9	Japan

Torrance

4 June 1986

Canada A	50 - 21	Japan XV

Victoria

7 June 1986

Canada	21 - 26	Japan

Burnaby
