= 2005 Churchill Cup =

- Date: 14 June – 21 June 2005
- Countries: Argentina XV; Canada; England Saxons; United States

Final positions
- Champions: England (2nd title)

Tournament statistics
- Matches played: 4

The 2005 Churchill Cup was held between 14 June and 21 June 2005 in Edmonton, Canada. It was the third edition of the Churchill Cup competition. three of the four rugby union teams taking part in the 2004 men's competition, Canada, England A, the USA, returned to compete, while Argentina A replaced the Māori.

There was no women's event, although a similar event, the 2005 Canada Cup did take place.

== Format ==
The competition took on a straight 'knock-out' format. Four teams played in two semi-final matches, with the North American sides kept apart. The winners of each semi final competed in the final match, while the losers took part in a 3rd/4th place playoff. Four matches were played over a period of two weeks.

== Results ==
=== Semi-finals ===
2005-06-19
16:30

United States	30 – 34	Argentina XV
	Report

Commonwealth Stadium, Edmonton, Alberta

2005-06-19
16:30

England A	29 – 5	Canada

Edmonton, Canada

=== Final ===
2005-06-26
16:30

England A	45 – 16	Argentina XV

Edmonton, Canada

=== Consolation final ===
2005-06-26
16:30

Canada	19 – 20	United States
	Report

Commonwealth Stadium, Edmonton, Alberta

== See also ==
- Churchill Cup
