= 1983 Italy rugby union tour of Canada and the United States =

Summary
P	W	D	L
Total
6	5	0	1
Test match
2	1	0	1
Opponent
P	W	D	L
Canada
2	1	0	1

The 1983 Italy rugby union tour of Canada and the United States was a series of matches played between June and July 1983 in Canada and the United States by Italy national rugby union team

== Results ==
Scores and results list Italy's points tally first.

Opposing Team	For	Against	Date	Venue	Status
Alberta	13	3	18 June 1983	Edmonton	Tour match
West Canada	18	6	21 June 1983	Calgary	Tour match
Canada	13	19	25 June 1983	Burnaby	Test match
East Canada	16	12	28 June 1983	Montreal	Tour match
Canada	37	9	2 July 1983	Toronto	Test match
Midwest United States	25	10	4 July 1983	Milwaukee	Tour match
