= 1983 Canada rugby union tour of England =

Summary
P	W	D	L
Total
5	2	0	3
Test match
1	0	0	1
Opponent
P	W	D	L
England XV
1	1	0	0

The 1983 Canada rugby union tour of England, was a series of five matches played by the Canada national rugby union team in England in October 1983. The Canadian team won two of their tour matches, and lost the other three.

Canadian lost the match against England, (Rugby Football Union did not award full international cap)

== Results ==
Scores and results list Canada's points tally first.

Opponent	For	Against	Date	Venue	Status
Combined Services	17	14	October 1, 1983	Services Portsmouth Rugby Football	Tour match
Headingley	9	16	October 5, 1983	Headingley	Tour match
Oxford University	19	9	October 8, 1983	Oxford	Tour match
Sussex	9	16	October 11, 1983	Worthing	Tour match
England XV	0	27	October 15, 1983	Twickenham, London	test match
