= 1978 France rugby union tour of Far East and Canada =

Summary
P	W	D	L
Total
7	7	0	0
Test match
3	3	0	0
Opponent
P	W	D	L
Hong Kong
1	1	0	0
Japan
1	1	0	0
Canada
1	1	0	0

Scores and results list France's points tally first.

Opposing Team	For	Against	Date	Venue	Status
Hong Kong	26	6	9 September 1978	Hong Kong	Test match
Japan XV	61	10	14 September 1978	Tokyo	Tour match
Western Japan	98	10	17 September 1978	Osaka	Tour match
Kyushu	37	3	20 September 1978	Fukuoka	Tour match
Japan	55	16	23 September 1978	Chichibu, Tokyo	Test match
British Columbia	17	10	26 September 1978	Burnaby	Tour match
Canada	24	9	30 September 1978	Calgary	Test match
