= Douglas Horn Trophy =

Perpetual rugby union trophy

- Sport: Rugby union
- Instituted: 2008
- Number of teams: 2
- Country: Canada; Scotland
- Holders: Scotland (2024)
- Most titles: Scotland (4 titles)

The Douglas Horn Trophy - also called the Douglas JL Horn Memorial Cup - was established as a perpetual rugby union trophy between Canada and Scotland in 2008.

Douglas Horn is the father of Alan Horn, a board member of Rugby Canada, while the trophy is essentially to recognise the long-standing relationship between Canada and Scotland in both the rugby world and international relations.

Scotland are the current holders winning 73 –12 in Ottawa in July 2024.

Scotland have held the cup for the entirety of its existence.

== Matches ==
| Details | P | Canada win | Scotland win | D | Canada points | Scotland points |
|---|---|---|---|---|---|---|
| In Canada | 3 | 0 | 3 | 0 | 39 | 140 |
| In Scotland | 1 | 0 | 1 | 0 | 0 | 41 |
| Overall | 4 | 0 | 4 | 0 | 39 | 181 |

== Results ==
- ST – Summer Test
- AI – Autumn International

| Year | Date | Venue | Home | Score | Away | Trophy Winner |
|---|---|---|---|---|---|---|
| 2024 | 6 July | TD Place Stadium, Ottawa | Canada | 12–73 | Scotland | Scotland |
| 2018 | 9 June | Commonwealth Stadium, Edmonton | Canada | 10–48 | Scotland | Scotland |
| 2014 | 14 June | BMO Field, Toronto | Canada | 17–19 | Scotland | Scotland |
| 2008 | 21 November | Pittodrie Stadium, Aberdeen | Scotland | 41–0 | Canada | Scotland |
