= Boxer Stadium =

American Sport Stadium

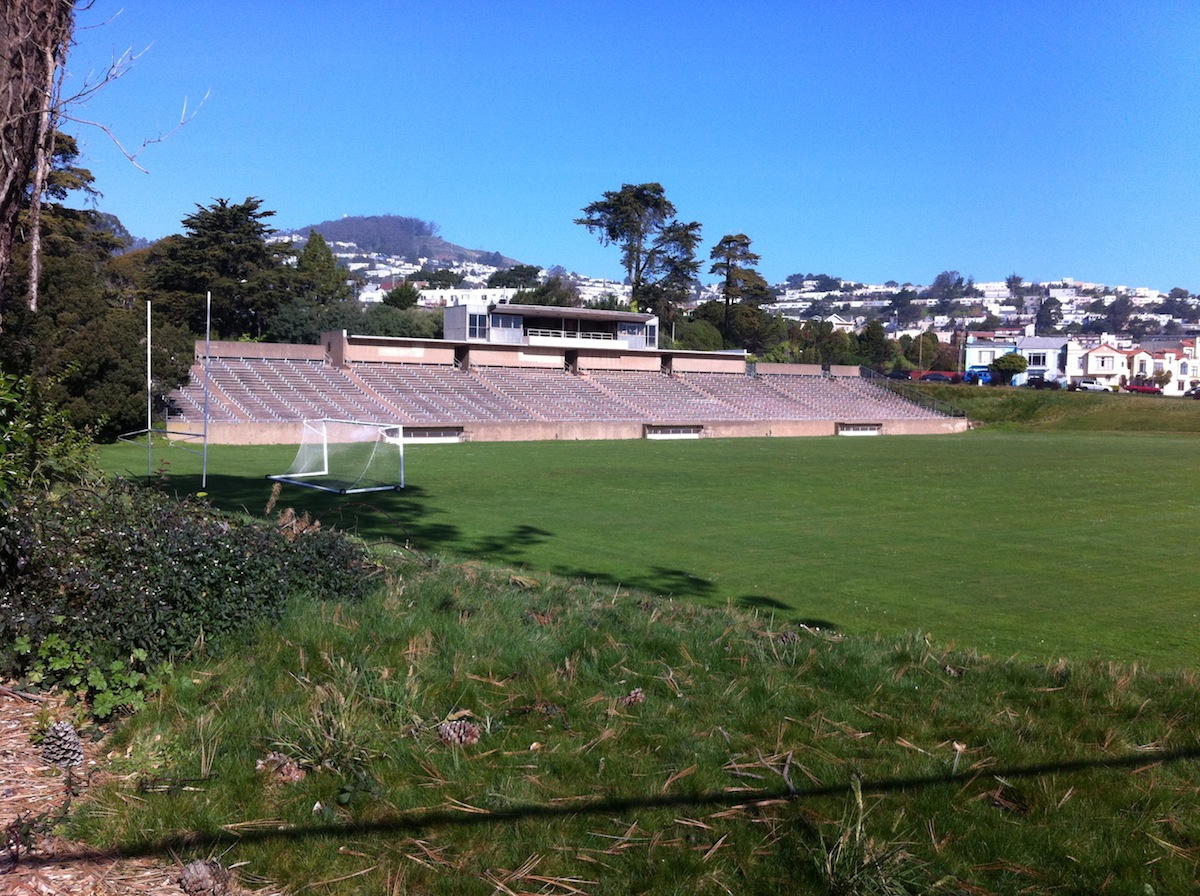
- View of the stadium in 2013
- Interactive map of Boxer Stadium
- Full name: Matthew J. Boxer Stadium
- Former names: Balboa Park Soccer Stadium (1953–1990s)
- Address: 166 Havelock St, Balboa Park; San Francisco, CA; United States
- Coordinates: 37.7258°N 122.4446°W
- Owner: City and County of San Francisco
- Operator: San Francisco Recreation & Parks Department
- Capacity: 3,500
- Type: Stadium
- Surface: Grass
- Field size: 100 x 65 m
- Current use: Soccer

Construction
- Opened: 1953; 73 years ago

Tenants
- El Farolito SC (NPSL) (2018–present); Gay Games (1982); San Francisco Dogfish (MLU) (2014); San Francisco Stompers (NPSL) (2013); San Francisco Rush (PRO Rugby) (2016); USA Eagles (1996–2003)

Website
- sfrecpark.org/boxerstadium

Boxer Stadium (also known as Matthew J. Boxer Stadium) is a stadium in San Francisco, California. Located in Balboa Park, the stadium has a capacity of 3,500. It is owned and operated by the San Francisco Recreation & Parks Department and is the only public soccer-specific stadium in San Francisco.

Boxer Stadium is the primary home of the century-old San Francisco Soccer Football League.

== History ==
Boxer Stadium opened September 27, 1953 as the Balboa Park Soccer Stadium at a cost of $150,000. The concrete bleachers were added later after the November 1953 Proposition G bond passage. The stadium was renamed in honor of the late SFSFL President, Matthew J. Boxer in the 1990s.

Boxer Stadium served as the main venue of the 1982 Gay Games. The venue also hosted the California Rugby League Championship Game in 2021. East Palo Alto Razborbacks won the championship.

== Tenants ==
The stadium is home to the San Francisco Soccer Football League, the Golden Gate Women's Soccer League, and the San Francisco Unified School District CIF high school and middle school soccer.

For the 2013 season the San Francisco Stompers of the National Premier Soccer League played their home games at Boxer Stadium.

The San Francisco Glens of USL League Two played at Boxer for their first two seasons in the league (2018–19).

High school Lacrosse teams from SHC also use Boxer Stadium.

Rugby and Gaelic Athletic Association teams had used Boxer Stadium until the opening of Ray Sheeran Field on Treasure Island in 2005. In 2016, Boxer Stadium was the home pitch for the San Francisco Rush professional rugby team in the new PRO Rugby competition in the United States, however, the team was folded by the league after one season citing an unsuitable venue.

== Rugby events ==
=== USA Internationals ===
Boxer Stadium has hosted 16 USA Eagles international rugby union matches. It was the unofficial home of the Eagles from 1996 to 2000, hosting 12 of their 17 test matches. The results are as follows:

Date	Opponents	Score	Competition	Att.	Ref.
11 May 1996	Canada	19–12	Pacific Rim Championship	3,500	
29 June 1996	Hong Kong	42–23	Pacific Rim Championship	2,200	
6 July 1996	Japan	74–5	Pacific Rim Championship	2,500	
7 June 1997	Japan	51–29	Pacific Rim Championship	1,800	
14 June 1997	Hong Kong	17–14	Pacific Rim Championship	n/a	
28 June 1997	Canada	11–22	Pacific Rim Championship	1,800	
12 July 1997	Wales	23–28	Wales tour of North America	4,425	
13 June 1998	Japan	21–25	Pacific Rim Championship	1,800	
20 June 1998	Hong Kong	17–27	Pacific Rim Championship	1,300	
14 May 1999	Tonga	30–10	Pacific Rim Championship	4,600	
22 May 1999	Fiji	25–14	Pacific Rim Championship	3,950	
15 July 2000	Samoa	12–19	Pacific Rim Championship	n/a	
16 June 2001	England	19–48	England tour of North America	5,150	
22 June 2002	Scotland	23–65	Scotland tour of North America	2,400	
15 August 2002	Uruguay	28–24	2003 World Cup qualifying	1,230	
17 May 2003	Japan	69–27	Super Powers Cup	1,852	

USA Record at the Boxer Stadium
Competition	Played	Won	Drawn	Lost	% Won
Pacific Rim Rugby Championship	11	7	0	4	63.64%
Rugby World Cup qualification	1	1	0	0	100%
Super Powers Cup	1	1	0	0	100%
Test Match	3	0	0	3	0%
Total	16	9	0	7	56.25%

Updated 30 April 2021
