= 1985 Canada rugby union tour of Australia =

Summary
| P | W | D | L |
Total
| 8 | 3 | 0 | 5 |
Test match
| 2 | 0 | 0 | 2 |
Opponent
| P | W | D | L |
Australia
| 2 | 0 | 0 | 2 |

The 1985 Canada rugby union tour of Australia was a series of matches played between May and June 1985 in Australia by the Canada national rugby union team.

== Results ==
Scores and results list Canada's points tally first.

| Opponent | For | Against | Date | Venue | Status |
|---|---|---|---|---|---|
| Queensland Country | 13 | 6 | 25 May 1985 | Cairns | Tour match |
| Northern Territory | 30 | 12 | 29 May 1985 | Darwin | Tour match |
| Western Australia | 6 | 16 | 2 June 1985 | Perth | Tour match |
| South Australia | 24 | 16 | 5 June 1985 | Adelaide | Tour match |
| New South Wales | 6 | 31 | 8 June 1985 | Sydney Sports Ground | Tour match |
| New South Wales Country | 23 | 31 | 11 June 1985 | Gosford | Tour match |
| Australia | 3 | 59 | 15 June 1985 | Cricket Ground, Sydney | Test match |
| Brisbane (ex. QLD Test players) | 16 | 24 | 18 June 1985 | Brisbane | Tour match |
| Australia | 15 | 43 | 23 June 1985 | Ballymore, Brisbane | Test match |
