= 1999 Rugby World Cup – Americas qualification =

For the 1999 Rugby World Cup qualifiers, the Americas were allocated three places in the final tournament and one place in the repechage.

Eleven teams played in the American qualifiers that were held over four stages from 1996 to 1998. Argentina, Canada and United States were the top three sides and secured their places as Americas 1, Americas 2 and Americas 3, respectively, for RWC 99. Uruguay qualified for the repechage tournament.

== Round 1 ==
=== Group 1 ===
| Pos | Team | Pld | W | D | L | PF | PA | PD | Pts |
|---|---|---|---|---|---|---|---|---|---|
| 1 | Trinidad and Tobago | 1 | 1 | 0 | 0 | 41 | 0 | +41 | 3 |
| 2 | Brazil | 1 | 0 | 0 | 1 | 0 | 41 | −41 | 1 |
| 3 | Guyana | 0 | 0 | 0 | 0 | 0 | 0 | 0 | 0 |

Guyana withdrew from the group.

Match Results
| Date | Home | Score | Away | Venue |
|---|---|---|---|---|
| 11 November 1996 | Trinidad and Tobago | 41–0 | Brazil | Port of Spain, Trinidad and Tobago |

=== Group 2 ===
| Pos | Team | Pld | W | D | L | PF | PA | PD | Pts |
|---|---|---|---|---|---|---|---|---|---|
| 1 | Bermuda | 2 | 2 | 0 | 0 | 76 | 6 | +70 | 6 |
| 2 | Bahamas | 2 | 1 | 0 | 1 | 40 | 47 | −7 | 4 |
| 3 | Barbados | 2 | 0 | 0 | 2 | 26 | 89 | −63 | 2 |

| Date | Team #1 | Score | Team #2 | Venue |
|---|---|---|---|---|
| 22 March 1997 | The Bahamas | 3–24 | Bermuda | Nassau, The Bahamas |
| 5 April 1997 | Barbados | 23–37 | The Bahamas | Bridgetown, Barbados |
| 19 April 1997 | Bermuda | 52–3 | Barbados | Hamilton, Bermuda |

== Round 2 ==
| Pos | Team | Pld | W | D | L | PF | PA | PD | Pts |
|---|---|---|---|---|---|---|---|---|---|
| 1 | Chile | 2 | 2 | 0 | 0 | 100 | 14 | +86 | 6 |
| 2 | Bermuda | 2 | 1 | 0 | 1 | 60 | 71 | −11 | 4 |
| 3 | Trinidad and Tobago | 2 | 0 | 0 | 2 | 12 | 87 | −75 | 2 |

| Date | Team #1 | Score | Team #2 | Venue |
|---|---|---|---|---|
| 20 September 1997 | Trinidad and Tobago | 6–35 | Chile | Port of Spain, Trinidad and Tobago |
| 5 October 1997 | Bermuda | 52–6 | Trinidad and Tobago | Devonshire Parish, Bermuda |
| 18 October 1997 | Chile | 65–8 | Bermuda | Santiago, Chile |

== Round 3 ==
| Pos | Team | Pld | W | D | L | PF | PA | PD | Pts |
|---|---|---|---|---|---|---|---|---|---|
| 1 | Uruguay | 2 | 2 | 0 | 0 | 63 | 17 | +46 | 6 |
| 2 | Chile | 2 | 1 | 0 | 1 | 68 | 26 | +42 | 4 |
| 3 | Paraguay | 2 | 0 | 0 | 2 | 9 | 97 | −88 | 2 |

| Date | Team #1 | Score | Team #2 | Venue |
|---|---|---|---|---|
| 21 March 1998 | Chile | 54–6 | Paraguay | Santiago, Chile |
| 28 March 1998 | Paraguay | 3–43 | Uruguay | Asunción, Paraguay |
| 4 April 1998 | Uruguay | 20–14 | Chile | Montevideo, Uruguay |

== Round 4 ==
All round 4 matches were held in Buenos Aires, Argentina.

| Pos | Team | Pld | W | D | L | PF | PA | PD | Pts |
|---|---|---|---|---|---|---|---|---|---|
| 1 | Argentina | 3 | 3 | 0 | 0 | 161 | 52 | +109 | 9 |
| 2 | Canada | 3 | 2 | 0 | 1 | 97 | 83 | +14 | 7 |
| 3 | United States | 3 | 1 | 0 | 2 | 59 | 99 | −40 | 5 |
| 4 | Uruguay | 3 | 0 | 0 | 3 | 31 | 114 | −83 | 3 |

| Date | Team #1 | Score | Team No. 2 |
|---|---|---|---|
| 15 August 1998 | Uruguay | 15–38 | Canada |
| 15 August 1998 | Argentina | 52–24 | United States |
| 18 August 1998 | Canada | 31–14 | United States |
| 18 August 1998 | Argentina | 55–0 | Uruguay |
| 22 August 1998 | United States | 21–16 | Uruguay |
| 22 August 1998 | Argentina | 54–28 | Canada |

Argentina, Canada, and United States qualified for RWC 1999, Uruguay qualified for repechage.
