= Churchill Cup =

Annual rugby union tournament

- Sport: Rugby union
- Instituted: 2003
- Inaugural season: 2003
- Ceased: 2011; 14 years ago
- Number of teams: 6
- Country: Canada; England; United States + other invited nations
- Holders: England Saxons (2011)
- Most titles: England Saxons (6)

The Churchill Cup was an annual rugby union tournament, held in June, contested by representative men's (and formerly women's) teams from Canada, England, the United States, and other invited teams (originally one and later three) from a wide array of countries.

It began in 2003 as an initiative of the governing bodies of the three regular participants—Rugby Canada, the Rugby Football Union (RFU), and USA Rugby—in cooperation with the sport's worldwide governing body World Rugby (at the time called the "International Rugby Board" (IRB)).The main intent was to provide the US and Canada with regular international competition. The final edition in 2011 featured invited teams from Italy, Russia, and Tonga, and was won by England Saxons (that country's "A", or developmental, national team). All three governing bodies of the permanent participants agreed to end the tournament after its 2011 edition, as World Rugby will include the US and Canada in its international Test calendar from 2012. Canada and the USA will, however, continue to be supported by the RFU.

The tournament was named after British prime minister Winston Churchill.

== Overview ==
The tournament was first held in 2003 with only Canada, England and the USA taking part. The tournament was set up to improve the calibre and profile of rugby in North America, and also to help develop English players not yet part of the full national team. Because of the gap in skill levels, the England A side (second level, despite the 'A' moniker), rebranded in 2006 as England Saxons, took part instead of the full England men's side; however, the full England women's side participated.

In 2004, New Zealand were invited, being represented by the New Zealand Māori men's team and the women's representative team, the Black Ferns. In 2005, the Argentine Rugby Union (UAR) sent its B side, Argentina XV, to the men's competition. Originally, New Zealand Māori had been invited, but they declined because it would clash with their fixture with the British and Irish Lions. There was no women's competition in either 2005 or 2006, largely because of Canada's preparations to host the Women's Rugby World Cup in 2006.

Originally, the competition was scheduled only to 2007, as the original contract between Rugby Canada, the Rugby Football Union (England) and USA Rugby was a five-year deal. Under the agreement, Canada would host the first three events, while the USA had an option to host in 2006 and 2007. However, because USA Rugby became involved in hosting the USA Sevens tournament in the IRB Sevens World Series, it allowed Canada to be the principal host in 2006, although that competition saw matches in the US for the first time, in San Jose (more precisely, in the Silicon Valley city of Santa Clara), and three Canadian cities hosted matches: Edmonton, Toronto, and Ottawa.

The organizers increased the number of men's teams competing from four to six, effective with the 2006 competition. South Africa and Wales had expressed an interest, but Ireland and Scotland accepted invitations for 2006. Both sent A sides to the competition, and the New Zealand Māori returned that year as well.

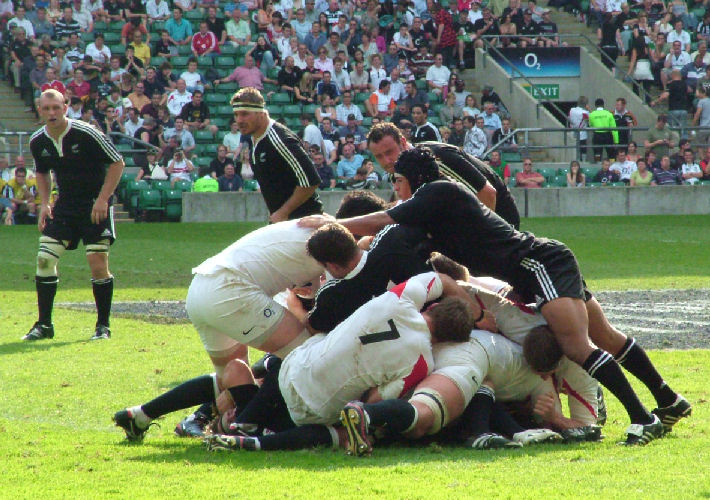
The Māori playing the Saxons in the 2007 edition

In 2007, the Churchill Cup was held in England for the first time. Both Rugby Canada and USA Rugby agreed to the one-time move largely because both countries' national teams would be competing in the 2007 Rugby World Cup in France.

The 2008 tournament returned to North America, according to tournament organizers. The participants were Canada, USA Eagles, England Saxons, Ireland A, Scotland A, and an Argentina XV (essentially a 'B', or third string team) replacing the New Zealand Maori, who as of 2008 participate in the Pacific Nations Cup.

Pool matches were held in Ottawa on June 7, Kingston on June 11, and Toronto on June 14. The finals were held at Toyota Park in Chicago on June 21.

The 2009 competition, the first to be held entirely in the US, was held in the Denver area. In addition to the three permanent competitors of Canada, the US, and England Saxons, Ireland A returned. The Argentina side was a new national selection, named "Jaguares", initially a major component in the development of a professional player pool for the national team which soon absorbed the country's previous "A" national side. Scotland A was replaced by newcomers Georgia. The winners of the 2009 Churchill Cup was Ireland A.

== Results ==
| Year | Host city/cities | Men's Cup Winner | Men's Plate Winner | Men's Bowl Winner | Women's Cup Winner |
|---|---|---|---|---|---|
| 2003 | (Canada) Vancouver | England A | No competition | No competition | England |
| 2004 | (Canada) Calgary and Edmonton | Māori | Canada | No competition | New Zealand |
| 2005 | (Canada) Edmonton | England A | United States | No competition | No competition |
| 2006 | (Canada) Edmonton, Toronto, Ottawa (United States) San Jose (Santa Clara) | Māori | Ireland A | Canada | No competition |
| 2007 | (England) Stockport, Exeter, Henley, Northampton and London | England Saxons | Ireland A | Canada | No competition |
| 2008 | (Canada) Ottawa, Kingston, Toronto (United States) Chicago | England Saxons | Ireland A | Canada | No competition |
| 2009 | (United States) Glendale and Commerce City | Ireland A | Argentina XV | United States | No competition |
| 2010 | (United States) Glendale and Harrison | England Saxons | France A | Russia | No competition |
| 2011 | (England) Northampton, Gloucester, Esher, and Worcester | England Saxons | Italy A | United States | No competition |

- No Plate awarded in 2004 or 2005. Those were played as consolation finals.

For detailed results from a given year's competition (including the current year's), please see the relevant year's tournament's article.

== Early history ==
The Churchill Cup event, named after former British prime minister Winston Churchill, "Britain's Man of the Century", sees a five-year agreement amongst England, Canada and the US with each forming part of the new company, "Churchill Cup Inc.". Former Prime Minister Churchill shared close ties with the United States - his mother was American - and obviously with Canada during the Second World War, so it is fitting that this tournament bears his name.

== Concept ==
Born of an English tour of North America in 2001, the Churchill Cup of Rugby came to fruition in 2003, in Vancouver. The tournament arises out of a 5-year agreement between Rugby Canada, Rugby USA and the Rugby Football Union (England) to hold an annual rugby tournament in North America originally intended to be played between the nations Senior Men's and Women's sides. Canada will host the event from 2003 to 2005, in 2003 and 2004 the event was held in Edmonton, Alberta. While the US will have the option of picking up hosting the last two years of the tournament in 2006 and 2007, with the advent of the USA Sevens in San Diego and the reality of moving such an event, it is entirely likely that the event will remain in Canada, specifically Edmonton, through 2007. With respect to the Women's component, with Canada being awarded the 2006 Women's World Cup of Rugby, to be played in Edmonton and the Ottawa/Montreal region, it was felt that for 2005 and 2006 the Women's component should be removed, with the Women playing in the Canada Cup of Women's Rugby in Ottawa/Montreal in July 2005 and the Women's World Cup itself in September 2006 in Edmonton and Ottawa/Montreal.

In addition to the changes with respect to the Women's component, in 2004 the decision was made to expand the competition to four Nations with the inclusion of an invitational side, which in 2004 was the New Zealand Maori, who won the title in a spectacular overtime match with England. In 2005 Argentina were invited and sent their A side, which provided great entertainment for the fans and a true test of rugby for the founding Nations in the Churchill Cup. Beyond 2005 there was talk of further expanding the event to perhaps six Nations, with three invitational sides participating. This expansion indeed occurred in 2006.

== Purpose ==
North American rugby has often despaired in the lack of high quality competition in the continent. As other countries participate in the annual Tri-Nations or Six Nations tournaments, Canada and the US are left to schedule one off invitational games with other Nations, subject to other nations being able to accommodate such games in their schedules. In the Men's competition, the middle-power Canadian and American sides were able to test their mettle against some of the best players England and Ireland had to offer, and later New Zealand and Argentina with the inclusion of an invitational side. The competition also allowed England and Ireland to develop players who did not regularly participate in the national squad.

== Logistics ==
The 2003 inaugural tournament was played in Vancouver at Thunderbird Stadium. The 2004 Churchill Cup traveled east across the Canadian Rockies to Alberta where games were played in Calgary on the opening weekend and Edmonton for the finals. For 2005 the Churchill Cup was played entirely at Edmonton's 60,000 seat Commonwealth Stadium. The same was initially contemplated for 2006 and 2007, but that plan changed due to the expansion of the tournament in 2006 and logistical issues related to the 2007 Rugby World Cup.

== Teams ==
The three founding members (Rugby Canada, USA Rugby and England Saxons) were permanently placed in the Churchill Cup with three additional teams selected for each tournament year.

- Canada (first team) : 2003–2011
- United States (first team) : 2003–2011
- England Saxons (second team) : 2003–2011

The other teams:

- Argentina XV (second or third team, depending on year) : 2005, 2008–2009
- France A (second team) : 2010
- Ireland A (second team) : 2006–2009
- Georgia (first team) : 2009
- Italy A (second team) : 2011
- Māori (consisting of New Zealand players of Māori heritage) : 2004, 2006–2007
- Russia (first team) : 2010–2011
- Scotland A (second team) : 2006–2008
- Tonga (first team) : 2011
- Uruguay (first team) : 2010

== All Time Results Table ==
| Nation | Number of appearances | Games | Wins | Losses | Best result |
|---|---|---|---|---|---|
| Argentina XV | 3 | 8 | 4 | 4 | Runner-Up: 2005 |
| Canada | 9 | 24 | 9 | 15 | Runner-Up: 2010, 2011 |
| England Saxons | 9 | 25 | 21 | 4 | Champion: 2003, 2005, 2007, 2008, 2010, 2011 |
| France A | 1 | 3 | 2 | 1 | Plate Champion 2010 |
| Georgia | 1 | 3 | 0 | 3 | 6th Place: 2009 |
| Ireland A | 4 | 12 | 9 | 3 | Champion: 2009 |
| Italy A | 1 | 3 | 2 | 1 | Plate Champion: 2011 |
| Māori | 3 | 8 | 7 | 1 | Champion: 2004, 2006 |
| Russia | 2 | 6 | 1 | 5 | Bowl Champion: 2010 |
| Scotland A | 3 | 9 | 5 | 4 | Runner-Up: 2006, 2008 |
| Tonga | 1 | 3 | 1 | 2 | 4th Place: 2011 |
| United States | 9 | 25 | 5 | 20 | Runner-Up: 2003 |
| Uruguay | 1 | 3 | 0 | 3 | 6th Place: 2010 |

== Locations ==
- Commonwealth Stadium - Edmonton, Alberta, Canada

Located in Edmonton, the capital city of Alberta, Commonwealth Stadium is the venue for the Barclays Churchill Cup finals. Commonwealth is also the home of the Canadian Football League's Edmonton Eskimos.

- Buck Shaw Stadium - Santa Clara, California (San Francisco Bay Area)

Named after former Santa Clara football coach, Lawrence T. "Buck" Shaw. The stadium has seen many of that university sporting's achievements. Serving as the home for the Bronco soccer team, the 6,800-seat facility also housed Santa Clara baseball and football historically. Since 2008, it has also been home to the San Jose Earthquakes of Major League Soccer.

- Twin Elm Rugby Park - Ottawa

With five rugby fields, 12 changing rooms, two lounges, a bar and spectator seating for hundreds of people Twin Elm Rugby Park is situated in South Nepean, in the City of Ottawa. The facility is home to several local clubs, including the Ottawa Harlequins, the representative side for Eastern Ontario.

- York Stadium - Toronto
- Toyota Park - Bridgeview, Illinois (Chicago area)

Home of the Chicago Fire Soccer Club. Hosted the final of the Churchill Cup in 2008

- Infinity Park - Glendale, Colorado (Denver area)

A multi-use facility including a 5,000-seat rugby stadium currently used by the Glendale Raptors. Used for all pool matches in 2009 and 2010.

- Dick's Sporting Goods Park - Commerce City, Colorado (Denver area)

Home of the Colorado Rapids soccer team. Hosted all the finals of the 2009 Churchill Cup.

- Red Bull Arena - Harrison, New Jersey (New York City area)

Home of the New York Red Bulls soccer team. Hosted all finals in the 2010 Churchill Cup.

== Media coverage ==
In Australia the Churchill Cup is broadcast on Setanta Sports. In recent years with the tournament in Glendale, CO many games have been broadcast on delay on Fox Sports Rocky Mountain. In 2010 NBC covered the Cup and Plate finals live on NBC Universal.
