= 2003 Churchill Cup =

- Date: 14 June – 28 June 2003
- Countries: Canada; England Saxons; United States

Final positions
- Champions: England (1st title)

Tournament statistics
- Matches played: 4

The 2003 Churchill Cup was held between 14 June and 28 June 2003 in Vancouver, British Columbia, Canada. It was the inaugural year of the Churchill Cup. Three rugby union teams took part in the men's competition: Canada, England A and the USA.

A women's event involving the same teams also formed part of the event. This article concerns the men's event.

== Format ==
The teams played each other once in a round robin format, before the top two teams played in the Churchill Cup final.

== Results ==
=== Round-robin results ===
2003-06-14
16:30

England A	43 – 7	Canada

Vancouver

2003-06-18
16:30

Canada	11 – 16	United States

Vancouver

2003-06-21
16:30

England A	36 – 10	United States

Vancouver

Place	Nation	Games				Points			Table points
Place	Nation	Played	Won	Drawn	Lost	For	Against	Difference	Table points
1	England A	2	2	0	0	79	17	+62	4
2	United States	2	1	0	1	26	47	-21	2
3	Canada	2	0	0	2	18	59	-41	0

==== 2003 Churchill Cup Final ====
2003-06-28
16:30

England A	43 – 6	United States
	Report

Thunderbird Stadium, Vancouver

== See also ==
- Churchill Cup
- Women's Churchill Cup 2003
