= Glendale, Colorado =

City in Colorado, United States

- Home rule municipality
- City of Glendale
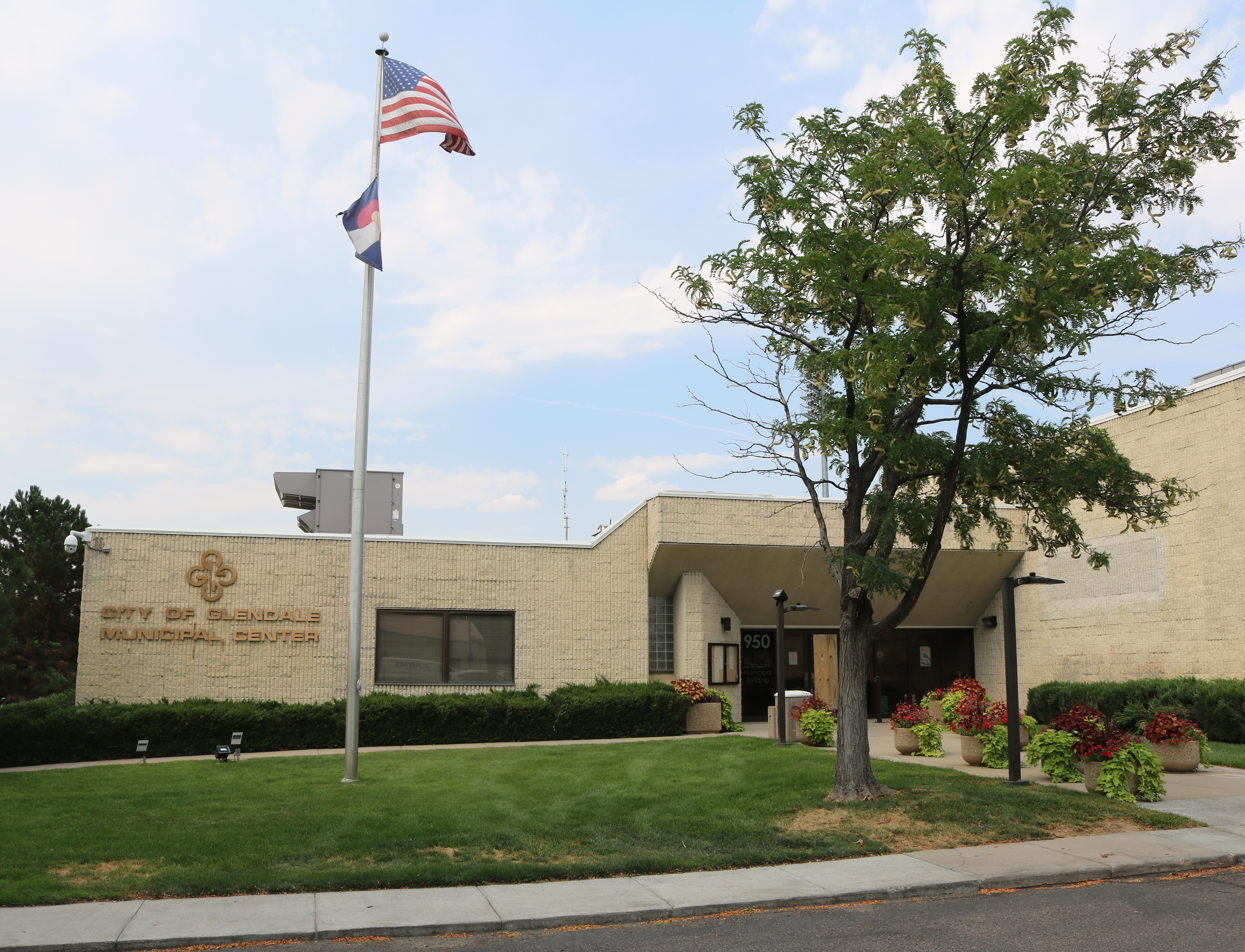
- The City of Glendale Municipal Center

- Seal
- Motto: The Heartbeat of Metro Denver
- Location of the City of Glendale in Arapahoe County, Colorado
- Coordinates: 39°42′13″N 104°56′07″W
- Country: United States
- State: Colorado
- County: Arapahoe County
- Settled: 1859
- Incorporated: May 19, 1952

Government
  - Type: Home Rule Municipality

Area
  - Total: 0.571 sq mi (1.478 km^{2})
  - Land: 0.568 sq mi (1.472 km^{2})
  - Water: 0.0023 sq mi (0.006 km^{2})
- Elevation: 5,351 ft (1,631 m)

Population (2020)
  - Total: 4,613
  - Density: 8,117/sq mi (3,134/km^{2})
- Time zone: UTC−07:00 (MST)
  - Summer (DST): UTC−06:00 (MDT)
- Zip code: 80246
- Area codes: Both 303 and 720
- FIPS code: 08-30340
- GNIS feature ID: 2410598
- Website: www.glendale.co.us

The City of Glendale is a home rule municipality located in an exclave of Arapahoe County, Colorado, United States. The city population was 4,613 at the 2020 United States census. Glendale is an enclave of the City and County of Denver and is the most densely populated municipality in Colorado. The city is a part of the Denver-Aurora-Centennial, CO Metropolitan Statistical Area and the Front Range Urban Corridor.

Glendale's fire and medical services have been provided by the Denver Fire Department and Denver Paramedics through a contract with the City and County of Denver since 2005. Glendale is policed by the Glendale Police Department.

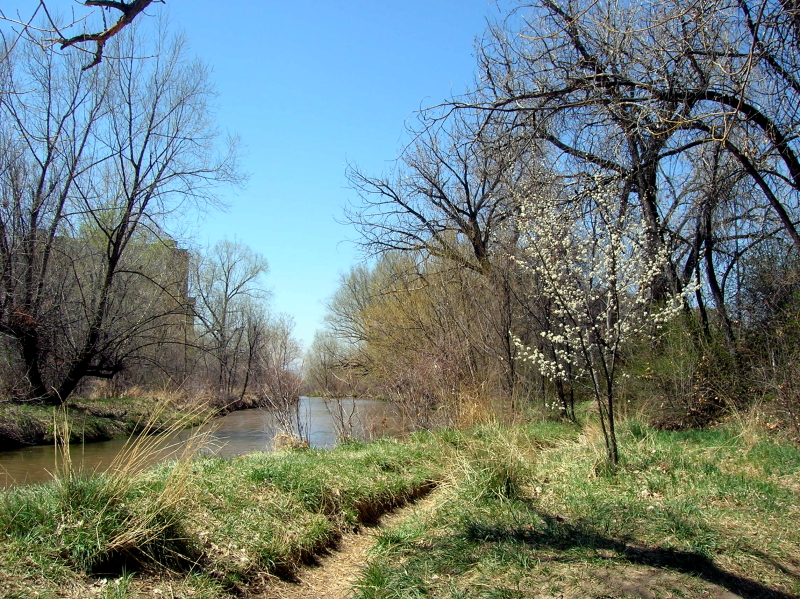
A view looking west down Cherry Creek

== History ==
In 1859, the Cherokee Trail (and the Smoky Hill Trail -south branch) came down Cherry Creek Valley past the Four Mile House and through what is now called Glendale. The Four Mile House was one of the stage stops along the road, becoming a way station for freight wagons and a stock ranch.

The first documented use of the name Glendale was the Glendale Grange, which was organized in December 1896. J.M. and Agnes Riddle helped to found and donated land for a new Grange Hall that was completed in 1897. In 1902, William Harold Baumert named his dairy the Glendale Farm Dairy which solidified the term Glendale which is now used to describe the community.

A fossil was found in 1937 in the sands of the bed of Cherry Creek—the first evidence of prehistoric animals. Later that year, an upper molar of a mammoth was found and donated to Denver's Museum of Natural History.

The original filing for incorporation of the Town of Glendale was incorporated January 8, 1952. The first Organizational Meeting of the Trustees of the Town of Glendale was held May 20, 1952. The citizens of the Glendale community wanted their voices to be heard fearing annexation from their large neighbor Denver and the loss of independence.

=== Sister cities ===
- Playa del Carmen, Mexico

== Geography ==
At the 2020 United States census, the city had a total area of 365 acres (1.478 km^{2}) including 1.5 acres (0.006 km^{2}) of water. Much of the city's limited space is devoted to commercial development, including both office and residential high rises.

== Demographics ==
Historical population
Census	Pop.	Note	%±
1960	468		—
1970	765		63.5%
1980	2,496		226.3%
1990	2,453		−1.7%
2000	4,547		85.4%
2010	4,184		−8.0%
2020	4,613		10.3%
U.S. Decennial Census

=== 2020 census ===
As of the 2020 census, Glendale had a population of 4,613. The median age was 30.2 years. 9.6% of residents were under the age of 18 and 4.3% of residents were 65 years of age or older. For every 100 females there were 102.8 males, and for every 100 females age 18 and over there were 102.5 males age 18 and over.

100.0% of residents lived in urban areas, while 0.0% lived in rural areas.

There were 2,806 households in Glendale, of which 10.7% had children under the age of 18 living in them. Of all households, 14.5% were married-couple households, 37.1% were households with a male householder and no spouse or partner present, and 35.6% were households with a female householder and no spouse or partner present. About 53.1% of all households were made up of individuals and 4.4% had someone living alone who was 65 years of age or older.

There were 3,106 housing units, of which 9.7% were vacant. The homeowner vacancy rate was 0.0% and the rental vacancy rate was 9.0%.

Racial composition as of the 2020 census
Race	Number	Percent
White	3,009	65.2%
Black or African American	277	6.0%
American Indian and Alaska Native	56	1.2%
Asian	175	3.8%
Native Hawaiian and Other Pacific Islander	5	0.1%
Some other race	476	10.3%
Two or more races	615	13.3%
Hispanic or Latino (of any race)	1,124	24.4%

=== 2000 census ===
As of the 2000 census, there were 4,547 people, 2,630 households, and 715 families residing in the city. Almost all of the housing in the city is multi-family. The population density was 8,241.3 inhabitants per square mile (3,182.0/km^{2}). There were 2,787 housing units at an average density of 5,051.4 units per square mile (1,950.4 units/km^{2}).

The racial makeup of the city was 68.15% White, 9.70% African American, 0.86% Native American, 6.20% Asian, 0.15% Pacific Islander, 9.10% from other races, and 5.83% from two or more races. Hispanic or Latino of any race were 27.38% of the population.

There were 2,630 households, out of which 12.9% had children under the age of 18 living with them, 17.2% were married couples living together, 5.7% had a female householder with no husband present, and 72.8% were non-families. 57.8% of all households were made up of individuals, and 2.4% had someone living alone who was 65 years of age or older. The average household size was 1.73 and the average family size was 2.86.

In the city, the population was spread out, with 13.3% under the age of 18, 21.2% from 18 to 24, 50.4% from 25 to 44, 12.5% from 45 to 64, and 2.6% who were 65 years of age or older. The median age was 28 years. For every 100 females, there were 117.9 males. For every 100 females age 18 and over, there were 115.5 males.

The median income for a household in the city was $29,043, and the median income for a family was $29,521. Males had a median income of $27,674 versus $28,050 for females. The per capita income for the city was $20,838. About 20.1% of families and 17.2% of the population were below the poverty line, including 29.6% of those under age 18 and 8.9% of those age 65 or over.

=== Households and housing ===
More than 80% of the population are renters, and many live in housing units built in the 1970s. More than 40% of Glendale's housing units were built in the 1970s.

== Sports venues ==
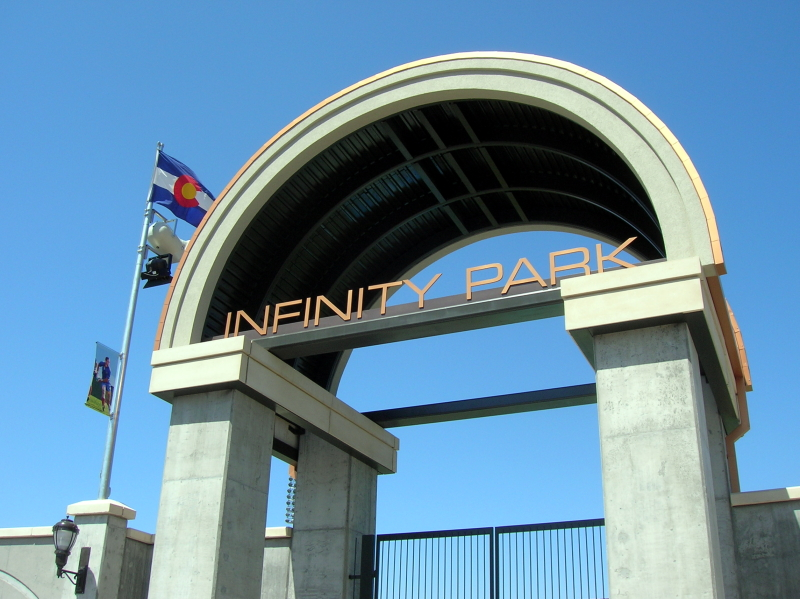
The entrance to Infinity Park

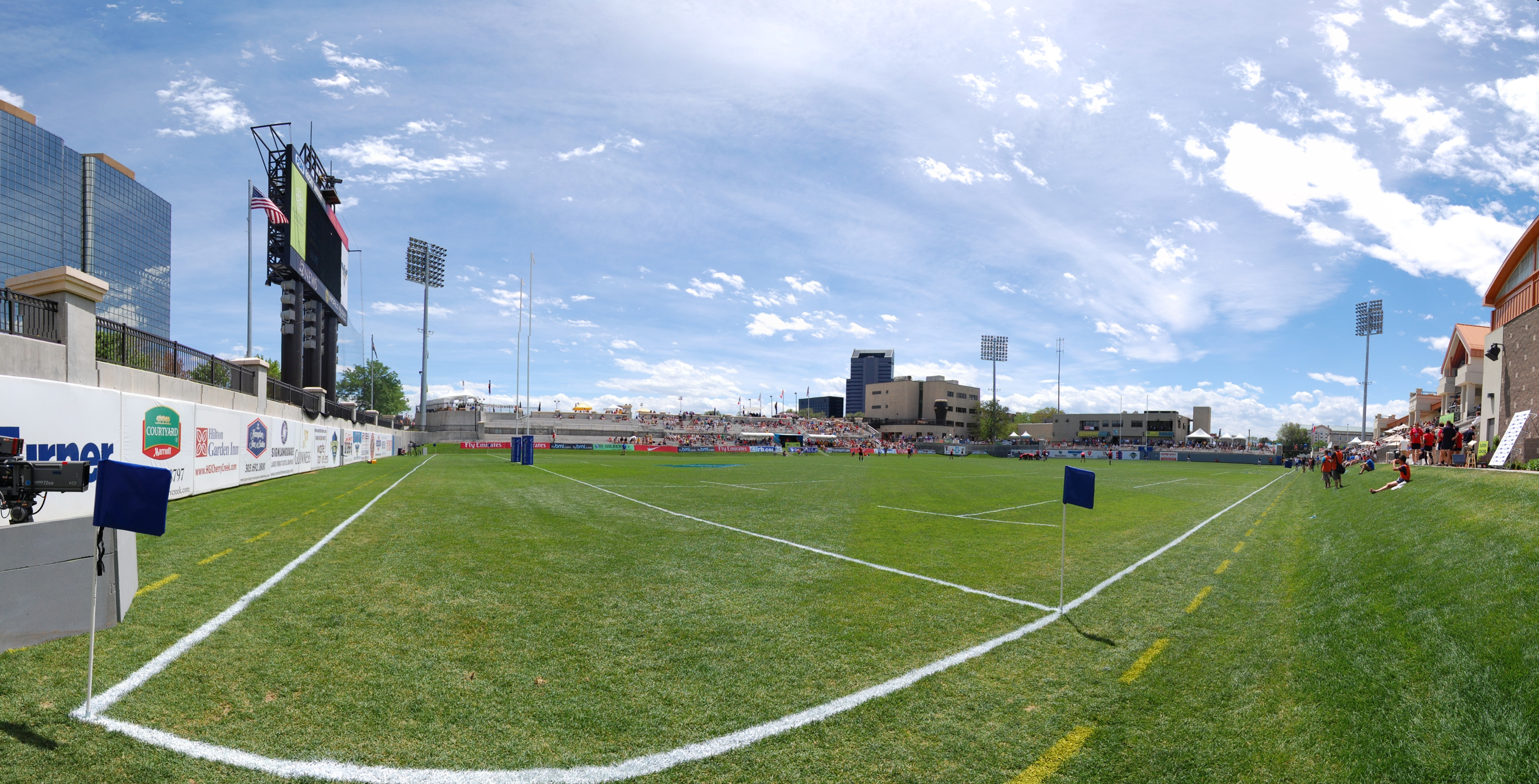
Inside the rugby stadium at Infinity Park

Infinity Park is an event sports and entertainment complex adjacent to the Glendale municipal buildings and courthouse. The nearly 16 acres of Infinity Park are located between Cherry Street and Birch Street, and between East Kentucky Avenue and East Mississippi Avenue, and include an event center, stadium, park, sports center and high-altitude training center.

In 2007, Glendale completed the first phase of construction when it opened the first municipal U.S. Rugby Stadium. The rugby stadium has a seating capacity of 4,000 people. The rugby stadium is home to the city's nationally ranked and 2011 D1 Champion rugby team known as the Colorado Raptors and the Women's Premier League's latest members, the Glendale Lady Raptors. The facility has become one of the premier rugby venues in the United States. It regularly hosts USA Rugby national championship matches and has also played host to the Churchill Cup in 2009 and 2010 which is the premier North American International Rugby Tournament.

In July 2008, the city opened a 35,000-square-foot (3,300 m^{2}) recreation and sports center that is managed by the YMCA of Metropolitan Denver. In November 2008, the state-of-the-art event center opened with accommodation for 750 guests in a banquet-style setting. The park, an 8-acre open-space development adjacent to and just south of the stadium, opened in May 2010. The high-altitude training center was completed in February 2011, the final phase of the Infinity Park project.

== Points of interest ==
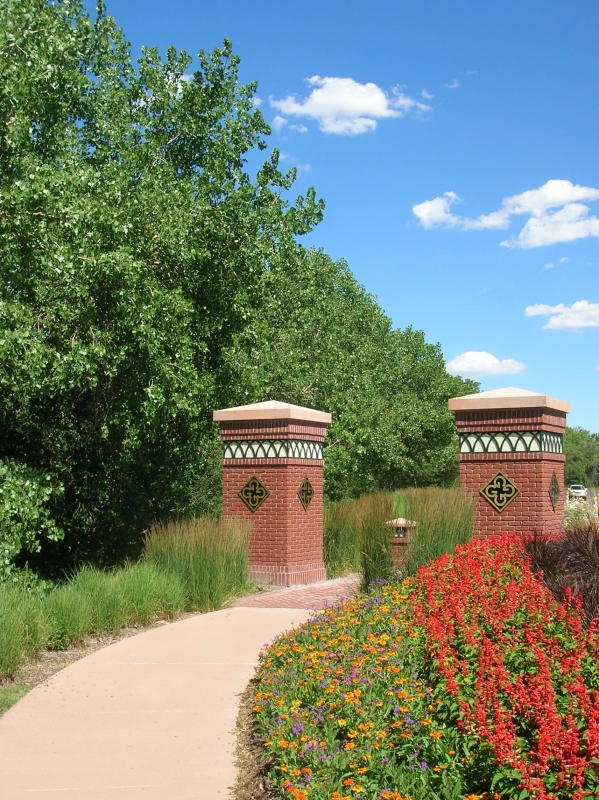
A walkway between Cherry Creek and Cherry Creek S Dr., east of Cherry St.

=== Four Mile House ===
An interesting site on the edge of Glendale is Four Mile Historic Park. This 12-acre (49,000 m^{2}) rural site is home to metropolitan Denver's oldest house, the Four Mile House, which is listed on the National Register of Historic Places. Built in 1859 along Cherry Creek, the Four Mile House once served as a stage stop, wayside inn, and tavern for travelers on their way to Denver City via the Cherokee Trail. Today Four Mile Historic Park houses a museum, summer camp, and events center. The park is situated just outside Glendale's city limits, in the Washington Virginia Vale neighborhood of Denver.

=== Green spaces ===
Green spaces include Cherry Creek Trail, Creekside Park, Mir Park and Playa del Carmen Park.

=== Entertainment ===
Glendale was formerly home to Celebrity Sports Center, a local landmark and family activity center established by Walt Disney and other celebrity investors. The landmark closed in 1994 to the disappointment of many.

== Education ==
The school district is Cherry Creek School District 5.

Zoned schools are The Cottage School (preschool), Holly Ridge Primary School (kindergarten through grade 2), Holly Hills Elementary School (grades 3-5), West Middle School, and Cherry Creek High School. The preschool and elementary schools are in Holly Hills. The middle and high school are in Greenwood Village.

== Notable person ==
Notable individuals who were born or have lived in Glendale include:

- Steve Ward (b.1960), Colorado state legislator, mayor of Glendale

== Gallery ==
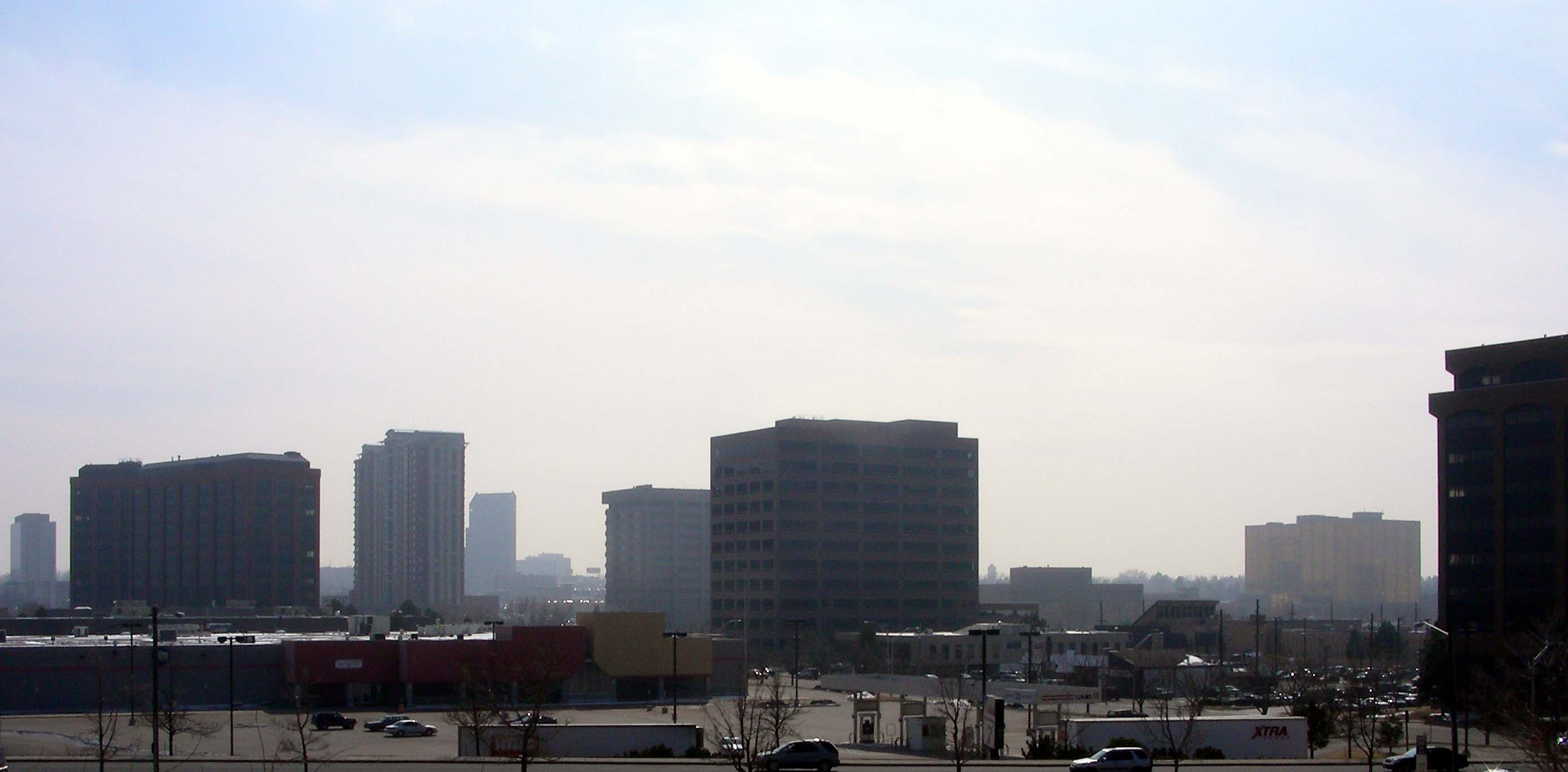
City of Glendale, View from North to south

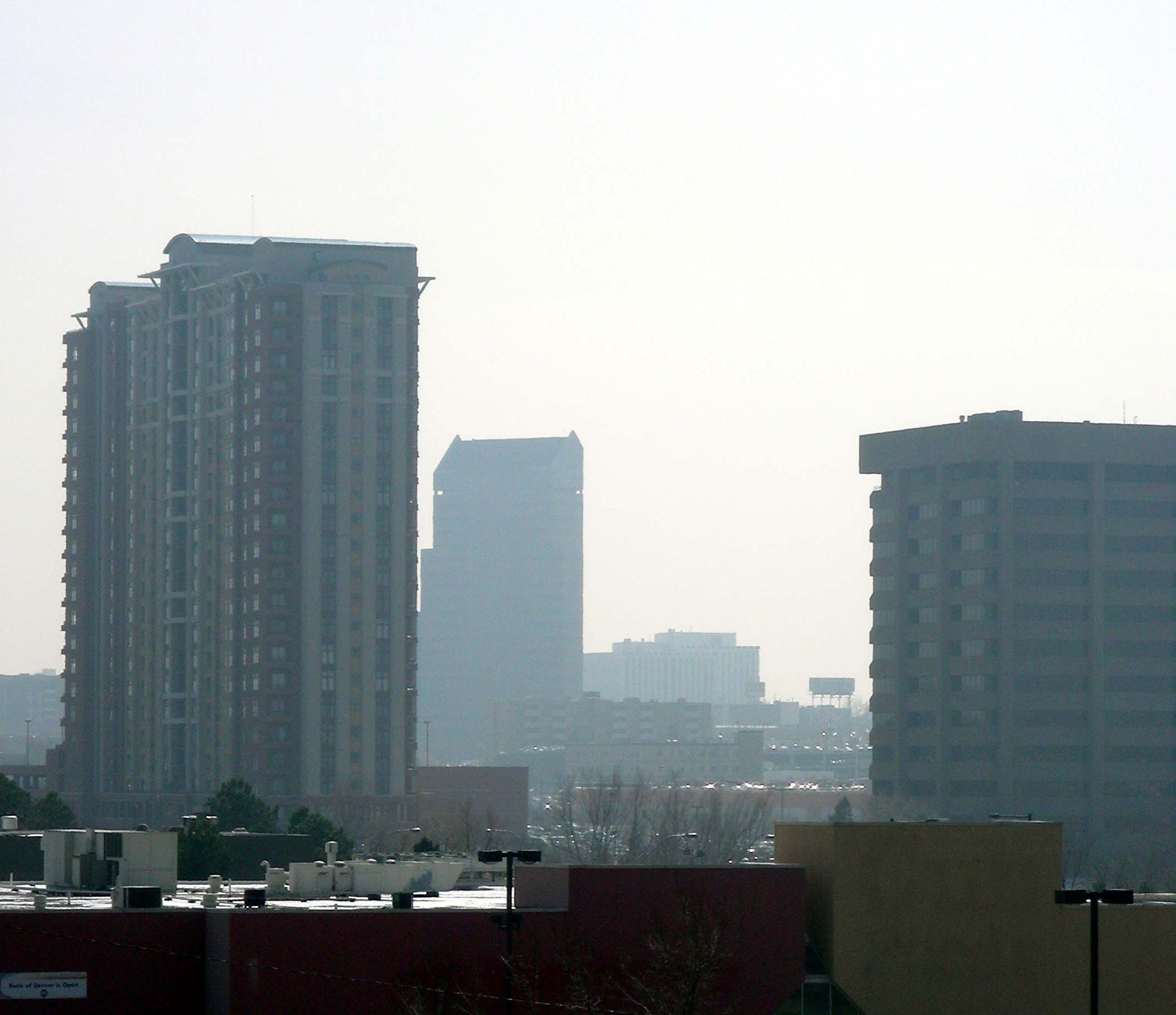
View of southern half of Glendale

== See also ==
- Front Range Urban Corridor
