= Pacific Rim Rugby Championship =

International rugby union tournament

Pacific Rim Championship
- Epson Cup logo introduced in 1999
- Sport: Rugby union
- First season: 1996; 30 years ago
- Folded: 2001; 25 years ago
- No. of teams: 6
- Last champion: Fiji (2001)
- Most titles: Canada (3 times)

The Pacific Rim Rugby Championship, also known as the Epson Cup for sponsorship purposes, was an international rugby union tournament contested by national teams from around the Pacific. The championship was held annually between 1996 and 2001.

The competition was run by the International Rugby Board. In the first three tournaments, Canada, United States, Japan and Hong Kong competed for the championship. The competition was expanded to six teams in 1999 with the Pacific Tri-Nations teams Fiji, Samoa and Tonga replacing Hong Kong for the last three tournaments.

== Tournament winners ==
Year	Winner	Runner-up	Third place	Refs
1996	Canada	Hong Kong	United States	
1997	Canada	Hong Kong	Japan	
1998	Canada	Hong Kong	United States	
1999	Japan	Western Samoa	United States	
2000	Fiji	Western Samoa	Tonga	
2001	Fiji	Western Samoa	Japan	

== Successor events ==
The Epson Cup series ended at the completion of the original sponsorship deal, but the Pacific Tri-Nations tournament continued for the next three years until the IRB expanded that competition to form the Pacific Nations Cup in 2006 (also known as the Pacific Six Nations).

The Pacific Nations Cup, including Japan, Fiji, Samoa and Tonga, was expanded again in 2012 with Canada and the United States joining the competition.

The United States, Russia, China, Japan, and eventually Canada and Romania, played in the Super Powers Cup (later renamed the Super Cup) from 2003 to 2005.

== See also ==
- Pacific Nations Cup
- Super Cup
