= 2004 Churchill Cup =

- Date: 14 June – 21 June 2004
- Countries: Canada; England Saxons; New Zealand Māori; United States

Final positions
- Champions: Māori (1st title)

Tournament statistics
- Matches played: 4

The 2004 Churchill Cup was held between 14 June and 21 June 2004 in Calgary and Edmonton, Canada. It was the second edition of the Churchill Cup competition. The three original rugby union teams taking part in the men's competition: Canada, England A and the USA, were joined by the New Zealand Maori.

A women's competition, involving the same teams, took place alongside the men's event.

== Format ==
The competition took on a straight 'knock-out' format. Four teams played in two semi-final matches, with the North American sides kept apart. The winners of each semi final competed in the final match, while the losers took part in a 3rd/4th place playoff. Four matches were played over a period of two weeks.

== Results ==
=== Semi-finals ===
2004-06-14
16:30

England A	48 – 23	Canada

Calgary, Canada

2004-06-14
16:30

Māori	69 – 31	United States
	Report

Calgary, Canada

=== Final ===
2004-06-21
16:30

England A	19 – 26	Māori

Edmonton, Canada

- after extra time

=== Consolation final ===
2004-06-21
16:30

Canada	32 – 29	United States
	Report

Commonwealth Stadium, Edmonton, Canada
Attendance: 5,000

== See also ==
- Churchill Cup
