= Twin Elm Rugby Park =

Sports venue in Ottawa, Ontario, Canada

Coordinates: 45.203700°N 75.795386°W

Twin Elm Rugby Park is a sports venue in South Nepean, Ottawa, Ontario, Canada.

The park is a non for profit sports venue that was incorporated in 1973. It is owned by 4 rugby clubs and is operated by volunteers.

With five rugby fields and 12 changing rooms, two lounges, a bar and spectator seating for approximately 3,000 people it can accommodate several concurrent matches and serves as the home of several local clubs. The Eastern Ontario Selects play their home games at the venue, and also hosts a number of national and international games. In addition to rugby, the park is also home to other sports such as soccer, lacrosse, ultimate Frisbee and volleyball.
