= PARA Pan American Championship =

International rugby union competition

- Sport: Rugby union
- Founded: 1995
- No. of teams: 4
- Country: Argentina; Canada; United States; Uruguay
- Most recent champion: Argentina (5th title)
- Most titles: Argentina (5 titles)

The Pan American Championship (Spanish: Torneo Panamericano de Rugby) was the major international rugby tournament held in the Americas, hosted irregularly on five occasions from 1995 to 2003. The tournament was organized by the Pan American Rugby Association (PARA) and included the World Cup teams of Argentina, Canada and Uruguay in 1995, joined by the United States from 1996 onwards. Argentina won all five of the tournaments.

== Results ==
Year	Host	Winner	Runner-up	Third	Fourth
1995	Argentina/ Uruguay	Argentina	Canada	Uruguay	
1996	Canada	Argentina	Canada	United States	Uruguay
1998	Argentina	Argentina	Canada	United States	Uruguay
2001	Canada	Argentina	Canada	United States	Uruguay
2003	Argentina	Argentina	United States	Canada	Uruguay

== See also ==
- Americas Rugby Championship
