= Super Cup (rugby union) =

International sporting competition

Toshiba Super Cup
- Logo introduced for the 2005 tournament
- Sport: Rugby union
- First season: 2003
- Folded: 2005

The Super Cup or Super Powers Cup was an international rugby union competition contested from 2003 to 2005. It featured teams representing Canada, Japan, Russia, the United States and Romania.

== Tournaments ==
=== 2003 ===
| Date | Winner | Score | Loser |
|---|---|---|---|
| May | United States | 69–27 | Japan |
| May | Russia | 43–34 | Japan |
| July | Russia | 30–21 | USA Selects |

The Super Powers Cup was first launched in 2003. It was planned that China, Japan, Russia and the United States would play each other once. However, because of the SARS outbreak the Chinese team were forced to withdraw.

Russia won the inaugural 2003 competition, defeating the United States 30–21 in Krasnoyarsk, Russia.

=== 2004 ===
| Date | Winner | Score | Loser |
|---|---|---|---|
| 27 May | Canada | 23–20 | United States |
| 27 May | Japan | 29–12 | Russia |
| 30 May | Japan | 34–21 | Canada |
| 30 May | United States | 41–11 | Russia |

For the 2004 competition Canada joined the competition. In May of that year Japan won the second edition of the Super Powers Cup in Tokyo, where the entire tournament had been staged, beating Russia 29–12 and Canada 34–21 in the process. The United States defeated Russia in the third-place playoff.

=== 2005 ===
| Date | Winner | Score | Loser |
|---|---|---|---|
| 25 May | Canada | 30–26 | United States |
| 25 May | Japan | 23–16 | Romania |
| 29 May | Canada | 15–10 | Japan |
| 29 May | United States | 28–22 | Romania |

In 2005 the tournament was renamed the Super Cup and the participants were again changed, with Romania taking the place of Russia. Romania had been given 'second tier' status by the International Rugby Board (IRB), meaning greater funding and integration into the international calendar, while Russia were at the time considered a third tier nation.

Canada and Japan met in the final, with the Canadians winning 15–10. The United States beat a Romanian team missing many of their France-based professionals 23–16 in the third place play-off.

== Dissolution ==
The competition was discontinued in 2005 after the IRB undertook a new Strategic Investment programme, with funding instead going to several new tournaments including the Pacific Nations Cup, featuring Japan (since 2006), Canada and United States (since 2013), as well as the IRB Nations Cup and IRB Tbilisi Cup, involving European, African and South American teams.

In February 2009, representatives from the IRB, Rugby Canada, the Japan Rugby Football Union, the Rugby Union of Russia and USA Rugby met to discuss the possibility of reviving the tournament under the Super Powers Cup name, beginning in November 2010, but nothing materialized.

== Honours ==
| Year | Winner | Tournament location | Refs |
|---|---|---|---|
| 2003 | Russia | San Francisco, Tokyo, Krasnoyarsk | |
| 2004 | Japan | Tokyo | |
| 2005 | Canada | Tokyo | |
