= List of United States national rugby union team test match results =

This page lists all international test matches played by the USA Eagles.

== Overall record ==
Representative rugby matches played by the United States national XV at test level up to November 14, 2026.
Opponent	Played	Won	Lost	Drawn	Win %	For	Against	Diff
Argentina	9	0	9	0	0%	136	294	−158
Argentina Jaguars	1	0	1	0	0%	30	34	−4
Australia	8	0	8	0	0%	78	368	−290
Australia XV	1	0	1	0	0%	22	26	−4
Barbados	1	1	0	0	100%	91	0	+91
Belgium	1	1	0	0	100%	36	17	+19
Bermuda	1	1	0	0	100%	60	3	+57
Brazil	5	4	1	0	80%	200	74	+126
Canada	68	25	41	2	36.76%	1,262	1,566	−304
Chile	8	6	2	0	75%	336	125	+211
England	8	0	8	0	0%	93	381	−288
England XV	2	0	2	0	0%	11	96	−85
England A	4	0	4	0	0%	29	194	−165
Fiji	7	1	6	0	14.29%	100	165	−65
France	8	1	7	0	12.5%	102	214	−112
France XV	1	1	0	0	100%	8	0	+8
Georgia	8	3	5	0	37.5%	183	182	+1
Germany	1	1	0	0	100%	46	17	+29
Hong Kong	9	5	4	0	55.56%	229	224	+5
Ireland	11	0	11	0	0%	125	489	−364
Ireland XV	1	0	1	0	0%	7	32	−25
Ireland Wolfhounds	2	0	2	0	0%	22	74	−52
Italy	5	0	5	0	0%	74	154	−80
Japan	27	13	13	1	48.15%	734	711	+23
Kenya	1	1	0	0	100%	68	14	+54
New Zealand	4	0	4	0	0%	29	275	−246
New Zealand XV	1	0	1	0	0%	6	53	−47
Māori	1	0	1	0	0%	6	74	−68
Portugal	6	4	1	1	66.67%	170	130	+40
Romania	13	10	3	0	76.92%	360	185	+175
Russia	8	8	0	0	100%	280	110	+170
Samoa	9	3	6	0	33.33%	170	187	−17
Scotland	8	1	7	0	12.5%	103	376	−273
Scotland XV	1	0	1	0	0%	12	41	−29
Scotland A	1	0	1	0	0%	9	13	−4
South Africa	4	0	4	0	0%	42	209	−167
Soviet Union	1	0	1	0	0%	16	31	−15
Spain	7	6	1	0	85.71%	286	117	+169
Tonga	11	2	9	0	18.18%	189	289	−100
Tunisia	1	1	0	0	100%	47	13	+34
Uruguay	20	15	4	1	75%	612	364	+248
Wales	7	0	7	0	0%	86	305	−219
Wales XV	1	0	1	0	0%	18	24	−6
Zimbabwe	1	1	0	0	100%	31	15	+16
Total	303	115	183	5	37.95%	6,554	8,265	−1,711

== Results by decade ==
Below is table of decade results of representative rugby matches played by a United States national XV at test level up until November 14, 2026.

Decade	Matches				
Decade	P	W	D	L	%
1910s	3	1	0	2	33.33%
1920s	4	3	0	1	75%
1970s	6	1	0	5	16.67%
1980s	28	7	2	19	25%
1990s	63	21	0	42	33.33%
2000s	71	23	0	48	32.39%
2010s	86	39	2	45	45.35%
2020s	42	20	1	21	47.62%

== Team records ==
Team records
Longest winning streak	9	10 February 2018 – 17 November 2018
Longest losing streak	10	18 May 2007 – 21 June 2008
Largest points for	91	Barbados 1 July 2006
Largest points against	106	England 21 August 1999
Largest victory	91	United States 91–0 Barbados; 1 July 2006
Largest defeat	98	England 106–8 United States; 21 August 1999
Most combined points	118	United States 14–104 New Zealand; 23 October 2021
Fewest combined points	6	United States 3–3 Canada; 12 June 1982

== List of test matches ==
Below is a list of USA Eagles matches in which test caps were awarded. Refer to List of United States national rugby union players for a list of newly capped players.

No.	Date	Opponent	F	A	Venue	City	Attendance	Competition	Winner	Head coach	Ref.
1	November 16, 1912	Australia	8	12	California Field	Berkeley, California	10,000	Australia tour of North America	Australia	—N/a	
2	November 15, 1913	New Zealand	3	51	California Field	Berkeley, California	10,000	New Zealand tour of North America	New Zealand	—N/a	
3	June 26, 1919	Romania	21	0	Colombes Stadium	Paris, France		Inter-Allied Games	United States	—N/a	
4	September 5, 1920	France XV	8	0	Olympic Stadium	Antwerp, Belgium	55,000	1920 Olympics	United States	Harry Maloney (trainer/selector); Daniel Carroll (player/coach)	
5	October 10, 1920	France	5	14	Colombes Stadium	Paris, France	25,000	Test match	France	Harry Maloney (trainer/selector); Daniel Carroll (player/coach)	
6	May 11, 1924	Romania	37	0	Stade Olympique	Colombes, France		1924 Olympics	United States	Charles Austin	
7	May 18, 1924	France	17	3	Stade Olympique	Colombes, France	20,000	1924 Olympics	United States	Charles Austin	
8	January 31, 1976	Australia	12	24	Glover Field	Anaheim, California	7,000	Australia tour of Europe and USA	Australia	Dennis Storer	
9	June 12, 1976	France	14	33	New Trier High School	Chicago, Illinois	8,000	Test match	France	Dennis Storer; Ray Cornbill	
10	May 21, 1977	Canada	6	17	Swangard Stadium	Burnaby, British Columbia	6,000	Test match	Canada	Dennis Storer; Ray Cornbill	
11	October 15, 1977	England XV	11	37	Twickenham Stadium	Twickenham, England	15,000	United States tour of England	England XV	Dennis Storer; Ray Cornbill	
12	May 28, 1978	Canada	12	7	Burdick Field	Towson, Maryland		Test match	United States	Dennis Storer; Ray Cornbill	
13	June 9, 1979	Canada	12	19	Varsity Stadium	Toronto, Ontario		Test match	Canada	Dennis Storer; Ray Cornbill	
14	May 10, 1980	Wales XV	18	24	Veterans Memorial Stadium	Long Beach, California		Wales B tour of North America	Wales XV	Dennis Storer; Ray Cornbill	
15	June 8, 1980	Canada	0	16	North Country Community College	Saranac Lake, New York		Test match	Canada	Dennis Storer; Ray Cornbill	
16	October 8, 1980	New Zealand XV	6	53	San Diego Stadium	San Diego, California	14,000	New Zealand tour of North America and Wales	New Zealand XV	Dennis Storer; Ray Cornbill	
17	June 6, 1981	Canada	3	6	Kingsland Rugby Park	Calgary, Alberta		Test match	Canada	Dennis Storer; Ray Cornbill	
18	September 25, 1981	South Africa	7	38	Owl Creek Polo Field	Glenville, New York	150	South Africa tour of New Zealand and USA	South Africa	Dennis Storer; Ray Cornbill	
19	June 12, 1982	Canada	3	3	Bleecker Stadium	Albany, New York		Test match	Draw	Dennis Storer; Ray Cornbill	
20	June 19, 1982	England XV	0	59	Dillon Stadium	Hartford, Connecticut	9,000	England tour of North America	England XV	Dennis Storer; Ray Cornbill	
21	June 11, 1983	Canada	9	15	Swangard Stadium	Burnaby, British Columbia		Test match	Canada	Ron Mayes	
22	July 9, 1983	Australia	3	49	Sydney Cricket Ground	Moore Park, New South Wales	21,737	United States tour of Australia	Australia	Ron Mayes	
23	June 9, 1984	Canada	21	13	Rockne Stadium	Chicago, Illinois		Test match	United States	Ron Mayes	
24	April 21, 1985	Japan	16	15	Chichibunomiya Rugby Stadium	Minato, Tokyo	20,000	United States tour of Japan	United States	Ron Mayes	
25	November 16, 1985	Canada	10	21	Thunderbird Stadium	UBC Vancouver, British Columbia		Test match	Canada	Ron Mayes	
26	May 31, 1986	Japan	9	9	Murdock Stadium	Torrance, California	5,000	Japan tour of North America	Draw	Ron Mayes	
27	November 8, 1986	Canada	16	27	Arizona Stadium	Tucson, Arizona	4,500	Test match	Canada	Ron Mayes	
28	May 3, 1987	Tunisia	47	13		Pebble Beach, California		1987 World Cup warm-up match	United States	Ron Mayes	
29	May 10, 1987	Canada	9	33	Thunderbird Stadium	University Endowment Lands, British Columbia		1987 World Cup warm-up match	Canada	Ron Mayes	
30	May 24, 1987	Japan	21	18	Ballymore Stadium	Brisbane, Queensland	4,000	1987 World Cup Group Stage	United States	George Hook; Ron Mayes	
31	May 31, 1987	Australia	12	47	Ballymore Stadium	Brisbane, Queensland	10,855	1987 World Cup Group Stage	Australia	George Hook; Ron Mayes	
32	June 3, 1987	England	6	34	Concord Oval	Sydney, New South Wales	8,785	1987 Rugby World Cup Group Stage	England	George Hook; Ron Mayes	
33	November 7, 1987	Wales	0	46	Cardiff Arms Park	Cardiff, Wales	22,000	1987 United States tour of Wales	Wales	Jim Perkins	
34	November 14, 1987	Canada	12	20	Royal Athletic Park	Victoria, British Columbia		1987 United States tour of Wales and Canada	Canada	Jim Perkins	
35	June 11, 1988	Canada	28	16	North Country Community College	Saranac Lake, New York		Test match	United States	Jim Perkins	
36	September 17, 1988	Romania	17	7	Sparta Stadium	Moscow, USSR		Test match	United States	Jim Perkins	
37	September 25, 1988	Soviet Union	16	31	Sparta Stadium	Moscow, USSR		Test match	Soviet Union	Jim Perkins	
38	September 9, 1989	Ireland XV	7	32	Downing Stadium	New York City, New York		1989 Ireland tour of North America	Ireland XV	Jim Perkins	
39	September 23, 1989	Canada	3	21	Varsity Stadium	Toronto, Ontario		1991 World Cup qualifying	Canada	Jim Perkins	
40	November 5, 1989	Uruguay	60	6	Carrasco Polo Club	Montevideo, Uruguay		Test match	United States	Jim Perkins	
41	November 8, 1989	Argentina	6	23	José Amalfitani Stadium	Buenos Aires, Argentina	20,000	1991 World Cup qualifying	Argentina	Jim Perkins	
42	April 7, 1990	Argentina	6	13	Harder Stadium	Santa Barbara, California	8,000	1991 World Cup qualifying	Argentina	Jim Perkins	
43	June 9, 1990	Canada	14	12	Chief Sealth Stadium	Seattle, Washington		1991 World Cup qualifying	United States	Jim Perkins	
44	July 8, 1990	Australia	9	67	Ballymore Stadium	Brisbane, Queensland	11,928	United States tour of Australia	Australia	Jim Perkins	
45	September 23, 1990	Japan	25	15	Chichibunomiya Rugby Stadium	Minato, Tokyo	19,000	United States tour of Japan	United States	Jim Perkins	
46	April 27, 1991	Japan	20	9	National Sports Center	Blaine, Minnesota		Test match	United States	Jim Perkins	
47	May 4, 1991	Japan	27	15	Rockne Stadium	Chicago, Illinois		Test match	United States	Jim Perkins	
48	May 18, 1991	Scotland XV	12	41	Dillon Stadium	Hartford, Connecticut		Test match	Scotland XV	Jim Perkins	
49	June 8, 1991	Canada	15	34	Kingsland Rugby Park	Kingsland, Calgary		Test match	Canada	Jim Perkins	
50	July 13, 1991	France	9	41	Englewood High School	Englewood, Colorado	1,500	France tour of the United States	France	Jim Perkins	
51	July 20, 1991	France	3	10		Colorado Springs, Colorado	2,000	France tour of the United States	France	Jim Perkins	
52	October 5, 1991	Italy	9	30	Cross Green	Otley, England	7,500	1991 World Cup Group Stage	Italy	Jim Perkins	
53	October 8, 1991	New Zealand	6	46	Kingsholm Stadium	Kingsholm, Gloucester	12,000	1991 World Cup Group Stage	New Zealand	Jim Perkins	
54	October 11, 1991	England	9	37	Twickenham Stadium	Twickenham, England	45,000	1991 World Cup Group Stage	England	Jim Perkins	
55	April 18, 1992	Hong Kong	23	16	Kezar Stadium	San Francisco, California		Test match	United States	Clarence Culpepper	
56	June 13, 1992	Canada	9	32	Observatory Park	Denver, Colorado		Test match	Canada	Clarence Culpepper	
57	June 19, 1993	Canada	9	20	Maple Grove Park	Winnipeg, Manitoba		Test match	Canada	Jack Clark	
58	October 2, 1993	Australia XV	22	26		Riverside, California		1993 Australia tour of France and North America	Australia XV	Jack Clark	
59	March 12, 1994	Bermuda	60	3	Bermuda National Stadium	Devonshire Parish, Bermuda		1995 World Cup Qualifier	United States	Jack Clark	
60	May 21, 1994	Canada	10	15	George Allen Field	Long Beach, California		Test match	Canada	Jack Clark	
61	May 28, 1994	Argentina	22	28	George Allen Field	Long Beach, California		1995 World Cup Qualifier	Argentina	Jack Clark	
62	June 20, 1994	Argentina	11	16	Estadio Ferro Carril Oeste	Buenos Aires, Argentina		1995 World Cup Qualifier	Argentina	Jack Clark	
63	November 5, 1994	Ireland	15	26	Lansdowne Road	Dublin, Ireland		United States tour of Ireland	Ireland	Jack Clark	
64	September 9, 1995	Canada	15	14	Fletcher's Fields	Markham, Ontario		Test match	United States	Jack Clark	
65	January 7, 1996	Ireland	18	25	Life College	Marietta, Georgia		Test match	Ireland	Jack Clark	
66	May 11, 1996	Canada	19	12	Boxer Stadium	San Francisco, California	3,500	Pacific Rim Rugby Championship	United States	Jack Clark	
67	May 18, 1996	Canada	20	24	Thunderbird Stadium	University Endowment Lands, British Columbia		Pacific Rim Rugby Championship	Canada	Jack Clark	
68	June 9, 1996	Hong Kong	19	22	Hong Kong Stadium	Hong Kong		Pacific Rim Rugby Championship	Hong Kong	Jack Clark	
69	June 16, 1996	Japan	18	24	Chichibunomiya Rugby Stadium	Minato, Tokyo	6,500	Pacific Rim Rugby Championship	Japan	Jack Clark	
70	June 29, 1996	Hong Kong	42	23	Boxer Stadium	San Francisco, California	2,200	Pacific Rim Rugby Championship	United States	Jack Clark	
71	July 6, 1996	Japan	74	5	Boxer Stadium	San Francisco, California	2,500	Pacific Rim Rugby Championship	United States	Jack Clark	
72	September 14, 1996	Argentina	26	29	Twin Elm Rugby Park	Nepean, Ontario	1,500	PARA Pan American Championship	Argentina	Jack Clark	
73	September 18, 1996	Canada	18	23	Mohawk Sports Park	Hamilton, Ontario		PARA Pan American Championship	Canada	Jack Clark	
74	September 21, 1996	Uruguay	27	13	Fletcher's Fields	Markham, Ontario		PARA Pan American Championship	United States	Jack Clark	
75	January 11, 1997	Wales	14	34	Cardiff Arms Park	Cardiff, Wales	13,500	United States tour of Wales	Wales	Jack Clark	
76	May 10, 1997	Canada	12	53	Thunderbird Stadium	University Endowment Lands, British Columbia	5,000	1997 Pacific Rim Championship	Canada	Jack Clark	
77	May 18, 1997	Hong Kong	9	46	Aberdeen Sports Ground	Aberdeen, Hong Kong		1997 Pacific Rim Championship	Hong Kong	Jack Clark	
78	May 25, 1997	Japan	20	12	Hanazono Rugby Stadium	Higashiosaka, Osaka Prefecture	12,000	1997 Pacific Rim Championship	United States	Jack Clark	
79	June 7, 1997	Japan	51	29	Boxer Stadium	San Francisco, California	1,800	1997 Pacific Rim Championship	United States	Jack Clark	
80	June 14, 1997	Hong Kong	17	14	Boxer Stadium	San Francisco, California		1997 Pacific Rim Championship	United States	Jack Clark	
81	June 28, 1997	Canada	11	22	Boxer Stadium	San Francisco, California	1,800	1997 Pacific Rim Championship	Canada	Jack Clark	
82	July 5, 1997	Wales	20	30	Brook Fields	Wilmington, North Carolina		Wales tour of North America	Wales	Jack Clark	
83	July 12, 1997	Wales	23	28	Boxer Stadium	San Francisco, California	4,425	Wales tour of North America	Wales	Jack Clark	
84	April 8, 1998	Portugal	61	5	Lisbon University Stadium	Lisbon, Portugal		United States tour of Portugal and Spain	United States	Jack Clark	
85	April 12, 1998	Spain	49	3		El Puerto de Santa María		United States tour of Portugal and Spain	United States	Jack Clark	
86	May 10, 1998	Japan	38	27	Chichibunomiya Rugby Stadium	Minato, Tokyo	9,500	1998 Pacific Rim Championship	United States	Jack Clark	
87	May 16, 1998	Hong Kong	25	43	Aberdeen Sports Ground	Aberdeen, Hong Kong		1998 Pacific Rim Championship	Hong Kong	Jack Clark	
88	May 23, 1998	Canada	15	17	Thunderbird Stadium	University Endowment Lands, British Columbia		1998 Pacific Rim Championship	Canada	Jack Clark	
89	June 6, 1998	Canada	3	37		Burlington, Vermont	4,300	1998 Pacific Rim Championship	Canada	Jack Clark	
90	June 13, 1998	Japan	21	25	Boxer Stadium	San Francisco, California	1,800	1998 Pacific Rim Championship	Japan	Jack Clark	
91	June 20, 1998	Hong Kong	17	27	Boxer Stadium	San Francisco, California	1,300	1998 Pacific Rim Championship	Hong Kong	Jack Clark	
92	July 25, 1998	Fiji	9	18	National Stadium	Suva, Fiji	6,000	Test match	Fiji	Jack Clark	
93	August 15, 1998	Argentina	24	52	Cricket & Rugby Club	Buenos Aires, Argentina		1999 World Cup Qualifier	Argentina	Jack Clark	
94	August 18, 1998	Canada	14	31	Club Atlético San Isidro	Buenos Aires, Argentina	3,000	1999 World Cup Qualifier	Canada	Jack Clark	
95	August 22, 1998	Uruguay	21	16	Cricket and Rugby Club	Buenos Aires, Argentina	2,500	1999 World Cup Qualifier	United States	Jack Clark	
96	May 15, 1999	Tonga	30	10	Boxer Stadium	San Francisco, California	4,600	1999 Pacific Rim Championship	United States	Jack Clark	
97	May 22, 1999	Fiji	25	14	Boxer Stadium	San Francisco, California	3,950	1999 Pacific Rim Championship	United States	Jack Clark	
98	June 12, 1999	Japan	31	47	Kapiolani Park	Honolulu, Hawaii	3,900	1999 Pacific Rim Championship	Japan	Jack Clark	
99	June 19, 1999	Canada	18	17	Fletcher's Fields	Markham, Ontario	4,500	1999 Pacific Rim Championship	United States	Jack Clark	
100	June 26, 1999	Samoa	20	27	Apia Park	Apia, Samoa		1999 Pacific Rim Championship	Samoa	Jack Clark	
101	August 21, 1999	England	8	106	Twickenham Stadium	Twickenham, London	15,000	United States tour of Australia and Great Britain	England	Jack Clark	
102	October 2, 1999	Ireland	8	53	Lansdowne Road	Dublin, Ireland	30,000	1999 Rugby World Cup	Ireland	Jack Clark	
103	October 9, 1999	Romania	25	27	Lansdowne Road	Dublin, Ireland	3,000	1999 Rugby World Cup	Romania	Jack Clark	
104	October 14, 1999	Australia	19	55	Thomond Park	Limerick, Ireland	13,000	1999 Rugby World Cup	Australia	Jack Clark	
105	May 27, 2000	Japan	36	21	Hanazono Rugby Stadium	Higashiōsaka, Osaka	6,000	2000 Pacific Rim Rugby Championship	United States	Duncan Hall Jr.	
106	June 3, 2000	Canada	34	25	Singer Family Park	Manchester, New Hampshire		2000 Pacific Rim Rugby Championship	United States	Duncan Hall Jr.	
107	June 10, 2000	Ireland	3	83	Singer Family Park	Manchester, New Hampshire		Ireland tour of the Americas	Ireland	Duncan Hall Jr.	
108	June 30, 2000	Fiji	21	37	Apia Park	Apia, Samoa		2000 Pacific Rim Rugby Championship	Fiji	Duncan Hall Jr.	
109	July 8, 2000	Tonga	6	29	Teufaiva Stadium	Nukuʻalofa, Tonga		2000 Pacific Rim Rugby Championship	Tonga	Duncan Hall Jr.	
110	July 15, 2000	Samoa	12	19	Boxer Stadium	San Francisco, California		2000 Pacific Rim Rugby Championship	Samoa	Duncan Hall Jr.	
111	November 4, 2000	Scotland	6	53	Murrayfield Stadium	Edinburgh, Scotland	35,638	United States tour of Scotland and Wales	Scotland	Duncan Hall Jr.	
112	November 18, 2000	Wales	11	42	Millennium Stadium	Cardiff, Wales	33,000	United States tour of Scotland and Wales	Wales	Duncan Hall Jr.	
113	May 19, 2001	Canada	10	19	Richardson Stadium	Kingston, Ontario	7,155	PARA Pan American Championship	Canada	Duncan Hall Jr.	
114	May 23, 2001	Argentina	16	44	Mohawk Sports Park	Hamilton, Ontario		PARA Pan American Championship	Argentina	Duncan Hall Jr.	
115	May 26, 2001	Uruguay	31	28	Fletcher's Fields	Markham, Ontario	2,400	PARA Pan American Championship	United States	Duncan Hall Jr.	
116	June 16, 2001	England	19	48	Boxer Stadium	San Francisco, California	5,150	2001 England tour of North America	England	Duncan Hall Jr.	
117	December 1, 2001	South Africa	20	43	Robertson Stadium	Houston, Texas	13,000	2001 South Africa tour of Europe and North America	South Africa	Tom Billups	
118	June 22, 2002	Scotland	23	65	Boxer Stadium	San Francisco, California	2,400	2002 Scotland tour of North America	Scotland	Tom Billups	
119	June 29, 2002	Canada	9	26	Fletcher's Fields	Markham, Ontario	2,200	2003 Rugby World Cup Qualifier	Canada	Tom Billups	
120	July 13, 2002	Canada	13	36	Rockne Stadium	Chicago, Illinois	2,500	2003 Rugby World Cup Qualifier	Canada	Tom Billups	
121	August 10, 2002	Chile	35	22	Murray Rugby Field	Salt Lake City, Utah	2,075	2003 Rugby World Cup Qualifier	United States	Tom Billups	
122	August 15, 2002	Uruguay	28	24	Boxer Stadium	San Francisco, California	1,230	2003 Rugby World Cup Qualifier	United States	Tom Billups	
123	August 24, 2002	Chile	13	21	Prince of Wales Country Club	Santiago, Chile	2,800	2003 Rugby World Cup Qualifier	Chile	Tom Billups	
124	August 31, 2002	Uruguay	9	10	Estadio Saroldi	Montevideo, Uruguay	3,000	2003 Rugby World Cup Qualifier	Uruguay	Tom Billups	
125	April 12, 2003	Spain	62	13	Estadio Nacional Complutense	Madrid, Spain	2,500	2003 Rugby World Cup Repechage	United States	Tom Billups	
126	April 27, 2003	Spain	58	13	Lockhart Stadium	Fort Lauderdale, Florida	1,730	2003 Rugby World Cup Repechage	United States	Tom Billups	
127	May 17, 2003	Japan	69	27	Boxer Stadium	San Francisco, California	1,852	2003 Super Powers Cup	United States	Tom Billups	
128	June 18, 2003	Canada	16	11	Thunderbird Stadium	University Endowment Lands, British Columbia	3,200	2003 Churchill Cup	United States	Tom Billups	
129	June 21, 2003	England A	10	36	Thunderbird Stadium	University Endowment Lands, British Columbia		2003 Churchill Cup	England A	Tom Billups	
130	June 28, 2003	England A	6	43	Thunderbird Stadium	University Endowment Lands, British Columbia		2003 Churchill Cup Final	England A	Tom Billups	
131	August 23, 2003	Argentina	8	42	Buenos Aires Cricket & Rugby Club	San Fernando, Argentina	6,000	2003 PARA Pan American Championship	Argentina	Tom Billups	
132	August 27, 2003	Canada	35	20	Club Atlético San Isidro	San Isidro, Buenos Aires		2003 PARA Pan American Championship	United States	Tom Billups	
133	August 30, 2003	Uruguay	31	17	Buenos Aires Cricket & Rugby Club	San Fernando, Argentina		2003 PARA Pan American Championship	United States	Tom Billups	
134	October 15, 2003	Fiji	18	19	Suncorp Stadium	Milton, Queensland	30,990	2003 Rugby World Cup	Fiji	Tom Billups	
135	October 20, 2003	Scotland	15	39	Suncorp Stadium	Milton, Queensland	46,796	2003 Rugby World Cup	Scotland	Tom Billups	
136	October 27, 2003	Japan	39	26	Central Coast Stadium	Gosford, New South Wales	19,653	2003 Rugby World Cup	United States	Tom Billups	
137	October 31, 2003	France	14	41	Wollongong Showground	Wollongong, New South Wales	17,833	2003 Rugby World Cup	France	Tom Billups	
138	May 27, 2004	Canada	20	23	National Olympic Stadium	Shinjuku, Tokyo	3,500	2004 Super Powers Cup	Canada	Tom Billups	
139	May 30, 2004	Russia	41	11	Prince Chichibu Memorial Stadium	Minato, Tokyo		2004 Super Powers Cup	United States	Tom Billups	
140	June 19, 2004	Canada	29	32	Commonwealth Stadium	Edmonton, Alberta	5,000	2004 Churchill Cup	Canada	Tom Billups	
141	July 3, 2004	France	31	39	Dillon Stadium	Hartford, Connecticut	5,840	2004 France tour of North America	France	Tom Billups	
142	November 20, 2004	Ireland	6	55	Lansdowne Road	Dublin, Ireland	38,376	2004 United States tour of Ireland and Italy	Ireland	Tom Billups	
143	November 27, 2004	Italy	25	43	Stadio Lamarmora	Biella, Piedmont	8,000	2004 United States tour of Ireland and Italy	Italy	Tom Billups	
144	May 25, 2005	Canada	26	30	National Olympic Stadium	Tokyo, Japan	3,500	2005 Super Powers Cup	Canada	Tom Billups	
145	May 29, 2005	Romania	28	22	Chichibunomiya Rugby Stadium	Minato, Tokyo		2005 Super Powers Cup	United States	Tom Billups	
146	June 4, 2005	Wales	3	77	Rentschler Field	East Hartford, Connecticut	8,027	2005 Wales tour of North America	Wales	Tom Billups	
147	June 19, 2005	Argentina XV	30	34	Commonwealth Stadium	Edmonton, Alberta		2005 Churchill Cup	Argentina XV	Tom Billups	
148	June 26, 2005	Canada	20	19	Commonwealth Stadium	Edmonton, Alberta	15,000	2005 Churchill Cup	United States	Tom Billups	
149	June 3, 2006	Ireland Wolfhounds	13	28	Buck Shaw Stadium	Santa Clara, California	3,700	2006 Churchill Cup	Ireland Wolfhounds	Peter Thorburn	
150	June 8, 2006	(Māori people) Māori All Blacks	6	74	Buck Shaw Stadium	Santa Clara, California	3,562	2006 Churchill Cup	(Māori people) Māori All Blacks	Peter Thorburn	
151	June 17, 2006	Canada	18	33	Commonwealth Stadium	Edmonton, Alberta		2006 Churchill Cup	Canada	Peter Thorburn	
152	July 1, 2006	Barbados	91	0	Buck Shaw Stadium	Santa Clara, California		2007 World Cup Qualifier	United States	Peter Thorburn	
153	August 12, 2006	Canada	7	56	Swilers Rugby Park	St. John's, Newfoundland and Labrador	5,000	2007 World Cup Qualifier	Canada	Peter Thorburn	
154	October 1, 2006	Uruguay	42	13	Estadio Gran Parque Central	Montevideo, Uruguay	10,000	2007 World Cup Qualifier	United States	Peter Thorburn	
155	October 7, 2006	Uruguay	33	7	Steuber Rugby Stadium	Palo Alto, California		2007 World Cup Qualifier	United States	Peter Thorburn	
156	May 18, 2007	England A	3	51	Edgeley Park	Stockport, England	6,050	2007 Churchill Cup	England A	Peter Thorburn	
157	May 23, 2007	Scotland A	9	13	Dry Leas	Henley-on-Thames, England	1,103	2007 Churchill Cup	Scotland A	Peter Thorburn	
158	June 2, 2007	Canada	10	52	Twickenham Stadium	Twickenham, London		2007 Churchill Cup	Canada	Peter Thorburn	
159	September 8, 2007	England	10	28	Stade Bollaert-Delelis	Lens, Pas-de-Calais	36,755	2007 Rugby World Cup	England	Peter Thorburn	
160	September 12, 2007	Tonga	15	25	Stade de la Mosson	Montpellier, France	25,214	2007 Rugby World Cup	Tonga	Peter Thorburn	
161	September 26, 2007	Samoa	21	25	Stade Geoffroy-Guichard	Saint-Étienne, France	34,134	2007 Rugby World Cup	Samoa	Peter Thorburn	
162	September 30, 2007	South Africa	15	64	Stade de la Mosson	Montpellier, France	30,485	2007 Rugby World Cup	South Africa	Peter Thorburn	
163	June 7, 2008	England A	10	64	Lansdowne Stadium	Ottawa, Ontario		2008 Churchill Cup	England A	Scott Johnson	
164	June 11, 2008	Ireland Wolfhounds	9	46	Richardson Memorial Stadium	Kingston, Ontario		2008 Churchill Cup	Ireland Wolfhounds	Scott Johnson	
165	June 21, 2008	Canada	10	26	Toyota Park	Bridgeview, Illinois		2008 Churchill Cup	Canada	Scott Johnson	
166	November 8, 2008	Uruguay	43	9	Rio Tinto Stadium	Sandy, Utah	5,060	2008 end-of-year rugby union internationals	United States	Scott Johnson	
167	November 16, 2008	Japan	19	29	Paloma Mizuho Rugby Stadium	Nagoya, Japan	5,111	2008 United States tour of Japan	Japan	Scott Johnson	
168	November 22, 2008	Japan	17	32	Chichibunomiya Rugby Stadium	Minato, Tokyo	11,836	2008 United States tour of Japan	Japan	Scott Johnson	
169	May 31, 2009	Ireland	10	27	Buck Shaw Stadium	Santa Clara, California	10,000	2009 Ireland tour of North America	Ireland	Eddie O'Sullivan	
170	June 6, 2009	Wales	15	48	Toyota Park	Bridgeview, Illinois	6,264	2009 Wales tour of North America	Wales	Eddie O'Sullivan	
171	June 21, 2009	Georgia	31	13	Dick's Sporting Goods Park	Commerce City, Colorado	5,225	2009 Churchill Cup	United States	Eddie O'Sullivan	
172	July 4, 2009	Canada	12	6	Blackbaud Stadium	Charleston, South Carolina	3,836	2011 Rugby World Cup Qualifiers	United States	Eddie O'Sullivan	
173	July 11, 2009	Canada	18	41	Ellerslie Rugby Park	Edmonton, Alberta		2011 Rugby World Cup Qualifiers	Canada	Eddie O'Sullivan	
174	November 14, 2009	Uruguay	27	22	Estadio Charrúa	Montevideo, Uruguay	2,000	2011 Rugby World Cup Qualifiers	United States	Eddie O'Sullivan	
175	November 21, 2009	Uruguay	27	6	Central Broward Park	Lauderhill, Florida	2,237	2011 Rugby World Cup Qualifiers	United States	Eddie O'Sullivan	
176	June 5, 2010	Russia	39	22	Infinity Park	Glendale, Colorado		2010 Churchill Cup	United States	Eddie O'Sullivan	
177	November 13, 2010	Portugal	22	17	Lisbon University Stadium	Lisbon, Portugal		United States tour of Europe	United States	Eddie O'Sullivan	
178	November 27, 2010	Georgia	17	19	Boris Paichadze Dinamo Arena	Tbilisi, Georgia	35,000	United States tour of Europe	Georgia	Eddie O'Sullivan	
179	June 8, 2011	Tonga	13	44	Molesey Road	Hersham, Surrey		2011 Churchill Cup	Tonga	Eddie O'Sullivan	
180	June 18, 2011	Russia	32	25	Sixways Stadium	Worcester, England		2011 Churchill Cup	United States	Eddie O'Sullivan	
181	August 6, 2011	Canada	22	28	BMO Field	Toronto, Ontario		2011 Rugby World Cup warm-up matches	Canada	Eddie O'Sullivan	
182	August 13, 2011	Canada	7	27	Infinity Park	Glendale, Colorado	5,000	2011 Rugby World Cup warm-up matches	Canada	Eddie O'Sullivan	
183	August 21, 2011	Japan	14	20	Chichibunomiya Rugby Stadium	Minato, Tokyo	12,519	2011 Rugby World Cup warm-up matches	Japan	Eddie O'Sullivan	
184	September 11, 2011	Ireland	10	22	Yarrow Stadium	New Plymouth, New Zealand	20,823	2011 Rugby World Cup	Ireland	Eddie O'Sullivan	
185	September 15, 2011	Russia	13	6	Yarrow Stadium	New Plymouth, New Zealand	20,800	2011 Rugby World Cup	United States	Eddie O'Sullivan	
186	September 23, 2011	Australia	5	67	Wellington Regional Stadium	Wellington, New Zealand	33,824	2011 Rugby World Cup	Australia	Eddie O'Sullivan	
187	September 27, 2011	Italy	10	27	Trafalgar Park	Nelson, New Zealand	14,997	2011 Rugby World Cup	Italy	Eddie O'Sullivan	
188	June 9, 2012	Canada	25	28	Richardson Memorial Stadium	Kingston, Ontario	7,521	2012 June rugby union tests	Canada	Mike Tolkin	
189	June 17, 2012	Georgia	36	20	Infinity Park	Glendale, Colorado	3,800	2012 June rugby union tests	United States	Mike Tolkin	
190	June 23, 2012	Italy	10	30	BBVA Compass Stadium	Houston, Texas	17,214	2012 June rugby union tests	Italy	Mike Tolkin	
191	November 9, 2012	Russia	40	26	Eirias Stadium	Colwyn Bay, Wales		2012 International Rugby Series	United States	Mike Tolkin	
192	November 17, 2012	Tonga	13	22	Eirias Stadium	Colwyn Bay, Wales		2012 International Rugby Series	Tonga	Mike Tolkin	
193	November 24, 2012	Romania	34	3	Stadionul Arcul de Triumf	Bucharest, Romania		2012 November rugby union tests	United States	Mike Tolkin	
194	May 25, 2013	Canada	9	16	Ellerslie Rugby Park	Edmonton, Alberta	3,526	2013 IRB Pacific Nations Cup	Canada	Mike Tolkin	
195	June 9, 2013	Ireland	12	15	BBVA Compass Stadium	Houston, Texas	20,181	2013 Ireland tour	Ireland	Mike Tolkin	
196	June 14, 2013	Tonga	9	18	StubHub Center	Carson, California	6,000	2013 IRB Pacific Nations Cup	Tonga	Mike Tolkin	
197	June 19, 2013	Fiji	10	35	Mizuho Rugby Stadium	Nagoya, Japan	3,459	2013 IRB Pacific Nations Cup	Fiji	Mike Tolkin	
198	June 23, 2013	Japan	20	38	Chichibunomiya Rugby Stadium	Minato, Tokyo	9,467	2013 IRB Pacific Nations Cup	Japan	Mike Tolkin	
199	August 17, 2013	Canada	9	27	Blackbaud Stadium	Charleston, South Carolina	5,258	2015 Rugby World Cup Qualifiers	Canada	Mike Tolkin	
200	August 24, 2013	Canada	11	13	BMO Field	Toronto, Ontario	10,207	2015 Rugby World Cup Qualifiers	Canada	Mike Tolkin	
201	November 16, 2013	Georgia	25	23	Rustavi Stadium	Rustavi, Georgia	6,509	2013 November rugby union tests	United States	Mike Tolkin	
202	November 23, 2013	Russia	28	7	Barnet Copthall	London, England	6,509	2013 November rugby union tests	United States	Mike Tolkin	
203	March 22, 2014	Uruguay	27	27	Estadio Charrúa	Montevideo, Uruguay		2015 Rugby World Cup Qualifier	Draw	Mike Tolkin	
204	March 29, 2014	Uruguay	32	13	Fifth Third Bank Stadium	Kennesaw, Georgia	6,300	2015 Rugby World Cup Qualifier	United States	Mike Tolkin	
205	June 7, 2014	Scotland	6	24	BBVA Compass Stadium	Houston, Texas	20,001	2014 Scotland tour of the Americas and South Africa	Scotland	Mike Tolkin	
206	June 14, 2014	Japan	29	37	StubHub Center	Carson, California	5,100	2014 IRB Pacific Nations Cup	Japan	Mike Tolkin	
207	June 21, 2014	Canada	38	35	Bonney Field	Sacramento, California	7,804	2014 IRB Pacific Nations Cup	United States	Mike Tolkin	
208	November 1, 2014	New Zealand	6	74	Soldier Field	Chicago, Illinois	61,500	2014 November rugby union tests	New Zealand	Mike Tolkin	
209	November 8, 2014	Romania	27	17	Stadionul Arcul de Triumf	Bucharest, Romania		2014 November rugby union tests	United States	Mike Tolkin	
210	November 15, 2014	Tonga	12	40	Kingsholm Stadium	Gloucester, England	8,949	2014 November rugby union tests	Tonga	Mike Tolkin	
211	November 21, 2014	Fiji	14	20	Stade de la Rabine	Vannes, France		2014 November rugby union tests	Fiji	Mike Tolkin	
212	July 18, 2015	Samoa	16	21	Avaya Stadium	San Jose, California	10,017	2015 Pacific Nations Cup	Samoa	Mike Tolkin	
213	July 24, 2015	Japan	23	18	Bonney Field	Sacramento, California		2015 Pacific Nations Cup	United States	Mike Tolkin	
214	July 29, 2015	Tonga	19	33	BMO Field	Toronto, Ontario	9,600	2015 Pacific Nations Cup	Tonga	Mike Tolkin	
215	August 3, 2015	Canada	15	13	Swangard Stadium	Burnaby, British Columbia		2015 Pacific Nations Cup	United States	Mike Tolkin	
216	August 22, 2015	Canada	41	23	Twin Elm Rugby Park	Ottawa, Ontario	5,168	2015 Rugby World Cup warm-up	United States	Mike Tolkin	
217	September 5, 2015	Australia	10	47	Soldier Field	Chicago, Illinois	23,212	2015 Rugby World Cup warm-up	Australia	Mike Tolkin	
218	September 20, 2015	Samoa	16	25	Brighton Community Stadium	Brighton, England	29,178	2015 Rugby World Cup	Samoa	Mike Tolkin	
219	September 27, 2015	Scotland	16	39	Elland Road	Leeds, England	33,521	2015 Rugby World Cup	Scotland	Mike Tolkin	
220	October 7, 2015	South Africa	0	64	Olympic Stadium	London, England	54,658	2015 Rugby World Cup	South Africa	Mike Tolkin	
221	October 11, 2015	Japan	18	28	Kingsholm Stadium	Gloucester, England	14,517	2015 Rugby World Cup	Japan	Mike Tolkin	
222	February 13, 2016	Canada	30	22	Dell Diamond	Round Rock, Texas	7,145	2016 Americas Rugby Championship	United States	John Mitchell	
223	February 20, 2016	Chile	64	0	Lockhart Stadium	Fort Lauderdale, Florida	7,145	2016 Americas Rugby Championship	United States	John Mitchell	
224	February 27, 2016	Brazil	23	24	Arena Barueri	Barueri, Brazil	3,798	2016 Americas Rugby Championship	Brazil	John Mitchell	
225	March 5, 2016	Uruguay	25	29	Estadio Charrúa	Montevideo, Uruguay	3,000	2016 Americas Rugby Championship	Uruguay	John Mitchell	
226	June 18, 2016	Italy	20	24	Avaya Stadium	San Jose, California		2016 June rugby union tests	Italy	John Mitchell	
227	June 25, 2016	Russia	25	0	Bonney Field	Sacramento, California		2016 June rugby union tests	United States	John Mitchell	
228	November 12, 2016	Romania	10	23	Stadionul Arcul de Triumf	Bucharest, Romania	5,000	2016 end-of-year rugby union internationals	Romania	John Mitchell	
229	November 19, 2016	Tonga	17	20	Anoeta Stadium	San Sebastián, Spain	12,500	2016 end-of-year rugby union internationals	Tonga	John Mitchell	
230	February 4, 2017	Uruguay	29	23	Toyota Field	San Antonio, Texas	3,000	2017 Americas Rugby Championship	United States	John Mitchell	
231	February 11, 2017	Brazil	51	3	Dell Diamond	Round Rock, Texas	6,091	2017 Americas Rugby Championship	United States	John Mitchell	
232	February 18, 2017	Canada	51	34	Swangard Stadium	Burnaby, British Columbia	3,416	2017 Americas Rugby Championship	United States	John Mitchell	
233	February 25, 2017	Chile	57	9	Pista Atlética San Carlos de Apoquindo	Santiago, Chile	900	2017 Americas Rugby Championship	United States	John Mitchell	
234	June 10, 2017	Ireland	19	55	Red Bull Arena	Harrison, New Jersey	22,370	2017 June rugby union tests	Ireland	John Mitchell	
235	June 17, 2017	Georgia	17	21	Fifth Third Bank Stadium	Kennesaw, Georgia		2017 June rugby union tests	Georgia	John Mitchell	
236	June 24, 2017	Canada	28	28	Tim Hortons Field	Hamilton, Ontario	13,187	2019 Rugby World Cup – Americas qualification	Draw	John Mitchell	
237	July 1, 2017	Canada	52	16	Torero Stadium	San Diego, California	5,000	2019 Rugby World Cup – Americas qualification	United States	John Mitchell	
238	November 18, 2017	Germany	46	17	BRITA-Arena	Wiesbaden, Germany	3,150	2017 end-of-year rugby union internationals	United States	Dave Hewett	
239	November 25, 2017	Georgia	20	21	Mikheil Meskhi Stadium	Tbilisi, Georgia	20,000	2017 end-of-year rugby union internationals	Georgia	Dave Hewett	
240	February 10, 2018	Canada	29	10	Papa Murphy's Park	Sacramento, California	2,500	2018 Americas Rugby Championship	United States	Gary Gold	
241	February 17, 2018	Chile	45	13	Titan Stadium	Fullerton, California	2,000	2018 Americas Rugby Championship	United States	Gary Gold	
242	February 24, 2018	Brazil	45	16	Estádio Martins Pereira	São José dos Campos, Brazil	1,061	2018 Americas Rugby Championship	United States	Gary Gold	
243	March 3, 2018	Uruguay	61	19	Estadio Charrúa	Montevideo, uruguay	2,500	2018 Americas Rugby Championship	United States	Gary Gold	
244	June 9, 2018	Russia	62	13	Dick's Sporting Goods Park	Commerce City, Colorado		2018 June rugby union tests	United States	Gary Gold	
245	June 16, 2018	Scotland	30	29	BBVA Compass Stadium	Houston, Texas		2018 June rugby union tests	United States	Gary Gold	
246	June 23, 2018	Canada	42	17	Wanderers Grounds	Halifax, Nova Scotia	6,213	2018 June rugby union tests	United States	Gary Gold	
247	November 10, 2018	Samoa	30	29	Anoeta Stadium	San Sebastián, Spain		2018 end-of-year rugby union internationals	United States	Gary Gold	
248	November 17, 2018	Romania	31	5	Ghencea Sports Complex	Bucharest, Romania		2018 end-of-year rugby union internationals	United States	Gary Gold	
249	November 24, 2018	Ireland	14	57	Aviva Stadium	Dublin, Ireland	51,000	2018 end-of-year rugby union internationals	Ireland	Gary Gold	
250	February 2, 2019	Chile	71	8	Estadio Santiago Bueras	Maipu, Chile		2019 Americas Rugby Championship	United States	Gary Gold	
251	February 23, 2019	Brazil	33	28	Dell Diamond	Round Rock, Texas		2019 Americas Rugby Championship	United States	Gary Gold	
252	March 2, 2019	Uruguay	25	32	Starfire Sports	Tukwila, Washington		2019 Americas Rugby Championship	Uruguay	Gary Gold	
253	March 8, 2019	Canada	30	25	Starfire Sports	Tukwila, Washington		2019 Americas Rugby Championship	United States	Gary Gold	
254	July 27, 2019	Canada	47	19	Infinity Park	Glendale, Colorado	5,000	2019 Pacific Nations Cup	United States	Gary Gold	
255	August 3, 2019	Samoa	13	10	ANZ National Stadium	Suva, Fiji		2019 Pacific Nations Cup	United States	Gary Gold	
256	August 10, 2019	Japan	20	34	ANZ National Stadium	Suva, Fiji		2019 Pacific Nations Cup	Japan	Gary Gold	
257	September 7, 2019	Canada	20	15	BC Place	Vancouver, British Columbia		2019 Rugby World Cup warm-up	United States	Gary Gold	
258	September 26, 2019	England	7	45	Kobe Misaki Stadium	Kobe, Japan	27,194	2019 Rugby World Cup	England	Gary Gold	
259	October 2, 2019	France	9	33	Fukuoka Hakatanomori Stadium	Fukuoka, Japan	17,660	2019 Rugby World Cup	France	Gary Gold	
260	October 9, 2019	Argentina	17	47	Kumagaya Rugby Stadium	Kumagaya, Japan	24,377	2019 Rugby World Cup	Argentina	Gary Gold	
261	October 13, 2019	Tonga	19	31	Hanazono Rugby Stadium	Higashiōsaka, Japan	22,012	2019 Rugby World Cup	Tonga	Gary Gold	
262	July 4, 2021	England	29	43	Twickenham Stadium	Twickenham, London	10,000	2021 July rugby union tests	England	Gary Gold	
263	July 10, 2021	Ireland	10	71	Aviva Stadium	Dublin, Ireland	6,000	2021 July rugby union tests	Ireland	Gary Gold	
264	September 4, 2021	Canada	21	34	Swiler's Rugby Park	St. John's, Newfoundland		2023 Rugby World Cup Qualifier	Canada	Gary Gold	
265	September 11, 2021	Canada	38	16	Infinity Park	Glendale, Colorado		2023 Rugby World Cup Qualifier	United States	Gary Gold	
266	October 2, 2021	Uruguay	19	16	Infinity Park	Glendale, Colorado		2023 Rugby World Cup Qualifier	United States	Gary Gold	
267	October 9, 2021	Uruguay	15	34	Estadio Charrúa	Montevideo		2023 Rugby World Cup Qualifier	Uruguay	Gary Gold	
268	October 23, 2021	New Zealand	14	104	FedExField	Washington D.C., United States	39,720	2021 end-of-year rugby union internationals	New Zealand	Gary Gold	
269	July 9, 2022	Chile	22	21	Estadio Santa Laura-Universidad SEK	Santiago, Chile	12,500	2023 Rugby World Cup Qualifier	United States	Gary Gold	
270	July 16, 2022	Chile	29	31	Infinity Park	Glendale, Colorado	5,000	2023 Rugby World Cup Qualifier	Chile	Gary Gold	
271	November 6, 2022	Kenya	68	14	The Sevens Stadium	Dubai, United Arab Emirates		2023 Rugby World Cup Qualifier	United States	Gary Gold	
272	November 12, 2022	Hong Kong	49	7	The Sevens Stadium	Dubai, United Arab Emirates		2023 Rugby World Cup Qualifier	United States	Gary Gold	
273	November 18, 2022	Portugal	16	16	The Sevens Stadium	Dubai, United Arab Emirates		2023 Rugby World Cup Qualifier	Draw	Gary Gold	
274	August 5, 2023	Romania	31	17	Stadionul Arcul de Triumf	Bucharest, Romania		2023 Rugby World Cup warm-up	United States	Scott Lawrence	
275	August 12, 2023	Portugal	20	46	Estádio Algarve	São João da Venda, Portugal		2023 Rugby World Cup warm-up	Portugal	Scott Lawrence	
276	August 19, 2023	Georgia	7	22	Mikheil Meskhi Stadium	Tbilisi, Georgia	15,000	2023 Rugby World Cup warm-up	Georgia	Scott Lawrence	
277	November 11, 2023	Brazil	48	3	El Pantano Stadium	Alicante, Spain		La Vila International Rugby Cup	United States	Scott Lawrence	
278	November 18, 2023	Spain	42	12	El Pantano Stadium	Alicante, Spain		La Vila International Rugby Cup	United States	Scott Lawrence	
279	July 5, 2024	Romania	20	22	SeatGeek Stadium	Bridgeview, Illinois	2,000	2024 mid-year rugby union tests	Romania	Scott Lawrence	
280	July 12, 2024	Scotland	7	42	Audi Field	Washington, D.C., United States	17,418	2024 mid-year rugby union tests	Scotland	Scott Lawrence	
281	August 31, 2024	Canada	28	15	Dignity Health Sports Park	Carson, California		2024 mid-year rugby union tests	United States	Scott Lawrence	
282	September 7, 2024	Japan	24	41	Kumagaya Rugby Ground	Kumagaya, Japan		2024 Pacific Nations Cup	Japan	Scott Lawrence	
283	September 14, 2024	Fiji	3	22	Chichibunomiya Rugby Stadium	Minato, Tokyo		2024 Pacific Nations Cup	Fiji	Scott Lawrence	
284	September 21, 2024	Samoa	13	18	Hanazono Rugby Stadium	Higashiōsaka, Japan		2024 Pacific Nations Cup	Samoa	Scott Lawrence	
285	November 9, 2024	Portugal	21	17	Estádio Cidade de Coimbra	Coimbra, Portugal		2024 end-of-year internationals	United States	Scott Lawrence	
286	November 16, 2024	Tonga	36	17	Chambéry Savoie Stadium	Chambéry, France		2024 end-of-year internationals	United States	Scott Lawrence	
287	November 23, 2024	Spain	26	23	Estadio Nacional Complutense	Madrid, Spain		2024 end-of-year internationals	United States	Scott Lawrence	
288	July 5, 2025	Belgium	36	17	American Legion Memorial Stadium	Charlotte, North Carolina		2025 mid-year rugby union tests	United States	Scott Lawrence	
289	July 12, 2025	Spain	20	31	American Legion Memorial Stadium	Charlotte, North Carolina	6,129	2025 mid-year rugby union tests	Spain	Scott Lawrence	
290	July 19, 2025	England	5	40	Audi Field	Washington D.C.	19,079	2025 mid-year rugby union tests	England	Scott Lawrence	
291	August 22, 2025	Canada	20	34	McMahon Stadium	Calgary	11,587	2025 Pacific Nations Cup	Canada	Scott Lawrence	
292	August 22, 2025	Japan	21	47	Heart Health Park	Sacramento	6,079	2025 Pacific Nations Cup	Japan	Scott Lawrence	
293	September 14, 2025	Samoa	29	13	Dick's Sporting Goods Park	Commerce City, Colorado	est. 6,452	2025 Pacific Nations Cup	United States	Scott Lawrence	
294	November 1, 2025	Scotland	0	85	Murrayfield Stadium	Edinburgh	56,589	2025 November tests	Scotland	Scott Lawrence	
295	November 8, 2025	Georgia	30	43	Adjarabet Arena	Batumi		2025 November tests	Georgia	Scott Lawrence	
296	November 15, 2025	Romania	26	18	Arcul de Triumf Stadium	Bucharest		2025 November tests	United States	Scott Lawrence	
297	July 4, 2026	Portugal	30	29	Dick's Sporting Goods Park	Commerce City, Colorado	est. 10,500	2026 Nations Cup	United States	Scott Lawrence	
298	July 11, 2026	Zimbabwe	31	15	American Legion Memorial Stadium	Charlotte, North Carolina	est. 3,000	2026 Nations Cup	United States	Scott Lawrence	
299	July 18, 2026	Spain	29	22	WakeMed Soccer Park	Cary, North Carolina	7,397	2026 Nations Cup	United States	Scott Lawrence	
300	September 12, 2026	Japan	14	63	Hanazono Rugby Stadium	Higashiosaka, Japan	13,559	2026 Pacific Nations Cup	Japan	Scott Lawrence	
301	September 19, 2026	Canada	16	19	Chichibunomiya Rugby Stadium	Tokyo, Japan		2026 Pacific Nations Cup	Canada	Scott Lawrence	
302	November 8, 2026	Hong Kong	28	26	Stade Marcel-Verchère	Bourg-en-Bresse, France	2,700	2026 Nations Cup	United States	Scott Lawrence	
303	November 14, 2026	Romania	53	24	Arcul de Triumf Stadium	Bucharest, Romania		2026 Nations Cup	United States	Scott Lawrence	

== List of non-test matches ==
Below is a list of USA Eagles matches in which test caps were not awarded.

No.	Date	Opponent	F	A	Venue	City	Attendance	Competition	Winner	Head coach	Ref.
1	April 1924	(England) Harlequins	11	21	Twickenham Stadium	Twickenham, England		1924 United States tour of England and France	(England) Harlequins	Charlie Austin	
2	August 17, 1999	England A	9	57		Northampton, England		1999 United States tour of Australia and Great Britain	England A	Jack Clark	
3	August 28, 1999	Wales XV	9	57	Millennium Stadium	Cardiff, Wales		1999 United States tour of Australia and Great Britain	Wales XV	Jack Clark	
4	November 8, 2000	Scotland Developmental XV	17	49		Aberdeen, Scotland		2000 United States tour of Scotland and Wales	Scotland Developmental XV	Duncan Hall Jr.	
5	November 14, 2000	Wales Developmental XV	11	42	The Gnoll	Neath, Wales		2000 United States tour of Scotland and Wales	Wales Developmental XV	Duncan Hall Jr.	
6	June 12, 2004	(Māori people) Māori All Blacks	31	69	Kingsland Rugby Park	Calgary, Alberta	4,500	2004 Churchill Cup	(Māori people) Māori All Blacks	Tom Billups	
7	August 25, 2007	Munster	10	26	Toyota Park	Bridgeview, Illinois	8,260	2007 Rugby World Cup warm-up	Munster	Peter Thorburn	
8	June 10, 2009	Argentina XV	14	35	Infinity Park	Glendale, Colorado	1,800	2009 Churchill Cup	Argentina XV	Eddie O'Sullivan	
9	June 14, 2009	England A	17	56	Infinity Park	Glendale, Colorado		2009 Churchill Cup	England A	Eddie O'Sullivan	
10	June 13, 2010	England A	9	32	Infinity Park	Glendale, Colorado		2010 Churchill Cup	England A	Eddie O'Sullivan	
11	June 19, 2010	France A	10	24	Red Bull Arena	Harrison, New Jersey		2010 Churchill Cup	France A	Eddie O'Sullivan	
12	June 4, 2011	England A	8	87	Franklin's Gardens	Northampton, England		2011 Churchill Cup	England A	Eddie O'Sullivan	
13	November 9, 2013	(Māori people) Māori All Blacks	19	29	PPL Park	Chester, Pennsylvania	18,500	2013 Māori All Blacks tour of North America	(Māori people) Māori All Blacks	Mike Tolkin	
14	August 30, 2015	(England) Harlequins F.C.	19	24	PPL Park	Chester, Pennsylvania		2015 Rugby World Cup warm-up	(England) Harlequins F.C.	Mike Tolkin	
15	February 6, 2016	Argentina XV	35	35	BBVA Compass Stadium	Houston, Texas	10,241	2016 Americas Rugby Championship	Draw	John Mitchell	
16	March 4, 2017	Argentina XV	27	27	Estadio Municipal de Comodoro Rivadavia	Comodoro Rivadavia, Argentina	900	2017 Americas Rugby Championship	Draw	John Mitchell	
17	February 3, 2018	Argentina XV	17	10	StubHub Center	Carson, California	6,500	2018 Americas Rugby Championship	United States	Gary Gold	
18	November 3, 2018	(Māori people) Maori All Blacks	22	59	Soldier Field	Chicago, Illinois	35,051	2018 end-of-year rugby union internationals	(Māori people) Maori All Blacks	Gary Gold	
19	February 9, 2019	Argentina XV	14	45	Marabunta Rugby Club	Cipolletti, Río Negro Province		2019 Americas Rugby Championship	Argentina XV	Gary Gold	
20	July 1, 2022	(France) French Barbarians	26	21	Aveva Stadium	Houston, Texas		2022 mid-year tests	United States	Gary Gold	
21	September 17, 2023	(France) Stade Toulousain	24	21	America First Field	Sandy, Utah		Friendly	United States	Scott Lawrence	
22	August 15, 2026	Argentina XV	25	24	Inter Miami CF Stadium	Fort Lauderdale, Florida		Friendly	United States	Scott Lawrence	
23	October 24, 2026	Australia A	12	61	Geodis Park	Nashville, Tennessee	8,186	Friendly	Australia A	Scott Lawrence	
24	October 30, 2026	Australia A	0	52	Sports Illustrated Stadium	Harrison, New Jersey		Friendly	Australia A	Scott Lawrence	

== See also ==
- United States men's national rugby union team
- United States national rugby union team player statistics
- List of United States national rugby union players
- United States at the Rugby World Cup

== Sources ==
- "UNITED STATES TEST RUGBY RESULTS". Rugby International.
