= 1998 United States rugby union tour of Fiji =

- Manager: Jack Clark
Summary
P	W	D	L
Total
2	0	0	2
Test match
1	0	0	1
Opponent
P	W	D	L
Fiji
1	0	0	1

Tour chronology
- ← Wales 1997 Australia and Great Britain 1999 →

The 1998 United States rugby union tour of Fiji was a two match tour played in July 1998 in Fiji by the United States national rugby union team.

== Background ==
This tour marked the first meeting between the international teams of Fiji and the United States.

== Matches ==
Scores and results list United States's points tally first.

Opposing Team	For	Against	Date	Venue	Match
Fiji Warriors	10	72	July 21, 1998		Tour match
Fiji	9	18	July 25, 1998	National Stadium, Suva, Fiji	Test match

== Test Match ==
25 July 1998

Fiji	18–9	United States
	Report

National Stadium, Suva, Fiji
Attendance: 6,000
