= 2001 Tonga rugby union tour of Great Britain =

Summary
P	W	D	L
Total
4	0	0	4
Test match
2	0	0	2
Opponent
P	W	D	L
Scotland
1	0	0	1
Wales
1	0	0	1

The 2001 Tonga rugby union tour of Great Britain was a series of matches played in November 2001 in Scotland and Wales by Tonga national rugby union team.

6 November 2001

Scotland Devel. XV	40–20	Tonga XV

10 November 2001

Scotland	43–20	Tonga

Murrayfield, Edinburgh

13 November 2001

Wales A	26–23	Tonga XV

Stradey Park, Llanelli

17 November 2001

Wales	51–7	Tonga

Millennium, Cardiff
