= 1990 United States rugby union tour of Japan =

- Manager: Jim Perkins
Summary
P	W	D	L
Total
3	2	0	1
Test match
1	1	0	0
Opponent
P	W	D	L
Japan
1	1	0	0

Tour chronology
- ← Australia 1990 United States 1994 →

The 1990 United States rugby union tour of Japan was a series of matches played in September 1990 in Japan by United States national rugby union team.

== Matches ==
Scores and results list United States's points tally first.

Opposing Team	For	Against	Date	Venue	Match
Japan A	53	34	September 15, 1990		Tour Match
Japan Universities	0	16	September 19, 1990		Tour match
Japan	25	15	September 23, 1990	Chichibunomiya Rugby Stadium, Minato, Tokyo	Test match

== Test Match ==
23 September 1990

Japan	15–25	United States
Try: Goda; Kutsuki; Con: Hosokawa (2/2); Pen: Hosokawa (1)	Report	Try: Sawicki; Burke; Flay; Con: O'Brien (2/3); Pen: O'Brien (3)

Chichibunomiya Rugby Stadium, Minato, Tokyo
Attendance: 19,000
Referee: Barry J. Leask (Ausgtralia)
