= 1983 United States rugby union tour of Australia =

- Manager: Ron Mayes
Summary
P	W	D	L
Total
7	4	0	3
Test match
1	0	0	1
Opponent
P	W	D	L
Australia
1	0	0	1

Tour chronology
- ← England 1977 Japan 1985 →

The 1983 United States rugby union tour of Australia was a series of seven matches played by the United States national rugby union team in Australia in June and July 1983. The United States team won four of their seven matches and lost three, including the international match against the Australia national rugby union team.

== Background ==
This tour marked the third meeting between the international teams of USA and Australia. David Campese scored four tries in the lone test match, a single match record for an Australian player at the time.

== Matches ==
Scores and results list United States's points tally first.

Opposing Team	For	Against	Date	Venue	Match
Western Australia	25	18	June 19, 1983		Tour match
South Australia	34	15	June 22, 1983		Tour match
Victoria	13	8	June 25, 1983		Tour match
Sydney University Football Club	9	13	June 29, 1983	Sydney Cricket Ground, Sydney	Tour match
Queensland XV	10	14	July 3, 1983	Ballymore Stadium, Herston, Queensland	Tour match
New South Wales Country	26	3	July 6, 1983		Tour match
Australia	3	49	July 9, 1983	Sydney Cricket Ground, Moore Park, New South Wales	Test Match

== Test Match ==
9 July 1983

Australia	49–3	United States
Try: Slack (2); Ross; Roche; Hanley; Campese (4); Con: Gould (4); Drop: Ella (1)	Report	Pen: Meyersieck (1)

Sydney Cricket Ground, Moore Park, New South Wales
Attendance: 21,737
