= Ray Cornbill =

American rugby union coach

- Born: Ray Cornbill; 1937 (age 88–89) Birmingham, England
- University: University of Toronto
- Occupation(s): Rugby union coach and player

Rugby union career
- Position: Flanker
Senior career
Years	Team	Apps	(Points)
1956–1962	Toronto Barbarians		
1962–1965	Montreal Barbarians		
1965–1971	Manhattan Rugby Football Club		
Coaching career
- Years: Team
- 1970: Manhattan Rugby Football Club
- 1971: Eastern Rugby Union
- 1978: American Cougars
- 1976–1983: United States
- 1988–1990: Old Blue R.F.C.
- 2012: Columbia University

Ray Cornbill is an English-born American former rugby union coach, best known for coaching the United States national rugby union team and the American Cougars.

== Early life ==
Cornbill was born in 1937 in Birmingham, England. He began playing rugby career at age 11, at the famous “Public School,” King Edwards School. At 13, Cornbill's family moved to Toronto, Canada. At 16 Cornbill joined the Toronto Barbarians men's team. Cornbill enrolled at the University of Toronto and played for the university rugby team.

== Career ==
Cornbill played for the Montreal Barbarians between 1962-1965 and captained the team in 1964.

Cornbill moved to New York in 1965 and soon became a player/coach for the Manhattan Rugby Football Club. He captained the team between 1967 and 1969. In 1970 he became head coach of the Manhattan RFC and 1971 became the head coach of the Eastern Rugby Union representative side.

In 1976 Cornbill joined the United States National Team program in 1976. He was on a panel of four national team selectors from 1976 to 1983. He shared head coach duties of the United States national rugby union team with Dennis Storer. In 1978, Cornbill became the head coach of the American Cougars side that toured South Africa and Rhodesia. He left the USA set up in 1983, but returned in 2000 as assistant coach.

Cornbill was an assistant coach for New York Old Blue in 1986, and served as their head coach from 1988 to 1990.

== Awards ==
In 2012 the University of Toronto created the Ray Cornbill Award, awarded to the player who contributes the most to the club, both on and off the field. Cornbill was inducted into the U.S. Rugby Hall of Fame in 2013 and into the Maccabi USA Rugby Hall of Fame in 2018.
