= Duncan Hall Jr. =

Australian international rugby union player (born 1956)

- Born: Duncan Hall; 16 March 1956 (age 70) Brisbane, Australia
- Height: 1.85 m (6 ft 1 in)
- Weight: 98.5 kg (217 lb; 15 st 7 lb)
- Notable relative: Duncan Hall (father)

Rugby union career
- Position: No. 8, Lock
Senior career
Years	Team	Apps	(Points)
1975-1983	University of Queensland	75	
International career
Years	Team	Apps	(Points)
1979-1983	Australia	15	(4)
Coaching career
- Years: Team
- 1987-1988: Gordon RFC
- 1989-1993: Tuggeranong Vikings
- 1994-1996: Queensland Reds
- 1996-1998: Leicester Tigers
- 1998-1999: Worcester Warriors
- 2000-2002: United States
- 2001-2002: New South Wales Waratahs
- 2009-2011: Indonesia
- 2012-2013: United Arab Emirates

Duncan Hall (Note: Duncan Hall is his official name according to his Birth Certificate. Michael was his confirmation name adopted at Nudgee College. Acquired information from Duncan himself. October 2021) (born 16 March 1956) is an Australian former rugby union footballer who played for the Australian national rugby team, earning fifteen caps for the Wallabies. His primary positions were Number 8 and 2nd Row. His post rugby resume includes an impressive list of coaching positions ranging from Super 12 to international teams. Hall's father, Duncan Hall Sr., was a professional rugby league footballer for Australia, and is considered one of the greatest players of the 20th Century.

== Playing career ==
Hall was a standout athlete at St Joseph's College, Nudgee and made his senior rugby debut with the University of Queensland Rugby Club in 1975, at the age of 19. Between 1975 and 1983, Hall would play in 75 games for Queensland.

In 1979, Hall's reputation playing for Queensland earned him a reserve spot on the Wallabies for Test matches against Ireland and New Zealand, and later a spot on the Wallaby team to tour Argentina.

He made his international debut for Australia as the starting Number 8 in a 22–9 win over Fiji in Suva on 24 May 1980. In 1982, Hall was named vice captain of the Wallaby squad to tour New Zealand and would go on to captain Australia twice more.

Between 1979 and 1983, Hall would play in a total of 39 matches for Australia, including 15 Test matches, and six Bledisloe Cups.

His final Test match was Australia's 29–7 win over Italy on 22 October 1983. Hall opted to remain in Italy after being dropped from the roster that would play France. After a brief time playing club rugby there, Hall returned to Australia to pursue a career in coaching.

== Coaching career ==
Hall's coaching career began with the Queensland Reds before moving to the UK to take a position with the Leicester Tigers in 1996 as an assistant/forwards coach. After one season with the Tigers, Hall worked his way up the ladder and became the head coach at the Worcester Warriors.

In February 2000, Hall was named the head coach of the USA Rugby team, taking over for Jack Clark who stepped down after the 1999 Rugby World Cup. Hall left the Eagles with a record of three wins and nine losses. He returned home to Australia and became an assistant coach with the NSW Waratahs until 2002.

In 2009, took a forwards coaching position with the Indonesia prior to the start of the Division 3 Asian Five Nations tournament in the Philippines. Hall continued on as head coach for the Rhinos in 2010 and 2011.

Hall took a position as head coach for the United Arab Emirates in January 2012, taking over for Bruce Birtwistle. Three months later the UAE just edged out Katzakatan at the 2012 Asian Five Nations to avoid relegation.

Hall's plans for the growth of the sport within the UAE, due in part to a program targeting national schools and the creation of an all-Emirati Shaheen development side which saw success at the Emirates International Sevens. However, after successes at the national level earlier in his tenure, the Falcons were relegated from the top tier following a 24–8 loss to the Philippines in the 2013 A5N tournament.

Following that defeat, Hall announced his resignation after only 17 months at the helm, citing a desire to return to Australia to reunite with family.

== Notes ==
Sporting positions
Preceded by (United States) Jack Clark	United States National Rugby Union Coach; 2000-2001	Succeeded by (United States) Tom Billups
