= Mike Tolkin =

American rugby union coach (born 1967)

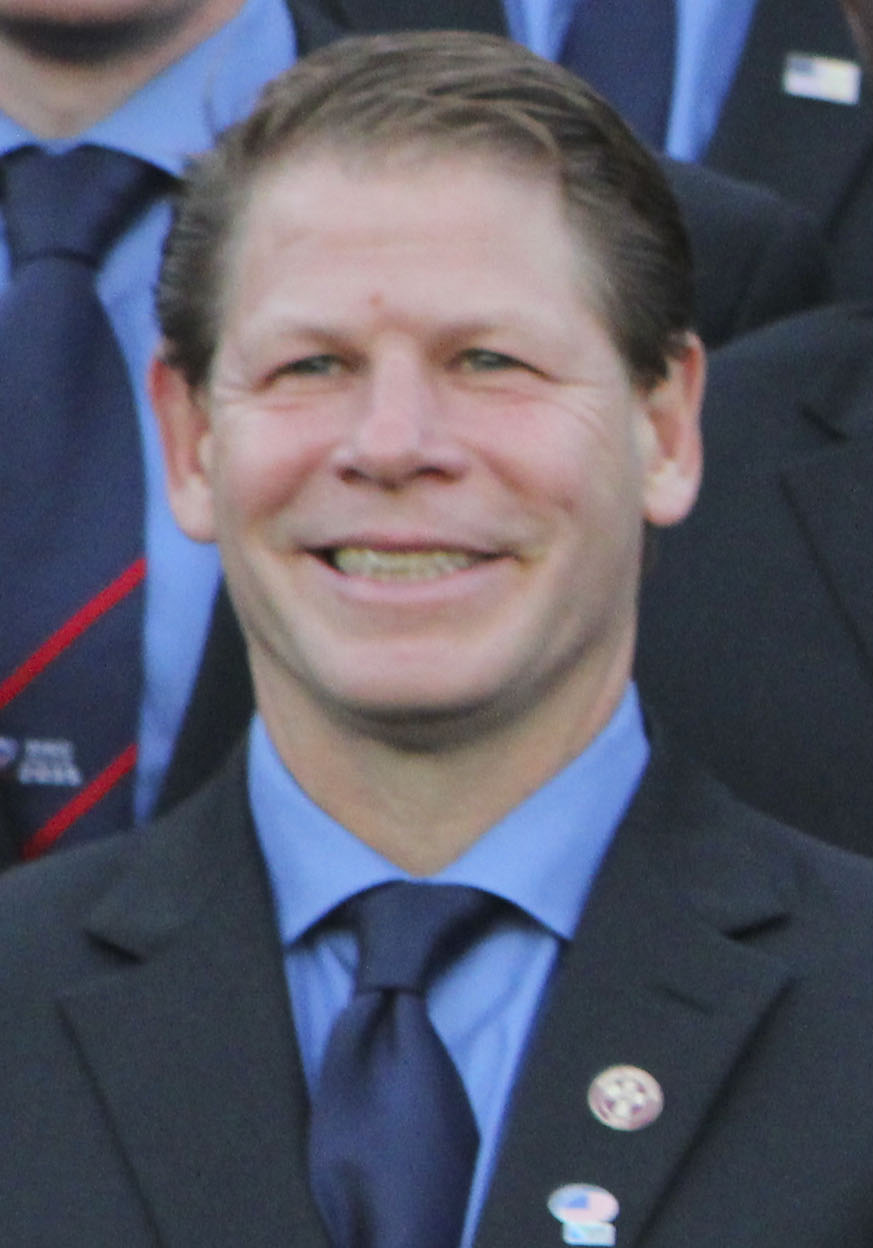
- Tolkin in October 2015
- Born: Michael Tolkin; 13 November 1967 (age 59)
- School: Xavier High School
- University: St. John's University
- Occupation: Rugby union coach

Rugby union career
- Position: Head Coach
Coaching career
- Years: Team
- 1987–2012: Xavier High School
- 1992: United States U-19 (Backs coach)
- 2000-2012: NYAC
- 2008–2012: United States (Defence coach)
- 2012–2015: United States (Head coach)
- 2016–2017: NYAC
- 2018–2019: RUNY
- Correct as of June 15, 2018

Mike Tolkin is a rugby union coach who served as head coach of the United States national team from 2012 until 2015. He was the head coach for Rugby United New York for the Major League Rugby 2019 Season. He is the current General Manager of Premier Rugby Sevens.

== Early life ==
Tolkin grew up in New York. He played rugby at Xavier High School where he graduated in 1985. He went on to play college soccer at St. John's University.

== Career ==
Tolkin, a rugby coach since 1986, was an English teacher at Xavier High School in New York, where he was the coach for the school's senior rugby team. He had an impressive record with the school, coaching them to three National Championships, six National Championship games, 17 National Championship Semifinals, and 20 Regional Championships.

At the age of 23, Tolkin helped establish the U.S. Under-19 team in 1992, and served as the backs coach for that team.

In 2000, he served as head coach of the New York Athletic Club in the Rugby Super League from 2000-2011. In 12 years, NYAC won three national championships during Tolkin's tenure. Having led NYAC to the national championship (along with leading Xavier to a national championship and his role as defensive coach for the USA Eagles) resulted in Mike Tolkin winning the 2010 Coach of the Year award by We Are Rugby magazine and by RugbyMag.

In 2008, Tolkin joined the United States national side as defence coach, which saw him play pivotal part in their 2011 Rugby World Cup campaign. The Eagles played well defensively during the 2011 RWC, limiting Tier 1 countries Ireland and Italy to 22 and 27 points respectively, and holding Russia to only 6 points. His ability to get the best out of players, which saw him specialize in talent identification and player development serving as a talent recognition selector in 2001 for former USA Head Coach Tom Billups, saw Tolkin promoted to Head Coach in 2012, taking over from Irishman Eddie O'Sullivan.

=== U.S. head coach ===
Tolkin was announced as head coach of the United States national rugby team on February 15, 2012. Tolkin set out with the stated aim of qualifying for the 2015 Rugby World Cup as Americas 1, and progressing out of the Pool Stages. Tolkin stated that, at the time of his hiring, he and the USA Rugby Board of Directors agreed the following goals:

- Create a positive squad culture and attitude among the Eagles,
- Create an excitement about following the Eagles,
- Move up in IRB Rankings (ranked 18th at the time), and start to beat higher-ranked teams,
- Create greater depth in the program,
- Turn the scrum into a solid attacking platform,
- Defeat Canada 3/4 times we play them, and
- Qualify for the 2015 Rugby World Cup.

Tolkin's first game in charge was against Canada in Kingston, Ontario. The United States failed to win this match, losing 28–25, though went on to defeat Georgia a week later. Discipline was a massive issue at the start of Tolkin's tenure, conceding 1 yellow card and 2 red cards in his opening three tests, with the 2 red cards being issued during the USA's 30–10 defeat to Italy in Houston.

In 2013, the United States, along with Canada, joined the IRB Pacific Nations Cup, which would see the two sides compete regularly against Pacific Islanders opposition. The U.S. debut in the tournament came on May 25, 2013 against Canada, which saw Canada claim a 16–9 victory. Despite this, the Eagles pushed a strong Irish team the following week, losing 15–12. USA failed to claim any win during the 2013 PNC, finishing last which just 1 bonus point win. In August 2015, the United States lost on aggregate 40–20 to Canada to fail to qualify for the World Cup as Americas 1. However, in March 2014, Tolkin guided the States to an aggregate score of 59–40 over Uruguay to qualify for the World Cup.

On June 21, 2014, Tolkin guided the States to their first victory over Canada since 2009, winning 38–35, which saw the States finish second in the Asia/Pacific 2014 PNC conference. Later that year, in front of a sold out Soldier Field, USA lost 74–6 to the All Blacks, the first test between the nations in America since 1913.

Then on September 5, 2015, the States played the Wallabies at the same venue, going down 47–10, though the half time score was 14–10 to Australia.

Though the U.S. did qualify for the 2015 Rugby World Cup, Tolkin failed to achieve a win in the tournament, losing to Samoa 25–16, Scotland 39–16, Japan 28–18 and South Africa 64–0, which saw the States finished last in their group.

=== Rugby United New York ===
Following the 2015 World Cup, Tolkin returned to coaching the New York Athletic Club, achieving an undefeated record for the 2016 season. Tolkin was retained as the temporary Head Coach for Rugby United New York (RUNY), New York City's Major League Rugby (MLR) franchise, for the 2018 exhibition season. In August 2018, Tolkin was appointed as the team's permanent Head Coach. Tolkin Led RUNY to a successful 2019 season, finishing with eleven wins and five losses. Under Tolkin RUNY made it to the semi-finals where they ultimately fell 22-24 to the San Diego Legion.

Shortly after the 2019 MLR season concluded, it was announced that Tolkin's tenure as Head Coach for RUNY was already over. Despite leading the team to a winning season, Tolkin reportedly struggled to get along with several of the team's top players as well as franchise owner James Kennedy.

== Honors ==
United States

- Americas Rugby Championship
  - Runners-up: 2013, 2014

Xavier High School

- East Coast High School Rugby Championship
  - Winners: 1989, 1992, 1993, 1994, 1997, 1998, 2000, 2001, 2002
  - Runners-up: 1987, 1988, 1991, 1996
- National High School Rugby Championship
  - Winners: 1993, 2010
  - Runners-up: 1997, 2011
- NRU Championship (Replaced EC HS Rugby Championship in 2003)
  - Winners: 2003, 2004, 2005, 2006, 2007, 2008, 2009, 2010, 2011

New York Athletic Club

- Rugby Super League
  - Winners: 2005, 2008, 2010
- US Div. 1 National Championship
  - Runners-up: 2001

== See also ==
- United States national rugby union team
- United States national under-20 rugby union team
- New York Athletic Club RFC
- USA Rugby

Sporting positions
Preceded by (Republic of Ireland) Eddie O'Sullivan	United States National Rugby Union Coach; 2012–2015	Succeeded by (New Zealand) John Mitchell
