= 1998 United States rugby union tour of Portugal and Spain =

Summary
P	W	D	L
Total
3	3	0	0
Test match
2	2	0	0
Opponent
P	W	D	L
Portugal
1	1	0	0
Spain
1	1	0	0

Tour chronology
- ← Wales 1997 Fiji 1998 →

The United States national rugby union team toured Portugal and Spain in April 1998.

== Results ==
Date	Home team	Score	Away team	Venue	
1 April 1998	Portugal U22	7 – 50	USA	Lisbon	
4 April 1998	Portugal	5 – 61	USA	Lisbon	Test match
12 April 1998	Spain	3 – 49	USA	El Puerto de Santa María	Test match
