= 1994 United States rugby union tour of Ireland =

- Manager: Jack Clark
Summary
P	W	D	L
Total
4	1	0	3
Test match
1	0	0	1
Opponent
P	W	D	L
Ireland
1	0	0	1

Tour chronology
- ← Japan 1990 Wales 1997 →

The 1994 United States rugby union tour was a series of matches played in Ireland in November 1994 by the United States national rugby union team.

== Background ==
Four days prior to competing in their first international test match against Ireland, a full USA side beat an Ireland Development side 20–13 at The Sportsground on 1 November 1994.

== Matches ==
Scores and results list United States's points tally first.

Opposing Team	For	Against	Date	Venue	Match
Ireland Developmental	20	13	November 1, 1994	The Sportsground	Tour match
Ireland	15	26	November 5, 1994	Lansdowne Road, Dublin	Test match
Irish Students	9	11	November 9, 1994		Tour match
Leinster	6	9	November 12, 1994	Donnybrook Stadium, Donnybrook, Dublin	Tour match

== Test Match ==
5 November 1994

Ireland	26–15	United States
	Report

Lansdowne Road, Dublin
