= 1985 United States rugby union tour of Japan =

- Manager: Ron Mayes
- Tour captain: Whit Everett
Summary
P	W	D	L
Total
6	6	0	1
Test match
1	1	0	0
Opponent
P	W	D	L
Japan
1	1	0	0

Tour chronology
- ← Australia 1983 Wales 1987 →

The 1985 United States rugby union tour of Japan was a series of matches played in April 1985 in Japan by United States national rugby union team.

== Background ==
This tour marked the first meeting between the international teams of USA and Japan. Including non-test matches this was the United States' first undefeated tour of another nation. Whit Everett served as captain in the USA's victory over Japan in the lone test match.

== Matches ==
Scores and results list United States's points tally first.

Opposing Team	For	Against	Date	Venue	Match
Kyushu	20	10	April 3, 1985		Tour match
Japan Universities	29	11	April 7, 1985		Tour match
Kansai	29	3	April 11, 1985		Tour match
Japan A	28	16	April 14, 1985		Tour Match
Kanto	34	9	April 17, 1985		Tour match
Japan	16	15	April 21, 1985	Chichibunomiya Rugby Stadium, Minato, Tokyo	Test match

== Test Match ==
21 April 1985

Japan	15–16	United States
Try: Koshiyama; Con: Honjo (1/1); Pen: Honjo (3)	Report	Try: Jefferson; Con: Inns (0/1); Pen: Inns (4)

Chichibunomiya Rugby Stadium, Minato, Tokyo
Attendance: 20,000
Referee: Michael Farnworth (New Zealand)
