= Eddie O'Sullivan =

Irish rugby union player & coach and Gaelic footballer

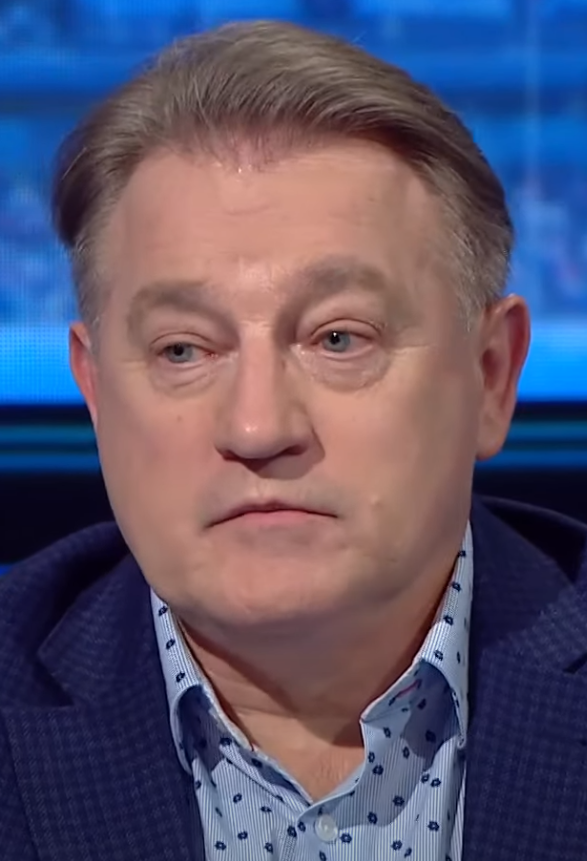
- Eddie O'Sullivan in January 2020
- Born: 21 November 1958 (age 67) Youghal, County Cork, Ireland
- Height: 5 ft 6 in (168 cm)

Rugby union career
Coaching career
- Years: Team
- 1997–1999: United States (assistant coach)
- 2001–2008: Ireland
- 2011: United States
- 2014-2015: Biarritz
- 2017-18: Old Belvedere
- 2021-Present: Brown University

Official website
- www.eddieosullivan.ie

Eddie O'Sullivan (born 21 November 1958) is an Irish rugby union coach, player (wing & fly-half) and a former Gaelic footballer. He is a former head coach of Buccaneers RFC the United States national rugby union team and of the Ireland national rugby union team. He was head coach of Biarritz Olympique, who play in the second tier of France, until October 2015.

== Early career ==
O'Sullivan was born in Youghal, Cork, Ireland. After attending the Christian Brothers school in the town, he graduated from Thomond College, which a decade later became part of the University of Limerick.

O'Sullivan played for the Garryowen Football Club during the 1970s and 1980s at fly-half and wing, while teaching physical education, maths, and science in Mountbellew, County Galway. He played for Munster between 1983 and 1986 on the wing and got capped for Ireland A in 1984. He also played Gaelic Football. In 1982, he played corner forward on the Mountbellew Moylough Gaelic football team. He was fitness advisor to the Galway Senior Football Team, managed by John O'Mahony, which won two All-Ireland Senior Football Titles in 1998 and 2001.

== Coaching career ==
He started his coaching career at Monivea Rugby Club in north-east Galway in the early 1980s while still a teacher. He worked as a development officer for the Irish Rugby Football Union between 1988 and 1991. During that time and up until 1992, he was the fitness advisor to the Irish Rugby Team, under head coach Ciaran Fitzgerald. He followed this with spells coaching at Blackrock College, (first as assistant, then as head coach) Connacht as assistant coach and head coach between 1992 and 1996 and the Irish Under-21 side. The Under-21 side won the 1996 Triple Crown, beating Clive Woodward's England. Between 1997 and 1999, while working in the US he continued to coach the Buccaneers Rugby Club in Connacht, who won promotion from Division 3 to Division 1 of the All-Ireland League and reaching the Top 4 of the tournament in their 1st season in Division 1.

After failing to secure a high-profile coaching position in Ireland, O'Sullivan moved to America to coach the US Eagles, where he worked as forwards coach at the 1999 Rugby World Cup He also worked as technical director to USA Rugby between 1997 and 1999. As technical director he developed and delivered the USA Rugby Coach Education Programme, which certifier coaches at Foundation, Level I, Level II and Level III. He was then appointed as the assistant coach of the Irish national side in 1999 as the Backs Coach. During his time as assistant coach he was credited with advancing Irish back play considerably while working with players such as Brian O'Driscoll, Ronan O'Gara, Peter Stringer, Rob Henderson, Shane Horgan and Denis Hickie. In 2001 he was appointed head coach following the controversial departure of Warren Gatland.

== Ireland ==
In his first year Ireland finished third-place in the 2002 Six Nations Championship. O'Sullivan's Ireland went on to achieve second place in 2003, only losing the Grand Slam in the final match against England. At the 2003 Rugby World Cup his team lost to France in the quarter-finals.

Ireland again missed out in the 2004 Six Nations Championship, losing the Grand Slam to France this time, but went on to win Ireland's first Triple Crown in 19 years. While transitioning the team during the 2005, O'Sullivan's side finished in third place with defeats by France and Wales. In 2006 defeat to France cost Ireland the Championship. In 2007 again Ireland lost the championship to France on points difference. On the final day of the tournament despite defeating Italy heavily in Rome (51–24), France defeated Scotland with a controversial try in the final minute of the game to again deny Ireland a 6 Nations Championship. The fact that the French played later in the day than Ireland gave them an advantage of knowing exactly what score they needed to secure the Championship. This fuelled the discussion about games not kicking off at the same time on the final day of the tournament.

During his tenure as head coach to Ireland O'Sullivan won 3 Triple Crowns, in 2004, 2006 and 2007. Ireland also defeated Australia twice (2002 & 2006) and South Africa twice (2004 & 2006). Ireland defeated England in the Six Nations Championship over four consecutive years (2004–2007) including a record victory (43–13) at the iconic Croke Park Stadium in 2007. O'Sullivan also coached the Barbarians R.F.C. to victory over the 2007 World Cup Champions South Africa in November 2007.

=== 2007 World Cup campaign ===
In August 2007, O'Sullivan's contract with the IRFU was extended for a further four years, which meant that he was contracted to be in charge of the Irish Rugby Team until 2012. Part of the terms of the contract allowed him to leave the position temporarily to coach the 2009 Lions squad, were he to be offered that role. Soon, however, he was the subject of press criticism after a run of poor results. Ireland turned in poor performances in the opening matches of the World Cup against the lower rated Georgia and Namibia. They had previously also struggled in pre-tournament games against Italy and Scotland. Criticisms included a failure to inspire passion in the team and a lack of depth in the squad, which has been said to have caused complacency in the first team players. Many began to see the signing of his contract as a premature move. Rumours have abounded of conflict in the Irish during the tournament, and even that Geordan Murphy might leave the squad as a result of being dropped from the bench for the French game. The poor performances continued with the failure of Ireland, for the second time in its history, to qualify for the quarter-final stages of the World Cup, finishing third in its group with two wins and two losses. After an extensive post Rugby World Cup review it was established that, despite rumours during the tournament, there was no discord among the playing squad. The failure to perform was identified as an over emphasis on strength and conditioning prior to the tournament along with only 2 pre-tournament warm-up games, leaving the squad short of match preparation.

=== End of Irish career ===
On 19 March 2008, O'Sullivan resigned from his job after a disappointing 6 Nations campaign. O'Sullivan finished with an overall success rate of 64% during his tenure with Ireland. During his time Ireland reached 3rd in the World Rugby ranking on 2 occasions in 2003 and 2006.

O'Sullivan released his autobiography, Never Die Wondering ISBN 978-1-84605-399-3, in autumn 2009. It was written with sports writer Vincent Hogan.

== United States ==
In 2009 the position of head coach to the USA Eagles Men's team came open when Scott Johnson announced he would leave the team at the end of the 2008–09 season to move to Ospreys of the Celtic League. O'Sullivan's agent reported on 16 February that O'Sullivan had signed a deal that would see him coach the United States through the 2011 World Cup. His hiring was officially announced on 4 March. O'Sullivan coached the USA Eagles from 2009 up until the end of the 2011 Rugby World Cup. It was O'Sullivan's 5th appearance at a Rugby World Cup in a coaching capacity (RWC 1991 S&C coach Ireland, RWC 1999 assistant coach USA, 2003 head coach Ireland, 2007 head coach Ireland, 2011 head coach USA)

== Biarritz Olympique ==
In May 2014 O'Sullivan was confirmed as head coach of Biarritz Olympique. Relegated from the Top 14 following the 2013–14 season, Biarritz played in the Pro D2 league in 2014–15. O'Sullivan left Biarritz Olympique in October 2015.

== Brown University ==
O'Sullivan has had ties with Ivy League College, Brown University, in Providence Rhode Island for many years. In recent years he has been listed as a Coaching Consultant on the men's rugby website. In the last number of years O'Sullivan has been heavily involved with the men's rugby program at Brown University running their pre-season camp while technically and tactically advising the team throughout the season. 2021 saw Brown University win their 1st Ivy League Championship for 25 years. The 2022 season was even more successful for Brown when they won a consecutive Ivy League Championship and were also crowned Liberty Conference Champions and NCR Division 1 National Champions for the 1st time in their 60-year history. In 2023 O'Sullivan moved to Providence, Rhode Island to work with Brown University on a full time basis. In 2023 Brown University again won the Ivy league Championship for the 3rd consecutive year and also their 2nd consecutive Liberty conference, while also reaching the Final Four of the National Championship. In 2024, he completed another Ivy and Liberty Championship, as well as gaining Brown their second National title in three years. https://www.brownrugby.com

Sporting positions
| Preceded by (New Zealand) Warren Gatland | Ireland National Rugby Union Coach; 2002–2008 | Succeeded by (Republic of Ireland) Declan Kidney |
| Preceded by (Australia) Scott Johnson | United States National Rugby Union Coach; 2009–2011 | Succeeded by (United States) Mike Tolkin |
