= Tony Flay =

US international rugby union player

Anthony Flay
- Born: 15 January 1964 (age 62) Rotorua, New Zealand

Rugby union career
- Position: Hooker
International career
Years	Team	Apps	(Points)
1990–1991	United States	7	(4)

Anthony Flay (born 15 January 1964) is a New Zealand born rugby union player who played hooker for the U.S. national rugby team from 1990 to 1991.

Flay was born in Rotorua, New Zealand. During his youth in New Zealand, he played for the Bay of Plenty R.F.C. and for the All Blacks U-19 team.

In 1983, Flay emigrated to the United States. He lived in Seattle and played for the Old Puget Sound Beach RFC. Flay earned seven starts at hooker for the U.S. national rugby team from 1990 to 1991, including two starts at the 1991 Rugby World Cup. Flay made his debut for the U.S. national team on 23 September 1990 against Japan in Tokyo, scoring a try in his debut.

Since 2004, Flay has held several coaching and leadership positions in rugby in New Zealand and in the United States. Since 2016, Flay has been a skills coach for Crusaders International Academy.
