= 1987 United States rugby union tour of Wales =

Summary
P	W	D	L
Total
7	2	0	5
Test match
2	0	0	2
Opponent
P	W	D	L
Wales
1	0	0	1
Canada
1	0	0	1

Tour chronology
- ← Japan 1985 Australia 1990 →

The 1987 United States rugby union tour of Wales was a series of six matches played by the United States national rugby union team in Wales in October and November 1987. The United States team won two of their six matches, and lost the other four, including the international match against the Wales national rugby union team. The "Eagles" lost also a test against Canada, played returning home. 7

== Matches ==
Scores and results list United States's points tally first.

Opposing Team	For	Against	Date	Venue
Breconshire	9	15	21 October	Brecon
Ebbw Vale	14	16	24 October	Eugene Cross Park, Ebbw Vale
Glamorgan Wanderers	6	25	28 October	Memorial Ground, Ely, Cardiff
Neath	15	6	31 October	The Gnoll, Neath
Pembrokeshire	21	15	3 November	Whitland
Wales	0	46	7 November	Cardiff Arms Park, Cardiff
Canada	12	20	14 November	Victoria
