= Gary Gold =

South African rugby union coach

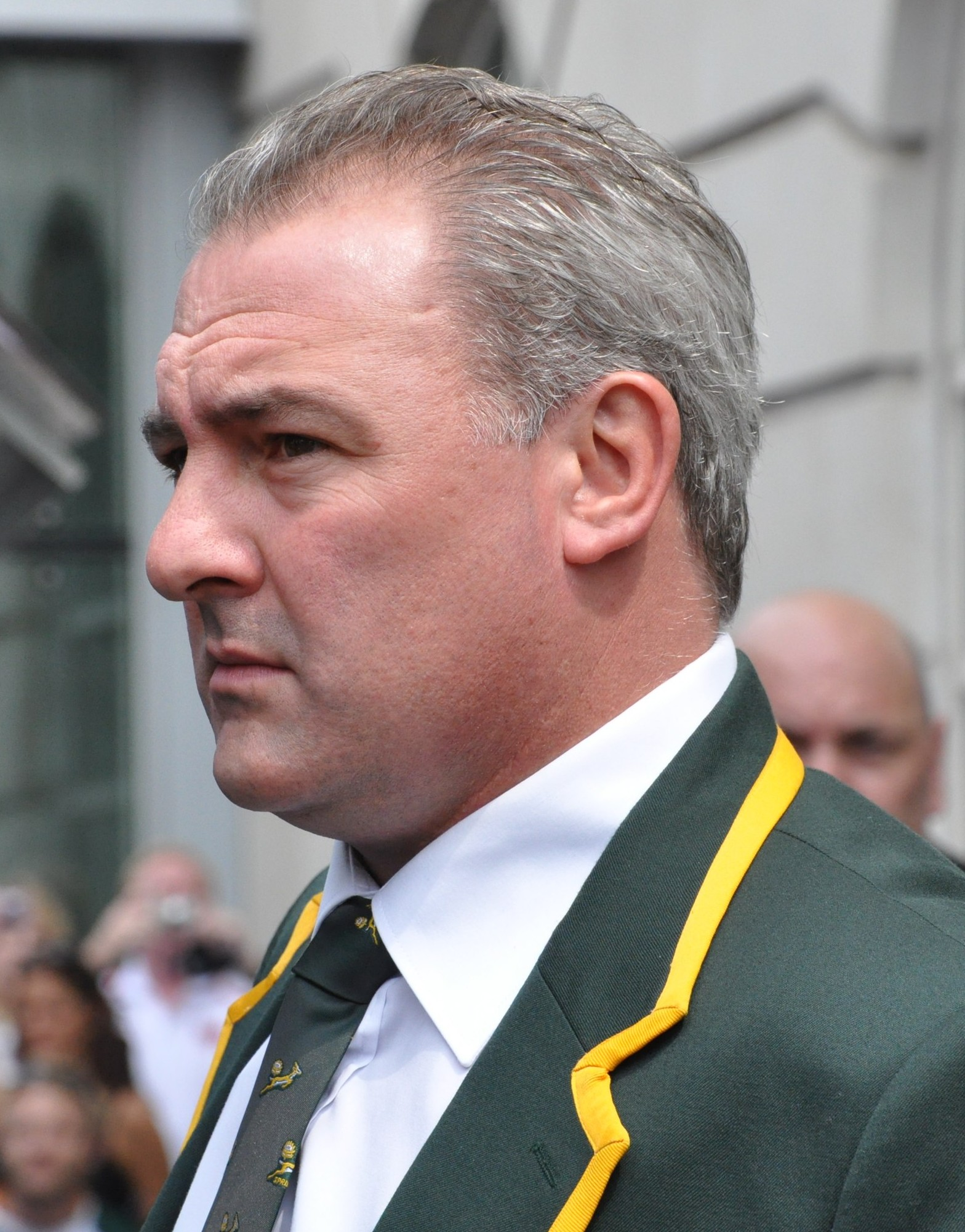
- Born: Gary Gold; 6 July 1967 (age 59) Cape Town, Cape Province, South Africa
- School: Wynberg Boys' High School

Rugby union career
Coaching career
- Years: Team
- 2001–2003: London Irish (forwards coach)
- 2003–2005: London Irish
- 2005–2007: Western Province (forwards coach)
- 2007–2008: Western Province
- 2008–2011: South Africa (assistant coach)
- 2012: Newcastle Falcons (Interim)
- 2012–2013: Bath
- 2013: Bath (Director of Rugby)
- 2014–2015: Kobelco Steelers
- 2015–2016: Sharks
- 2016–2017: Worcester Warriors (Director of Rugby)
- 2018–2022: United States
- Correct as of 6 January 2018

Gary Gold (born 6 July 1967) is a South African rugby union coach who has coached at various levels of the game in England, Japan and South Africa. He was until December 2022 the head coach of the United States.

== Coaching career ==
=== London Irish ===
Gold joined London Irish in July 2001 as forwards coach under newly appointed head coach Brendan Venter. The South African duo formed a strong partnership in their first year at London Irish, guiding their team to fourth on the table at the end of the regular 2001–02 Premiership Season. However they were knocked out at the quarter-finals stage, losing to Northampton Saints 38–14. However, in the European Challenge Cup, London Irish made it to the semi-final, only to lose to Welsh side Pontypridd RFC 33–27. Despite London Irish making the final in the two major competitions, they did make and win the final of the 2001–02 Powergen Cup, defeating the Saints 38–7.

The 2002–03 season proved more difficult than their debut season, failing to advance to knock-out rugby in any of the two major competitions, finishing ninth in the Premiership, and second in pool 5 of the 2002–03 Heineken Cup. At the end of that season, Venter left his role at London Irish and Gary Gold was promoted to head coach.

Gold's first season in charge saw London Irish struggle further, finishing eighth in the Premiership, and being knocked out by Narbonne in the second round of the 2003–04 European Challenge Cup. His second season proved even more of a struggle, slipping to tenth in the Premiership and again being knocked out in the second round of the 2004–05 European Challenge Cup by Pau. An unimpressive stint as head coach of London Irish saw Gold leave the side at the end of the 2004–05 season to return to South Africa.

=== Western Province ===
At the end of the 2004–05 season, Gold was offered a chance to return to his native Cape Town; London Irish agreed to release him from his contract, and he returned to South Africa to take up the role of forwards coach at Western Province. After two seasons as forwards coach, and back-to-back knock-outs in the semi-final, Gold took on the role of head coach at Western Province in July 2007 after Kobus Van Der Merwe and Jerome Paarwater resigned from their positions at the club.

In the two years Gold spent at Western Province as head coach between 2007 and 2008, Western Province just missed out on advancing through to the knock-out stage of the Currie Cup. Missing out on points difference in 2007 and being one point behind the Golden Lions in 2008. Gold stood down at the end of that season, focusing on his assistant coaching role with the South African national team.

=== Springboks Assistant Coach ===
In May 2008 Gold was appointed by Peter de Villiers as an assistant coach of the Springboks, a position he held until after the 2011 Rugby World Cup when De Villiers resigned from his role. Gold gained much successes with the national team, helping his side defeat all of the other Tier 1 nations at least once; including three victories against the All Blacks during the 2009 Tri Nations Series. He was assistant during the 2009 British & Irish Lions tour to South Africa, which saw the Boks secure a 2–1 series victory over the British & Irish Lions, the first South African side to do so since 1980.

After South Africa was knocked out at the quarter finals of the 2011 Rugby World Cup by Australia, losing 11–9, head coach Peter de Villiers immediately resigned in the post-match press conference. His coaching staff soon followed after the South African Rugby Union announced there would be a complete new coaching set-up named ahead of the 2012 international season.

=== Return to English Premiership ===
==== Newcastle Falcons ====
In January 2012, with Newcastle Falcons nine points adrift in the relegation zone of the Aviva Premiership, they announced that Gold and Mike Ford would join the club on an interim contract until the end of the season. Gold was made head coach while Ford was named defence coach.

Despite best efforts of the two coaches, leading the side to multiple bonus points and four wins, the Falcons were unable to close the gap between them and London Wasps. Newcastle Falcons were ultimately relegated at the end of the 2011–12 English Premiership, with 32 points on the table, just behind the Wasps on 33.

==== Bath ====
In May 2012 Bath appointed Gold as head coach of a coaching team that included Ford, Brad Davis, Toby Booth and Neil Hatley. Initially, performances looked promising for the side, hovering around mid-table for most of the season. However inconsistent performances in 2013 meant Bath were unable to get much above seventh on the table, narrowly missing out on a Heineken Cup seed for the 2013–14 season. However, the 2012–13 European Challenge Cup looked more promising for Bath, topping their pool with six from six wins, to see them through to the quarter-finals. Bath were drawn against French side Stade Français, which was a step too far for Bath, who lost 36–20.

After a lacklustre season, Gold was elevated to Director of Rugby, with Ford becoming head coach for the 2013–14 season. However, on 9 December 2013, Gold departed the club despite Bath winning five in seven games in the Premiership, and leading their pool in European Challenge Cup with three wins in three games. Ford, a man known for his regular upstaging of people he worked with, was instrumental in convincing Bath owner, Bruce Craig, to replace Gold. This was a view that was widely frowned upon by many supporters and players. Ford was in charge of the team that got to the Premiership final, until he too was fired a year later for inappropriate management of players and staff at Bath. Gold was soon vindicated post the Ford era.

=== Japan stint ===
Following time out away from rugby, Gold took up a role in Japan, becoming head coach of Kobelco Steelers. In his short stint in Japan, he helped Kobelco Steelers to top of the table at the end of the regular 2014–15 Top League Season. Despite having to play fourth seed Yamaha Júbilo, who they had beaten 40–10 during the pool stage, the Steelers went on to lose 41–12 in the semi-finals.

=== Sharks ===
In October 2014, Gold was named head coach of the Super Rugby side Sharks following the surprise resignation of Jake White who had led the Sharks to the semi-finals of the 2014 Super Rugby season. Gold joined the side at the conclusion of the 2014–15 Top League Season, which was just three weeks before the Sharks' opening game of the 2015 Super Rugby season, against the Cheetahs; the game was lost 35–29. Gold got his first win as Sharks head coach the following week, defeating the Lions 29–12. The Sharks later went on to win just six of their next fourteen games, to see them slump to 11th on the table, a massive drop from the preceding season.

The 2015 Currie Cup proved just as difficult, winning just four games in ten matches to finish out of the qualifying positions for the semi-finals, the first time this has happened in ten years.

In the newly formatted Super Rugby, the Sharks improved during the 2016 Super Rugby season, finishing eighth on the overall table. However, they were humiliated by the Hurricanes in the quarter-finals, losing 41–0. Remaining as Director of Rugby for the 2016 Currie Cup, Robert du Preez coaching, the Sharks narrowly missed out on a semi-final position, after losing to the Golden Lions 28–16 in the final round of the Currie Cup. A month later, Gold left his position at the Sharks following a poor run of results across his two-year stint. He left the Sharks a year early on his contract.

=== Worcester Warriors ===
In late January 2017, Gold was appointed as the Director of Rugby at English Premiership side Worcester Warriors. Initially contracted with the club until the end of the 2016–17 English Premiership season, Gold helped the side stay afloat in the Premiership, thirteen points clear of relegated side Bristol. In April of that year, Gold committed his future to the side and will remain with the club until at least the end of the 2017–18 English Premiership season.

The 2017–18 season was slow starting, losing the first six games of the season, before defeating Brive during the first round of the 2017–18 European Rugby Challenge Cup. It wasn't until another three weeks before they gained their second win of the season, beating Northampton Saints 30–15 in round 8 of the Premiership. With the club struggling, Alan Solomons joined the club as a short-term assistant to Gold, in a bid to try and keep the club in the top level of English rugby. However, before this appointment was made, on the 2 October 2017, it was announced that Gold would not be resign with the club, after he was named the new head coach the United States, a role he initially wasn't set to start until the conclusion of the 2017–18 season. On 23 December 2017, Gold was granted an early release from Worcester Warriors so he could commit earlier to his new appointment.

=== United States national team ===
On 2 October 2017, USA Rugby announced that Gold would be the new head coach of the U.S. national team, effective at the end of the 2017-18 English Premiership season, ahead of the 2018 June Internationals. Gold was not available for the Eagles 2017 European tour, and initially wasn't available for the 2018 Americas Rugby Championship. However, after an early release from Worcester Warriors, Gold took reign of the Eagles on 1 January 2018 ready for the 2018 ARC.

Gold's first match in charge was on 3 February, where he led his side to a 17–10 victory over Argentina XV. The United States continued their dominance over their neighbors Canada the following week, defeating them 29–10, before defeating Chile 45–13 in their last home test of the ARC. In round 4, the Eagles gained their first ever victory over Brazil in Brazil, winning 45–16, before claiming the Championship in round 5 after defeating Uruguay 61–19 in Montevideo. The Eagles became the first team to win all five matches in the Championship and to retain the Championship title across two years. During the 2018 Summer Test Series, Gold became the first head coach of Americas to lead the Eagles to a win all their games during the June test window. This included a record 62–13 victory over Russia, a first ever win over Scotland (30–29), which was the Eagles first win over a Tier 1 nation in the professional era, and a 42–17 win over Canada. The 2018 November test window saw the United States claim two wins in four games; with victories over Samoa (their first ever win against the Manu) and Romania.

In Gold's first major campaign, he helped lead the United States to a "decider" match at the conclusion of the 2019 World Rugby Pacific Nations Cup. After victories over Canada and Samoa, it was a winner takes all match in the final round match between the US and Japan. The match saw Japan take victory 34–20, and with other results the USA finished third on the table.

Gold led the U.S. in its qualifying campaign for the 2023 Rugby World Cup. In Americas regional qualifying, the U.S. won a series against Canada but lost series to Uruguay and Chile. In the inter-continental playoff for the last qualifying spot, the US failed to beat Portugal, and thus did not qualify for the World Cup. Gold stepped down as US head coach at the end of 2022.

=== Bulls ===
Following the Bulls' inability to acquire their defense coach, Jake White appointed Gary to work with the Bulls squad for the 2023/2024 season as the defense coordinator. The Bulls compete as a South African franchise team and secured wins over Saracens and Lyon Rugby in the Investec Champions Cup competition, before exiting in the quarterfinals.

The Bulls defeated Leinster Rugby in their semi final to reach their third United Rugby Championship Final in two years. This victory secured the Bulls the local trophy for the highest-ranked South African franchise in 2024. The Bulls subsequently lost in the final to the Glasgow Warriors.

==== Honours ====
- Americas Rugby Championship
  - Winners: 2018

== Honours ==
South Africa (as assistant coach)

- Tri Nations Series
  - Winners: 2009
- Freedom Cup
  - Winners: 2009
- Mandela Challenge Plate
  - Winners: 2009
- British & Irish Lions–South Africa Series Trophy
  - Winners: 2009
- Prince William Cup
  - Winners: 2008, 2010

London Irish (as assistant coach)

- Powergen Cup
  - Winners: 2002

Sporting positions
Preceded by (New Zealand) Dave Hewett (Interim)	USA national rugby union coach 2018–2022	Succeeded by (United States) Scott Lawrence
