= 1977 United States rugby union tour of England =

Summary
P	W	D	L
Total
6	2	0	4
Test match
1	0	0	1
Opponent
P	W	D	L
England XV
1	0	0	1

Tour chronology
- ← England and France 1924 Australia 1983 →

The 1977 United States rugby union tour of England was a series of six matches played by the U.S.A. "Eagles" in England in September and October 1977. The United States team won two of the six matches, and lost the other four, including the international match against the England national rugby union team in front 15,000 at Twickenham Stadium. England did not award full international caps for this match and the team was described as "An England XV" rather than simply "England".

== Matches ==
Scores and results list United States's points tally first.

Opposing Team	For	Against	Date	Venue	Attendance	Ref.
Civil Service	15	6	28 September	Gloucester		
Cornwall	11	12	1 October	Camborne		
Coventry	6	33	5 October	Coundon Road, Coventry		
Gosforth	12	18	8 October	Gosforth		
Cambridge University	20	18	12 October	Grange Road, Cambridge		
England XV	11	37	15 October	Twickenham, London	15,000	

== Sources ==
- Vivian Jenkins (ed.). Rothmans Rugby Yearbook 1978-79. Macdonald and Jane's. pp. 45–48. ISBN 0-354-09047-X.
