= Peter Thorburn =

New Zealand rugby union player (1939–2021)

Peter Thorburn MNZM
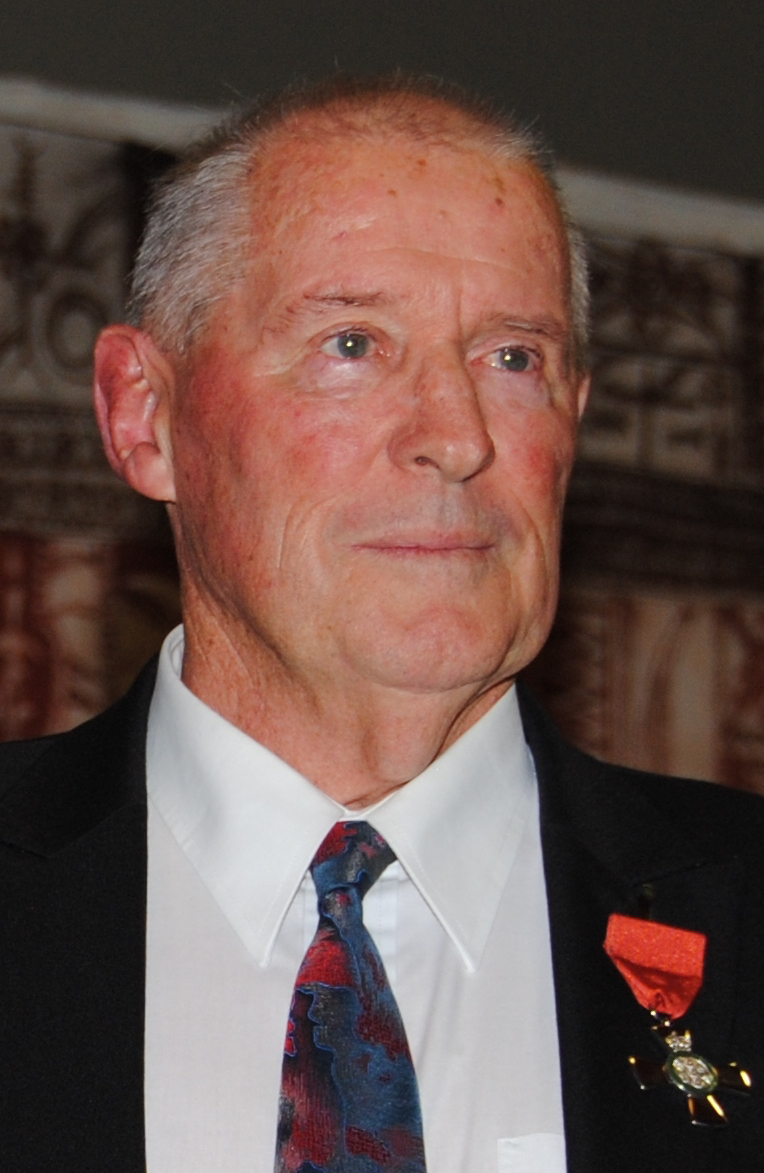
- Thorburn in 2013
- Born: Peter Robert Tyler Thorburn; 19 March 1939 Auckland, New Zealand
- Died: 26 January 2021 (aged 81) Takapuna, New Zealand

Rugby union career
- Position: No. 8
Provincial / State sides
| Years | Team | Apps | (Points) |
| 1965–1970 | Auckland | 40 | |
Coaching career
- Years: Team
- 1985–1991, 1997: North Harbour
- 1988–1990, 1993: New Zealand sevens
- 2001–2003: Bristol Rugby
- 2006–2007: United States

Peter Robert Tyler Thorburn MNZM (19 March 1939 – 26 January 2021) was a New Zealand rugby union player and coach. He played his entire career as a number eight for Auckland from 1965 to 1970. He became a coach after his playing career ended, coaching domestically at first for North Harbour and the New Zealand national rugby sevens team. He later coached in England with Bristol Rugby from 2001 to 2003, before becoming interim head coach of the United States national rugby union team and guiding the side to the 2007 Rugby World Cup. He was also a selector for the All Blacks.

== Early life and playing career ==
Thorburn was born in Auckland on 19 March 1939 to Francis Thorburn and Frances Burk. He completed his primary education at Papakura, Pātea, and Gladstone primary schools, before attending Mount Albert Grammar School. He subsequently completed a pharmacy apprenticeship from 1956 to 1959. Thorburn made his debut for Auckland in 1965. He ended up making 40 appearances with the team before playing his final game with them in 1970.

== Coaching career ==
After retiring as a player, Thorburn became coach of the North Harbour rugby team. He served in this capacity from the founding of the union in 1985 until 1991. He later identified the team's promotion to Division One of the National Provincial Championship in only its third season as the highlight of his career. He concurrently served as coach for the New Zealand national rugby sevens team from 1988 to 1990. He briefly rejoined the sevens team in 1993, until Gordon Tietjens became coach the following year.

Thorburn's first stint as a selector for the New Zealand national rugby union team came in 1992. He served alongside Earle Kirton under coach Laurie Mains until 1994, when he was replaced by Lin Colling. Three years later, he became coach of North Harbour again for the 1997 season. His second spell as selector with the All Blacks came in 2000 until 2001, this time with Wayne Smith as coach. Thorburn dismissed concerns that his previous tenure as a rugby commentator would impact his work as a selector, maintaining that he "may have criticised a particular performance but that's as far as I've gone". He added that he would never publicly criticise players because they do not have "the right of reply".

Thorburn became Director of Rugby at English club Bristol Rugby during the second half of the 2001–02 season, initially on a three-month contract. The club advanced to the final of the Zurich Championship that season, and also qualified for the following year's Heineken Cup. After Dean Ryan quit as head coach, Thorburn was offered the position with a two-year deal. The following season saw Bristol relegated from the Premiership. He consequently quit as head coach with one more season remaining on his contract and went back to New Zealand. He had earlier spoken out against a proposed merger with Bath, but accepted the possibility of such an outcome when relegation became imminent. The club was ultimately saved.

Thorburn was named a Life Member of the North Harbour Union in 2005, becoming only the third individual to be bestowed this honour. That same year, he was appointed as a selector for the New Zealand national under-19 rugby union team and served in that role until 2006. He also worked for the International Rugby Academy and acted as a consultant for Manawatu Rugby Union. Thorburn was appointed interim coach of the United States national rugby union team in April 2006. Although his contract was only supposed to last through World Cup qualifying, it was extended through to the competition proper in December 2006 after a series of strong performances. The team was expected to perform adequately despite being placed in a difficult pool at 2007 Rugby World Cup finals, but Thorburn regretted the fact that the team played few warm-up games against strong opposition. After a promising 10–28 loss to England, the USA lost their remaining three games, managing only to achieve a single bonus point in the 21–25 loss to Samoa. Despite the fact that his side had to play two games in the space of five days, Thorburn declined to pinpoint the schedule as the reason for their loss.

When asked about racism in rugby in January 2009, Thorburn recognised that it did indeed exist in the sport. However, he believed it was a mistake to target rugby for special criticism, as racism was no more widespread there than it was in other parts of the populace. He contended the sport had actually "done more for race relations than just about any other section of society", and thus it was "unfair to label rugby as racist".

== Personal life ==
Thorburn worked at Kempthorne Prosser from 1968 until 1973. He then started a pharmaceutical company named Pharmaceutical Sales and Marketing (PSM) Ltd. with his business partner, Tony Fountain, in 1974, shortly after Thorburn stopped playing professional rugby. He sold PSM in 1987, but stayed on as managing director for five years. His first wife, Jocelyn, died in 1991, and he subsequently remarried. He had two children: Julie and Lee. He moved with his second wife, Sarnia, from the North Shore to Ōmaha in the late 1990s.

After retiring from coaching, Thorburn appeared weekly on Radio Sport and also contributed to a blog. Aside from rugby, he had a keen interest in Thoroughbred racing, with two of the horses he owned, Calm Harbour and Greene Street, winning Group I races. In the 2013 New Year Honours, Thorburn was appointed a Member of the New Zealand Order of Merit for services to rugby.

Thorburn died on 26 January 2021 at North Shore Hospital in Takapuna. He was 81, and had suffered from dementia prior to his death. His funeral was held four days later on 30 January at North Harbour Stadium.

Sporting positions
| Preceded by (United States) Tom Billups | United States National Rugby Union Coach; 2006–2007 | Succeeded by (Australia) Scott Johnson |
