= 1999 United States rugby union tour of Australia and Great Britain =

Summary
P	W	D	L
Total
5	0	0	5
Test match
1	0	0	1
Opponent
P	W	D	L
England
1	0	0	1

Tour chronology
- ← Fiji 1998 Scotland and Wales 2000 →

The 1999 United States rugby union tour of Australia, England and Wales was a series of matches played in July and August 1999 in Australia, England and Wales by the USA national rugby union team in order to prepare the 1999 Rugby World Cup.

== Results ==
Scores and results list USA's points tally first.

Opposing team	For	Against	Date	Venue	Status	Ref.
Emerging NSW	8	57	July 21, 1999	Sydney	Tour match	
Queensland XV	17	27	July 24, 1999	Brisbane	Tour match	
England A	9	57	August 17, 1999	Northampton	Tour match	
England	8	106	August 21, 1999	Twickenham, London	Test match	
Wales XV	24	53	August 28, 1999	Millennium, Cardiff	Tour match	
