= 1990 United States rugby union tour of Australia =

Summary
P	W	D	L
Total
6	3	1	2
Test match
1	0	0	1
Opponent
P	W	D	L
Australia
1	0	0	1

Tour chronology
- ← Wales 1987 Japan 1990 →

The 1990 United States rugby union tour of Australia was a series of six matches played by the United States national rugby union team in Australia in June and July 1990. The United States team won three of their six matches, drew one and lost two, including the international match against the Australia national rugby union team.

== Matches ==
Scores and results list United States's points tally first.

Opposing Team	For	Against	Date	Venue	Match
Queensland B	13	13	June 27, 1990	Rockhampton	Tour match
New South Wales Country	19	6	July 1, 1990	Grenfell	Tour match
South Australia	16	12	July 4, 1990	Adelaide	Tour match
Australia	9	67	July 8, 1990	Ballymore, Brisbane	Test Match
Victoria	37	13	July 11, 1990	Melbourne	Tour match
Western Australia	23	33	July 15, 1990	Perth	Tour match
