= Scott Johnson (rugby union) =

Australian rugby union player

- Born: 19 August 1962 (age 64) Sydney, Australia
- Height: 1.80 m (5 ft 11 in)
- Weight: 79 kg (12 st 6 lb)

Rugby union career
- Position: Director of rugby
- Current team: Australian Rugby Union
- Correct as of 27 November 2014
Senior career
Years	Team	Apps	(Points)
- Parramatta Two Blues
–	Eastwood		
–	Toulon		
Provincial / State sides
Years	Team	Apps	(Points)
- NSW Waratahs
- Correct as of 29 December 2007
International career
Years	Team	Apps	(Points)
1973	Australia U21		
- Correct as of 27 November 2014
Coaching career
- Years: Team
- 1999: Penrith
- 2001: New South Wales (Assistant)
- 2001: Australia A
- 2002–2006: Wales (Assistant)
- 2006: Wales (Caretaker)
- 2007: Australia (Assistant)
- 2008–09: United States
- 2009–12: Ospreys
- 2012: Scotland (Assistant)
- 2012–14: Scotland (Interim Head Coach)
- 2014–19: Scotland (Director of Rugby)
- 2019–21: Australia (Director of Rugby)
- 2023: Rugby Canada
- Correct as of 27 November 2014

Scott Johnson (born 19 August 1962 in Sydney) is an Australian rugby union coach. He was the interim head coach for Scotland in 2013 and early 2014, then a director of rugby for Scotland between 2014 and 2019, before returning to Australia in the same role between 2019 and 2021.

== Playing career ==
Playing as a fly-half or a centre, Johnson played for Parramatta Two Blues and Eastwood, and was captain of both the New South Wales Waratahs and Australian Under 21s. Playing initially at fly half and then at centre, he played senior rugby for the New South Wales Waratahs. In the 1980s Johnson also played for French club Toulon in the French championship.

== Coaching career ==
Johnson started his coaching career with Penrith in the Sydney First Grade competition, and was named Club Coach of the Year in 1999. He then worked as an assistant coach at New South Wales Waratahs in 2001, as well as an assistant for the Australia A team who defeated the British and Irish Lions in Gosford.

Following an invitation from Graham Henry, Johnson left Australia to work with the then struggling Wales in the Six Nations Championship as Skills Coach. Working briefly under Henry and then for two years under Steve Hansen, Johnson was an integral member of the Welsh coaching staff during the 2003 Rugby World Cup. He remained with Wales when Hansen left in 2004 and was involved with Wales for their 2005 Grand Slam. Following the resignation of Mike Ruddock in 2006, Johnson took over as head coach on a temporary basis, ending his career with Wales in Cardiff after three games: a 31–5 defeat to Ireland in Dublin, an 18–18 draw against Italy in Cardiff, before going down to eventual Champions France 21–16.

In light of family pressures, he accepted an approach from new Wallabies head coach John Connolly to become Australia's attack coach in preparation for the 2007 Rugby World Cup.

Following a disastrous campaign and the reorganisation of the coaching staff, Johnson was released from this role following the 2007 World Cup and the signing of Robbie Deans as the new head coach of Australia. Johnson was linked with a move to the Cardiff Blues as skills coach, but decided not to accept this offer. His decision to say no to the Blues led to speculation linking him with the ambitious Ospreys. On 20 March 2008, the BBC reported that he had accepted the head coaching position for the US Eagles national team.

In January 2009, Johnson was linked with a move to coach the Ospreys. On 29 January, he was confirmed as the Ospreys' new director of coaching. He joined the team after he served a three-month notice period required by his US contract.

It was announced in December 2011 that Johnson would leave his post with the Ospreys at the end of his three-year contract. In June 2012, he joined Scottish coach Andy Robinson as his assistant coach through the 2012 Scottish tour of Oceania and the 2012 Autumn internationals. Robinson resigned his position after their 21–15 defeat to Tonga, which ended in the result of Scott Johnson being announced as head coach for Scotland. On 3 May 2013, Johnson was announced as director of rugby for Scotland Rugby, a post which had been vacant since Sir Ian McGeechan resigned in 2005, and would oversee all rugby in Scotland. However, he remained interim head coach for Scotland until a suitable head coach was found for the national side. Under Johnson's leadership, Scotland won two Six Nations games against Italy (one at home and one away), plus a win against Ireland.

On 15 March 2014, Johnson took charge of his final game (Wales v Scotland) making way for Vern Cotter's arrival as head coach. Johnson was named director of rugby for the Welsh Rugby Union.

=== International matches as head coach ===
Matches (2012–2014)
Matches	Date	Opposition	Venue	Score (sco.–opponent)	Competition	Captain
2013
1	2 February	England	Twickenham Stadium, London	18–38	Six Nations	Kelly Brown
2	9 February	Italy	Murrayfield Stadium, Edinburgh	34–10	Six Nations	Kelly Brown
3	24 February	Ireland	Murrayfield Stadium, Edinburgh	12–8	Six Nations	Kelly Brown
4	9 March	Wales	Murrayfield Stadium, Edinburgh	18–28	Six Nations	Kelly Brown
5	16 March	France	Stade de France, Paris	16–23	Six Nations	Kelly Brown
6	8 June	Samoa	Kings Park Stadium, Durban	17–27	South African Quadrangular Tournament	Kelly Brown
7	15 June	South Africa	Mbombela Stadium, Nelspruit	17–30	South African Quadrangular Tournament	Greig Laidlaw
8	22 June	Italy	Loftus Versfeld, Pretoria	30–29	South African Quadrangular Tournament	Greig Laidlaw
9	9 November	Japan	Murrayfield Stadium, Edinburgh	42–17	Autumn Internationals	Kelly Brown
10	16 November	South Africa	Murrayfield Stadium, Edinburgh	0–28	Autumn Internationals	Greig Laidlaw
11	23 November	Australia	Murrayfield Stadium, Edinburgh	15–21	Autumn Internationals	Kelly Brown
2014
12	2 February	Ireland	Aviva Stadium, Dublin	6–28	Six Nations	Kelly Brown
13	8 February	England	Murrayfield Stadium, Edinburgh	0–20	Six Nations	Greig Laidlaw
14	22 February	Italy	Stadio Olimpico, Rome	21–20	Six Nations	Greig Laidlaw
15	8 March	France	Murrayfield Stadium, Edinburgh	17–19	Six Nations	Kelly Brown
16	15 March	Wales	Millennium Stadium, Cardiff	3–51	Six Nations	Kelly Brown

=== Record by country ===
Opponent	Played	Won	Drew	Lost	Win ratio (%)	For	Against
Australia	1	0	0	1	0	15	21
England	2	0	0	2	0	18	58
France	2	0	0	2	0	33	42
Ireland	2	1	0	1	50	18	36
Italy	3	3	0	0	100	85	59
Japan	1	1	0	0	100	42	17
Samoa	1	0	0	1	0	17	27
South Africa	2	0	0	2	0	17	58
Wales	2	0	0	2	0	21	79
TOTAL	16	5	0	11	31	266	397

Sporting positions
Preceded by (Wales) Mike Ruddock	Wales National Rugby Union Coach (caretaker); 2006	Succeeded by (Wales) Gareth Jenkins
Preceded by (New Zealand) Peter Thorburn	United States National Rugby Union Coach; 2008–09	Succeeded by (Republic of Ireland) Eddie O'Sullivan
Preceded by (England) Andy Robinson	Scotland National Rugby Union Coach (interim); 2013–14	Succeeded by (New Zealand) Vern Cotter
