= Scott Lawrence (rugby union) =

American rugby union coach

Scott Lawerence
- Born: October 8, 1975 (age 51)
- Height: 1.88 m (6 ft 2 in)
- Weight: 230 lb (100 kg)

Rugby union career
- Position: Flanker
Senior career
Years	Team	Apps	(Points)
2000–2001	Halifax RUFC (UK)	14	(20)
2002–2003	Grand Rapids		
2004–2006	Life University		
- Correct as of 29 April 2024
International career
Years	Team	Apps	(Points)
2002–2003	USA 'A'		
2006	United States	5	(0)
- Correct as of 19 February 2021
National sevens team
Years	Team		Comps
- USA 7
Coaching career
- Years: Team
- 2004–2017: Life University
- 2011–2012: United States U20
- 2015: United States U20
- 2017–2018: USA Select XV
- 2017–2018: United States (defence coach)
- 2019–2022: Rugby ATL
- 2022: United States (defence coach)
- 2023: United States (interim coach)
- 2024: United States
- Correct as of 29 April 2024

Scott Lawrence (born October 8, 1975) is an American rugby union coach and former player who played as a flanker.

He currently serves as the head coach for the national mens team of the United States. He previously coached Rugby ATL in Major League Rugby (MLR) from 2020 to 2022.

== Playing career ==
Lawrence played his club rugby with Grand Rapids in Michigan in lower divisions of USA Rugby. It was at Grand Rapids that provided Lawrence the platform to represent his country.

In 2002, he entered as a substitute for the USA 'A' squad against Scotland in a non-capped match, and later again was called up to the A squad in 2003.

In June 2003, he was named in a 49-man preliminary squad for the 2003 Rugby World Cup, but failed to make the final squad that traveled to Australia.

In 2004, Lawrence joined up with Life University, who he played for and coached at. It was whilst at Life University Lawrence gained his first official International cap, after being selected for the 2006 Churchill Cup. Whilst he didn't play the first two matches, he later received his first cap in the team's final match against Canada. He played five matches for the U.S. national team in 2006 as a loose forward, starting three games.

After retiring from rugby in 2006, Lawrence transitioned to coaching remaining at Life University.

== Coaching career ==
After his playing days, Lawrence transitioned into coaching, taking the helm of Life University's men's rugby team. Under his leadership, the program achieved significant success, winning various titles in the D1A National Championship.

Lawrence's tenure at Life University not only brought accolades to the institution but also helped in nurturing and developing talent (players & coaches) that would go on to represent the USA on international stages.

In 2011, Lawrence coached the United States U20 national team at the 2011 and 2012 Junior World Rugby Trophy, leading the team to victory in the 2012 tournament.

In May 2017, Lawrence left Life University and returned to USA Rugby, becoming defence coach of the national team. By July, he had helped secure qualification for the 2019 Rugby World Cup and in 2018, he was part of the coaching team that saw the United States retain the Americas Rugby Championship title.

Along side his duties as the national defence coach, he also became head coach of the USA Selects for the 2017 and 2018 World Rugby Americas Pacific Challenge.

His coaching journey continued in 2019, becoming the inaugural head coach of Rugby ATL in the Major League Rugby competition ahead of the 2020 season. However, the season was cut short due to the COVID-19 pandemic. In 2021, Rugby ATL topped the Eastern Conference before going onto finish as runners-up to LA Giltinis in final.

In January 2022, Lawrence unexpectedly resigned from his position at Rugby ATL two weeks short of the start of the 2022 season. Whilst the reason for stepping down were not explained, Lawrence later rejoined the national team set-up, taking back up the position of defence coach.

After filing to qualify for the 2023 Rugby World Cup, the then head coach Gary Gold resigned as head coach, prompting USA Rugby to appoint Lawrence as interim Head Coach for 2023.

Lawrence's first match in charge was a 31–17 victory over Romania as part of The Oaks preparations for the 2023 Rugby World Cup, before going onto lose to Georgia and Portugal. More notably, he led his side to a 24–21 victory over French Top 14 side Toulouse, before going onto secure the La Vila International Rugby Cup in November with wins over Spain and Brazil.

In January 2024, Scott Lawrence was officially appointed Head Coach of the USA Men’s Eagles and General Manager of the USA Men’s XVs programs.

During the 2024 season, Lawrence led his side to fourth place in the 2024 World Rugby Pacific Nations Cup, and an unbeaten autumn European tour for the first time since 2013; with wins over Portugal, Tonga (their first over the nation since 1999), and Spain.

Sporting positions
Preceded by (South Africa) Gary Gold	USA national rugby union coach 2023–Present	Succeeded by Incumbent
