= Tom Billups =

American rugby union player (born 1964)

- Born: Thomas Wayne Billups; December 26, 1964 (age 61) Burlington, Iowa, United States
- Height: 5 ft 8 in (1.73 m)
- Weight: 210 lb (95 kg; 15 st 0 lb)
- University: Augustana College
- Occupation: Coach

Rugby union career
- Position: Hooker
Amateur team(s)
Years	Team	Apps	(Points)
- Old Blues of California
Senior career
Years	Team	Apps	(Points)
1996–1997	Blackheath F.C.		
1997–1998	Harlequin F.C.	15	(0)
1998–1999	Neath RFC		
1999–2000	Pontypridd RFC	18	
International career
Years	Team	Apps	(Points)
1993–1999	United States	44	(10)
- Correct as of 1 January 2021
Coaching career
- Years: Team
- 2001–2006: United States

Tom Billups (born December 26, 1964) is an American former rugby union rugby player (hooker position), who played for the USA Eagles as an international and Blackheath Rugby Club, Harlequin F.C., and Pontypridd RFC as a professional. After retiring as a player in 1999, he joined the staff of the United States national team and was the head coach from 2001 to 2006. In addition to coaching the Eagles, Billups managed the U.S. national sevens team program and coached the 2005 U.S. sevens team. In 2015 Billups was inducted into U.S. Rugby Hall of Fame, and was the first person to be inducted as both a player and coach. In 2018 Billups became the 14th recipient of the Craig Sweeney Award which was first award in 1979 in memory of former United States national team member and captain, Craig Sweeney. The Sweeney Award is presented to a former national team player who has contributed significantly to the game while displaying exemplary character on and off the field.

Billups also coached the Collegiate All-American Team and the United States Marine Corps. Billups currently serves as associate head coach for the varsity rugby program at the University of California, Berkeley, after joining the staff in 2000.

== Playing career ==
=== College ===
Tom Billups began his rugby career in 1984 with the Quad City Irish, a rugby union club in Davenport, Iowa, while an undergraduate student at Augustana College in Rock Island, Illinois. In 1985, Billups in part led the QC Irish to the 7's national championship. Starting out as an offensive lineman for the Augustana football team, Tom played football in the Fall, wrestled in the Winter and played rugby for the Quad City Irish in the Spring. Billups was a four-year letter winner during the Viking's run of four consecutive national championships for football and ended his collegiate football career 49-0-1. He was awarded the Jerry Fleck Award as the most inspirational player his senior year. Billups attended Augustana College from 1983 to 1987 and graduated with a B.A. in Psychology. Tom Billups is also a member of the Augustana College Athletics Hall of Fame through his participation in four consecutive NCAA Division III national football championships.

=== Professional ===
In 1990, Billups played a season in New Zealand's Bay of Plenty before moving back to the States. He relocated to the San Francisco Bay Area in 1991 to play for and captain the Berkeley Old Blues, which won the national championship in 1992.

After the professionalization of the game in the mid-1990s, Billups was one of the first American rugby players to sign a professional contract in 1996. He started his professional career playing for the Blackheath Rugby Club in London from August 1996 to February 1997. Billups then played for the Harlequins from 1997 to 1999 and was the Supporter's Club Player of the Year during the 1997-1998 season. In 1999, Billups finished his professional playing career in Wales playing first for Neath RFC and then with Pontypridd RFC.

=== International ===
Tom Billups played and captained the United States national rugby sevens team from 1989 until 1993. He first represented the U.S. at the 1989 Hong Kong Sevens tournament.

Billups earned his first international test cap in June 1993, when the U.S. played Canada. During his international career from 1993 to 1999, he won 44 caps, with 12 of those as captain. Billups represented the United States at the 1999 Rugby World Cup, where he played his last game of rugby against Australia and officially retired. Billups is the most capped hooker in USA Rugby history.

== Coaching career ==
=== United States national team ===
Tom Billups served as the assistant coach of the United States national team during the 2000 season, the 2001 Pan-American Championship and England's June 2001 tour of the United States. Later in 2001, Billups accepted the interim head coaching position for a test against South Africa and was named the Eagles' full-time head coach at the start of 2002. In 2003, he posted a 7-6 mark, an American record for single-season wins, including four straight victories at the time. At the 2003 Rugby World Cup, Billups steered the Eagles to their first World Cup victory since 1987 against Japan, as well as an admirable one-point loss against Fiji (19-18). The USA's second-place finish at the Pan -American Championship in August 2003 was its best-ever showing. In 2004, Billups coached the team to two three-point defeats to Canada and a 39-31 loss to France in July, which is America's best-ever showing against the Tricolors. Tom Billups finished up his tenure with USA Rugby in April 2006 with 12 wins, including the second largest US national team victory (35-20) at the time over rival Canada in 2003.

OPPONENT	DATE	SCORE	W/L
South Africa	12/1/2001	43-20	L
Scotland	6/22/2002	65-23	L
Canada	6/29/2002	29-6	L
Canada	7/13/2002	36-13	L
Chile	8/10/2002	35-22	W
Uruguay	8/15/2002	28-24	W
Chile	8/24/2002	21-13	L
Uruguay	8/31/2002	10-9	L
Spain	4/12/2003	62-13	W
Spain	4/27/2003	58-13	W
Japan	5/17/2003	69-27	W
Canada	6/18/2003	16-11	W
England	6/21/2003	36-10	L
England	6/28/2003	43-6	L
Argentina	8/23/2003	42-8	L
Canada	8/27/2003	35-20	W
Uruguay	8/30/2003	31-17	W
Fiji	10/15/2003	19-18	L
Scotland	10/20/2003	39-15	L
Japan	10/27/2003	39-26	W
France	10/31/2003	41-14	L
Canada	5/27/2004	23-20	L
Russia	5/30/2004	41-11	W
New Zealand Maori	6/12/2004	69-31	L
Canada	6/19/2004	32-29	L
France	7/3/2004	39-31	L
Ireland	11/20/2004	55-6	L
Italy	11/27/2004	43-25	L
Canada	5/25/2005	30-26	L
Romania	5/29/2005	28-22	W
Wales	6/4/2005	77-3	L
Argentina	6/19/2005	30-34	L
Canada	6/26/2005	20-19	W

=== United States sevens national team ===
Tom Billups directed the United States 7s National Team program from 2001 to 2006. In 2005, he served as the head coach of the team for the World Games in Germany.

=== College ===
Billups was the head coach of USA Rugby's Collegiate All-American Team in 2001 and guided the team to a 2-0 tour of Ireland. From that team came several international players, such as Captain Kort Schubert, Matt Sherman, Kimball Kjar, Mike MacDonald and Paul Emerick.

Billups coached the US Marine Corps to the championship match in 2006, and continued to coach the team throughout 2007.

Billups joined the rugby coaching staff at the University of California, Berkeley in 2000. A certified strength and conditioning specialist, Billups has been in charge of the team's strength and conditioning since 2003. In 2013, Cal Rugby was crowned champions on NBC Sports, winning the sevens Collegiate Rugby Championship (CRC) in Philadelphia. This marked the first sevens championship for the Golden Bears, who have gone on to win five consecutive national titles. Since 2000, Cal Rugby has won 12 National Championships in 15s in addition to the 5 sevens crowns.

== Notes ==
Sporting positions
Preceded by (Australia) Duncan Hall	United States National Rugby Union Coach; 2001-2006	Succeeded by (New Zealand) Peter Thorburn
