= Dennis Storer =

American rugby and soccer coach (1932–2007)

- Born: Dennis Storer; April 6, 1932
- Died: September 8, 2007 (aged 75)
- Occupation(s): Rugby union coach, soccer coach

Rugby union career
- Position: Center
Amateur team(s)
Years	Team	Apps	(Points)
–	Bleackheath		
–	Leicester		
Coaching career
- Years: Team
- 1966–1982: UCLA Bruins rugby team
- 1976–1982: U.S. national rugby team

Dennis Storer (April 6, 1932 – September 8, 2007) was an American rugby and soccer coach, best known for being the head coach of the United States national rugby union team in 1976. Storer helped restart the United States men's national rugby union team in 1976, and was head coach of the team for 13 matches from 1976 until 1982. Storer coached the UCLA Bruins men's rugby team from 1966 to 1982, earning a record of 362 wins, 46 losses, and 2 draws, and winning national championships in 1968, 1972, and 1975.

Storer also had success as a soccer coach. Storer was the first head coach of the UCLA Bruins men's soccer team when that program was elevated from club status to a varsity program, and coached the program from 1967 to 1973, compiling a record of 103 wins, 10 draws, and 10 losses.

Storer was inducted into the UCLA Athletics Hall of Fame in 2006. Storer was one of the six original inductees into the U.S. Rugby Hall of Fame in 2011.
