= 1997 United States rugby union tour of Wales =

- Manager: M DeJong
- Tour captain: Dan Lyle
Summary
P	W	D	L
Total
3	1	0	2
Test match
1	0	0	1
Opponent
P	W	D	L
Wales
1	0	0	1

Tour chronology
- ← Ireland 1994 Portugal and Spain 1998 →

The 1997 United States rugby union tour of Wales was a series of rugby union matches played during January 1997 in Wales by the USA national rugby union team.

== Results ==
Scores and results list USA's points tally first.

Opposing Team	For	Against	Date	Venue	Status
Emerging Wales		Cancelled	1 January 1997	Cardiff Arms Park, Cardiff	Tour match
Neath RFC	15	39	4 January 1997	Cardiff Arms Park	Tour match
Pontypridd RFC	15	13	7 January 1997	Cardiff Arms Park	Tour match
Wales	14	34	11 January 1997	Cardiff Arms Park	Test Match
