= Jim Perkins (rugby union coach) =

- Born: James G. Perkins England
- University: University of Chicago
- Occupation: COO of Propcopio

Rugby union career
Coaching career
- Years: Team
- 198?-1987: OMBAC
- 1987-1994: United States

James G. Perkins is a former English rugby union coach and currently, Chief Operating Officer at Procopio, Cory, Hargreaves & Savitch LLP, as well as director of the United States Rugby Football Union.

== Career ==
After moving from England to the United States, Jim Perkins played rugby in the Chicago Lions. When his playing days were over, Perkins began a long coaching career, coaching the Midwest All-Stars before coaching the United States National Rugby Team. Perkins retired from coaching after taking the Eagles to the 1991 Rugby World Cup. He is currently COO of Procopio, Cory, Hargreaves & Savitch, LLP, in San Diego.
