= Wales A national rugby union team =

Wales A
- Union: Welsh Rugby Union
- Emblem: the Prince of Wales's feathers
- Ground: Various
1st kit	2nd kit

The Wales A team were the second national rugby union team behind the Welsh national side. They have not played a game since April 2002.

On 20 February 2003, the Welsh Rugby Union were given permission to withdraw from the "A" team Six Nations Championship, citing costs as the primary reason. In September 2007 it was reported that the union turned down an offer to enter a "Wales A" side into the 2008 Churchill Cup competition. In August 2011, an agreement was reached between the Welsh Rugby Union and the Welsh Rugby Players Association which expressed a desire to bring back the side with match funding being assured. In August 2014 it was announced that the Wales A team would return to playing from January 2015 onwards, however, no matches were scheduled and the team ultimately did not reform.

Prior to their current period of inactivity, their last coach was Mike Ruddock for the 2002 Six Nations "A" tournament, and included notable Wales internationals such as Tom Shanklin and Shane Williams.

The side also has a history of playing matches against touring Southern Hemisphere sides, the last being a 34–15 defeat to South Africa in 2000.

== Record ==
Below is a table of the representative rugby matches played by Wales A up until 5 April 2002, updated after match with Scotland A.

Opponent	Played	Won	Lost	Drawn	% Won
Argentina XV	3	0	3	0	0%
Australia A	2	0	2	0	0%
Canada	2	2	0	0	100%
Canada A	3	3	0	0	100%
England A	5	3	1	1	60%
Fiji	1	1	0	0	100%
Fiji Warriors	1	0	1	0	0%
France A	24	12	12	0	50%
Ireland XV	9	5	4	0	55.56%
Italy A	3	3	0	0	100%
Japan XV	1	1	0	0	100%
Netherlands	2	2	0	0	100%
New Zealand XV	2	0	2	0	0%
Romania	1	1	0	0	100%
Romania A	2	2	0	0	100%
Scotland A	7	3	4	0	42.86%
South Africa A	3	0	3	0	0%
Spain	1	1	0	0	100%
Tonga A	1	1	0	0	100%
United States	1	1	0	0	100%
United States XV	1	1	0	0	100%
Uruguay	1	1	0	0	100%
Total	76	43	32	1	56.58%
