= Ron Mayes =

American rugby union coach

- Born: Ron Mayes; 1946 (age 79–80) New Zealand
- University: University of Auckland
- Occupation(s): Rugby union coach and player

Rugby union career
Senior career
Years	Team	Apps	(Points)
1976-1982	Northern California Pelicans		
1978-1982	Pacific Coast Grizzlies		
Coaching career
- Years: Team
- 1974-1983: Old Blues Rugby Club
- 1983-1987: U.S. national rugby team

Ron Mayes (born 1946) is a New Zealand former rugby union player and coach, best known for coaching the United States national rugby union team from 1983 to 1987.

== Early life and career ==
Mayes was born in New Zealand in 1946. He was capped in New Zealand's first division team until his early retirement and transition into coaching due to an injury at the age of 22. He came to the United States in 1972.

Mayes became the head coach of the Old Blues Rugby Club in 1974 and won five National Club Championships. He left the club in 1983 to sign on as the head coach of the United States national rugby union team, a position that he held through the first Rugby World Cup in 1987.

Mayes had previously served as the head coach of the Northern California Pelicans from 1976 to 1982 and the Pacific Coast Grizzlies from 1978 to 1982.

== Education ==
Mayes received his Ph.D. in Structural Engineering from the University of Auckland, New Zealand, in 1972 and performed post-doctoral research on a Fulbright Scholarship at the Earthquake Engineering Research Institute in Oakland, California.

Mayes serves as a Fellow of the Structural Engineers Association of Northern California (SEAONC) and the statewide Structural Engineers Association of California (SEAOC).

== Awards ==
Mayes was inducted into the U.S. Rugby Hall of Fame in 2014.
