= Jack Clark (rugby union) =

US international rugby union player

- Born: United States
- Height: 6 ft 5 in (1.96 m)
- Weight: 250 lb (110 kg)

Rugby union career
- Position: Lock
International career
Years	Team	Apps	(Points)
1979–1980	United States	2	(0)
Coaching career
- Years: Team
- 1993–1999: United States
- 1984–present: California Golden Bears

Jack Clark is an American former rugby union player, former head coach of the U.S. national rugby team, and the current head rugby coach at the University of California at Berkeley, where he became the sixth head coach in team history in 1984.

== Playing career ==
A sixth-generation Californian raised in Huntington Beach, Clark was a standout football and basketball star at Edison High School, winning the school's Most Inspirational Athlete award. He was an All-America Junior College offensive tackle at Orange Coast Junior College before transferring to the University of California as a junior and earning varsity letters in football (1976–77) and rugby (1977). After Cal he signed a professional gridiron football contract with the Philadelphia Eagles of the National Football League and later signed with the Winnipeg Blue Bombers of the Canadian Football League before continuing his rugby career. Clark was named the Most Valuable Player of the 1979 Inter-Territorial Tournament/National Team Trials and was selected to the national team, earning full caps in 1979 and 1980 against Canada. In 1980, Clark was selected to the Overseas XV and started against Wales in Cardiff Arms Park.

== Cal head coach ==
Jack Clark has served as the University of California's varsity rugby head coach since 1984 (assistant coach 1982–1983), compiling an overall Cal record of 758–96–5 (.882), a career that includes both 15s and 7s, and has yielded 23 National Collegiate Championships in 15s, including 12 in a row from 1991–2002 and five straight from 2004–2008, and five national titles in 7s at the 2013 through 2017 Collegiate Rugby Championships.

In 2006 and 2009 Clark's Cal student-athletes defeated the USA Super League Champions, New York Athletic Club (NYAC).

Clark's Golden Bear rugby program has produced 135 All-Americans, 47 U.S. international 15s players and one Olympian in 2016 Team USA Rugby 7s player Danny Barrett.

The Bears' era of success under Clark has also included a combined record of 36–1 against rugby powerhouses Army, Navy and Air Force; 14 of the last 18 vs. University of British Columbia; a domestic winning streak of 98 games from 1990–96 and a 70-game tear that lasted until 2003; a winning streak over U.S. collegiate competition that lasted 115 matches between April 2004 and May 2009; and a winning streak in 15s of 63 straight matches from 2010 through Feb. 18, 2012.

== Head coach of U.S. national team ==
Clark's 16 test victories with the United States national team are the most among head coaches in team history. His teams also maintained a margin of defeat of a converted try or less on 14 occasions. The Eagles' best performances under Clark may have come in defeats against teams ranked significantly higher than the U.S., including 26–22 vs. Australia, 25–18 vs. Ireland, 28–23 vs. Wales, and three losses to Argentina by a total of 14 points, the closest of which was a 29–26 result. However, the team also suffered their heaviest defeat in their history during his tenure, being beaten 106-8 by England in 1999. During Clark's tenure as head coach and general manager of the U.S. National Team, he was the first to offer national team players full primary-care insurance and compensation contracts which covered retainers, daily fees and performance bonuses.

=== At Rugby World Cups ===
Jack Clark was hired at the head coach for the USA 15 months before qualification for the 1995 RWC. His Eagles defeated North American zone qualifier Bermuda 60–3 in Hamilton, Bermuda, to set up a home-and-away with South America champion Argentina. The U.S. lost those two matches, 22–28 in Long Beach, Calif., and 11–16 in Buenos Aires. The USA qualified for the 1999 RWC under Clark with a 21–16 victory over Uruguay in a Buenos Aires qualifying tournament that also featured Argentina and Canada. In the 1999 Pacific Rim Tournament, used as a lead-up to the RWC, Clark's Eagles defeated Tonga 30–10, Fiji 25–14 and Canada 18–17 before losing a tight decision to Samoa, 20–27, in Apia. The USA was assigned to Pool E of the 1999 RWC in Ireland, where the Eagles were defeated by the hosts 8–53 in their opening game before losing a 25–27 heartbreaker to Romania. In the team's final RWC match of that year, the Eagles lost to eventual champion Australia, 55–19, with the U.S. registering four Kevin Dalzell penalties and scoring the only try yielded by the Wallabies in the entire tournament.

=== International coaching record ===
Opponent	Date M/D/YR	Score	W/L
Canada	6/19/93	9–20	L
Australia	10/2/93	22–26	L
Bermuda	3/12/94	60–3	W
Canada	5/21/94	10–15	L
Argentina	5/28/94	22–28	L
Argentina	6/20/94	11–16	L
Ireland	11/5/94	15–26	L
Canada	9/9/95	15–14	W
Ireland	1/9/96	18–25	L
Canada	5/11/96	19–12	W
Canada	5/18/96	20–24	L
Hong Kong	6/9/96	19–22	L
Japan	6/16/96	18–24	L
Hong Kong	6/29/96	42–23	W
Japan	7/6/96	74–5	W
Argentina	9/14/96	26–29	L
Canada	9/19/96	18–23	L
Uruguay	9/21/96	27–13	W
Wales	1/11/97	14–34	L
Canada	5/10/97	12–53	L
Hong Kong	5/18/97	9–46	L
Japan	5/24/97	20–12	W
Japan	6/7/97	51–29	W
Hong Kong	6/14/97	17–14	W
Canada	6/28/97	11–22	L
Wales	7/5/97	20–30	L
Wales	7/12/97	23–28	L
Portugal	4/8/98	61–5	W
Spain	4/12/98	49–3	W
Japan	5/10/98	38–27	W
Hong Kong	5/16/98	25–43	L
Canada	5/23/98	15–17	L
Canada	6/6/98	3–37	L
Japan	6/13/98	21–25	L
Hong Kong	6/20/98	17–27	L
Fiji	7/25/98	9–18	L
Argentina	8/16/98	24–52	L
Canada	8/19/98	14–31	L
Uruguay	8/23/98	21–16	W
Tonga	5/8/99	30–10	W
Fiji	5/22/99	25–14	W
Japan	6/12/99	31–47	L
Canada	6/19/99	18–17	W
Samoa	6/26/99	20–27	L
England	8/22/99	8–106	L
Ireland	10/2/99	8–53	L
Romania	10/9/99	25–27	L
Australia	10/14/99	19–55	L
TOTAL	W/L: 16–32		

== Other contributions to U.S. National Team ==
General Manager: Following his term as head coach, Clark served as General Manager from 200(?)–2003, during which time the National 15s Team won 12 international test matches. In this role, Clark represented USA Rugby in the founding of the Pacific Rim and Super Cup International test competitions.

Business Development Director: In his role as Business Development Director for USA Rugby from 1993–2003, Clark originated sponsorship agreements with Chevron, Reebok, American President Lines, Rugby Rugby, British Sky Broadcasting, Nike, adidas, Welsh Development Agency, PowerBar, Liberty Sports, Fox Sports, Hawaii Tourism Authority, Rugby Football Union, AT&T, Lands’ End, Palo Alto Medical Foundation and Anheuser Busch.

== Other coaching ==
Clark also served as head coach for the Collegiate All-American team from 1985–92 and was its general manager from 2000–2003. Appointed head coach of the All-Marine rugby team in 2006-2007, Clark led the Marines to the Silver Medal at the Armed Forces Rugby Championship at Marine Corps Base Camp Lejeune, N.C.

== Other honors ==
Clark delivered the keynote address at the International Rugby Board's Conference on the Game 1998. In 2000, he was chosen one of Cal's Ten Most Influential Sports Figures of the 20th Century by The Daily Californian, joining legendary Cal Hall of Fame coaches Carrol "Ky" Ebright, Brutus Hamilton, Pete Newell and Lynn "Pappy" Waldorf on the honor roll.

In 2001, Clark was the recipient of the Craig Sweeney Award, which is bestowed to former U.S. internationals for their "significant contribution to the game." On June 7, 2014, in Houston, Clark was inducted into the U.S. Rugby Hall of Fame.

In 2016 he was enshrined into the Cal Athletic Hall of Fame. Clark is also the 2016 recipient of The Glenn T. Seaborg Award, named after the former University chancellor and Nobel Prize winner. A past chairman of the Cal Head Coaches Advisory Board, Clark has also received National Coach of the Year awards and numerous Cal Coach of the Year awards. Clark is a frequent guest lecturer and presenter in academia, the corporate world and sports community on his expertise, "The Values of High-Performance Teams."

== As corporate consultant/speaker ==
Clark is a frequent guest lecturer in academia. He regularly presents in the School of Business’ Organizational Behavior curriculum. He is a sought-after presenter and consultant to corporate America on his expertise in team and culture building. Clark's work with corporations spans many industries, including bio tech, gaming, information technology, apparel/footwear manufacturing, legal, financial services, telecommunications, real estate and venture capital. His client list includes companies such as AT&T, Bessemer Venture Partners, Genentech, Goldman Sachs, Kabam, Oracle, and Orrick, Herrington & Sutcliffe.
