= List of United States national rugby union players =

List of United States national rugby union players is a list of people who have played for the United States national rugby union team. The list only includes players who have played in a match recognized by USA Rugby as a test match, whether it was played before or after the governing body was founded in 1975. (In rugby union, any match of a nation's senior side recognized as a Test by its national governing body is included in test statistics for that nation.) Players that were first capped during the same match are listed in order of those that began in the starting line up before replacements and then in alphabetical order by surname. Note that the "position" column lists the position at which the player made his Test debut, not necessarily the position for which he is best known. (For example, Mike Te'o made his debut for the Eagles at scrum-half, but has made the majority of his appearances representing the United States at either full-back or wing.) A position in parentheses indicates that the player debuted as a substitute.

Members of the national rugby union team who have been inducted into the World Rugby Hall of Fame include the players from the Gold medal-winning teams from the 1920 and 1924 Olympic Games (inducted in 2012) and Dan Carroll, player-coach of the 1920 Olympic team (inducted in his own right in 2016).

== Early years ==
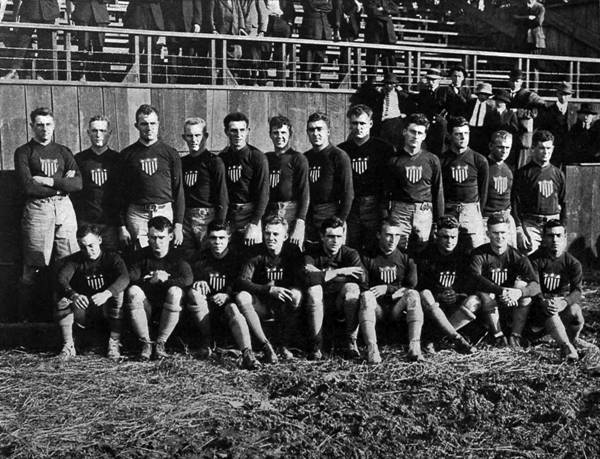
The All America team that played against Australia in 1912

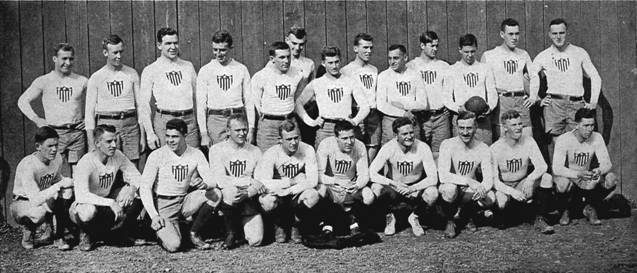
The United States team that played against New Zealand in 1913

Although the United States of America Rugby Football Union (now known as USA Rugby) was not formally established until 1975, USA Rugby has recognized six matches played before that time as international matches with caps awarded. Then referred to as All America, a team composed of California collegiate rugby players first toured Australia in 1910, competing in twenty matches against multiple state-representative sides and the then recently formed New Zealand Māori. This team played respectably, and although they lost the majority of their matches, they secured a draw against the Ranfurly Shield-holding Auckland rugby union team. The California Rugby Union organizers of the tour invited a joint Australasian team to come to California for a tour, but separate tours from the Australian and New Zealand teams were arranged instead. These tours, in 1912 and 1913 respectively, resulted in the first matches recognized as international tests. Each match resulted in a defeat for the Americans. Laird "Monte" Morris served as captain for the match in 1912. Deke Gard, veteran of the 1912 team, captained the team in 1913.

After the All Blacks tour, amid a time where prominent California colleges and universities were transitioning back to playing American football from rugby union, no further matches were held. However, after organizing a team for a successful tour of British Columbia in early 1920, the California Rugby Union successfully petitioned the United States Olympic Committee (USOC) to enter a team at the 1920 Summer Olympics in Antwerp, Belgium. The USOC declined to provide any funding for this team; in June 1920, the Amateur Athletic Union agreed to pay for the team's expenses. After each of the home nations declined to send a team to the Games on account of scheduling conflicts with their domestic competitions, and the teams from Romania and Czechoslovakia withdrew from the Games on short notice, the Olympic rugby union competition was reduced to a single match between the United States and France. After a scoreless first half, the United States won this match by a score of 8–0. Following the Olympics, the French Rugby Union invited the American team to tour France. Sixteen members of the team that competed in the Olympics traveled to France and played three uncapped matches against regional opposition from the southeast, south, and southwest of France; each resulted in a victory for the Americans. A final match against the France national team was held on October 10, 1920 in Paris, resulting in a 14–5 defeat for the Americans. Upon returning to the United States, the team was disbanded. Charles Tilden served as team captain during the 1920 Olympics and the tour of France that followed. Daniel Carroll, veteran of the 1913 team, served as player-coach in 1920; he was inducted into the World Rugby Hall of Fame in 2016.

In September 1923, the Americans received an invitation from the French Olympic Committee to defend their Olympic title at the 1924 Summer Olympics in Paris. As in 1920, the newly re-formed team was required to provide for its own funding, as the USOC declined to provide any. This time, however, the Olympic competition expanded to a three-team round-robin tournament with the United States, France, and Romania competing. Both the United States and France defeated Romania by wide margins in the first two matches of the tournament, leaving the two teams to contest for the gold medal in the final match. On May 18, 1924, before a hostile crowd of approximately 35,000 people, the Americans defeated France by a 17–3 score. Following the Games, rugby was subsequently removed from the Olympic program, and the two-time Olympic champions returned home to little fanfare. Colby "Babe" Slater was the team captain during the 1924 Olympics. Charles Doe, who acted as captain in Slater's absence in the Olympic match against Romania, was the team's vice-captain. Charles Austin, himself a veteran of team in 1912 and 1913, coached the team in 1924. All of the players from the Gold medal-winning teams in 1920 and 1924 were inducted into the World Rugby Hall of Fame in 2012.

== 1970s–present ==
USA Rugby was formally organized in June 1975 and fielded its first men's national team on January 31, 1976 in a test match against Australia—a 24–12 defeat. Robbie Bordley served as team captain in this first match, and in the team's first modern-era test match against France on June 12, 1976.

== Historic-era ==
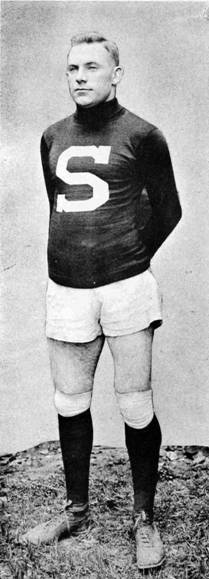
Dan Carroll made three test appearances for the United States from 1913–1920 and was inducted into the World Rugby Hall of Fame in 2016.

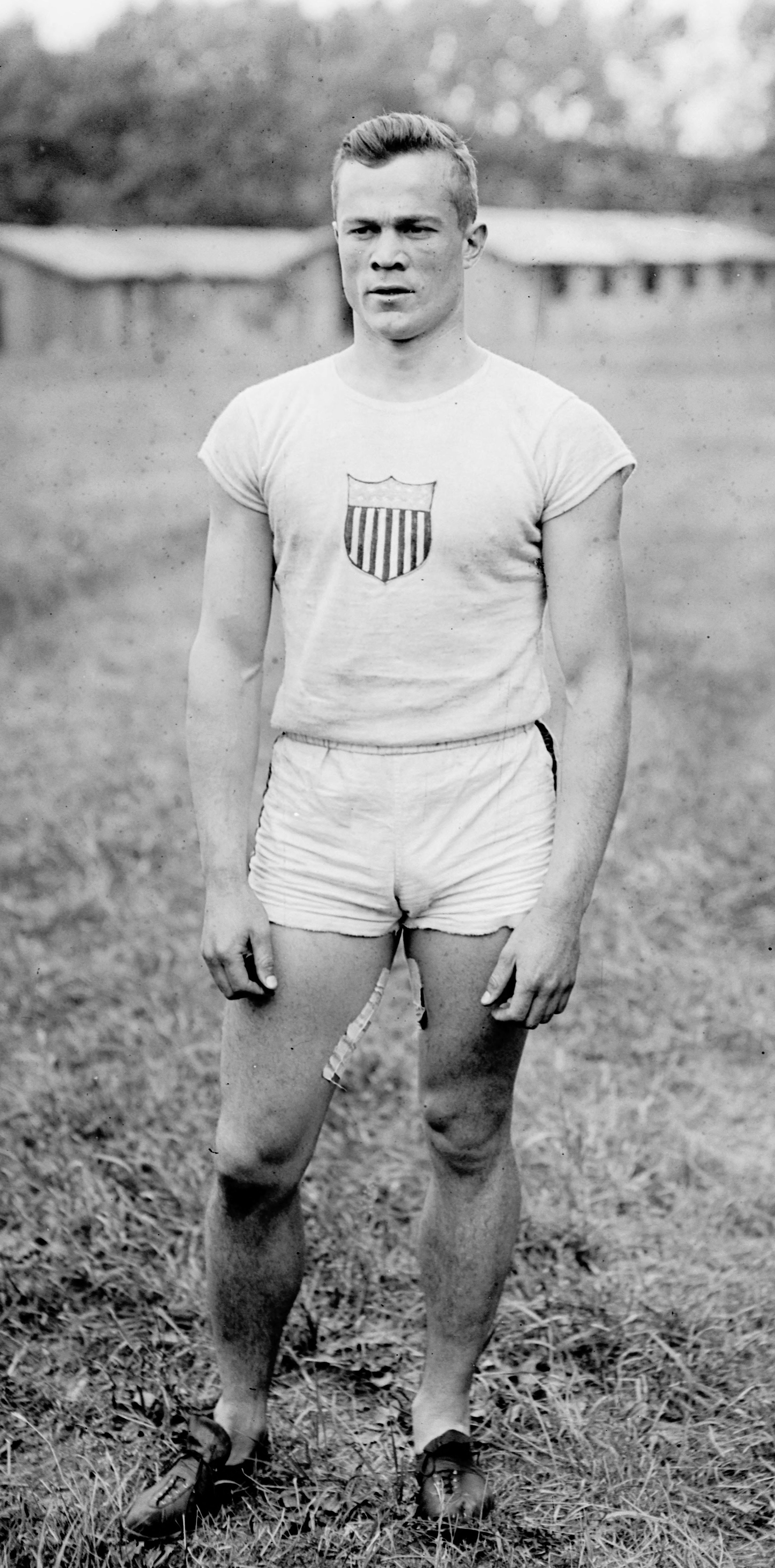
Morris Kirksey returned home from the 1920 Summer Olympics with three medals: gold in the 4 × 100 meter relay and silver in the 100 meter dash, in addition to his gold medal from the rugby competition.

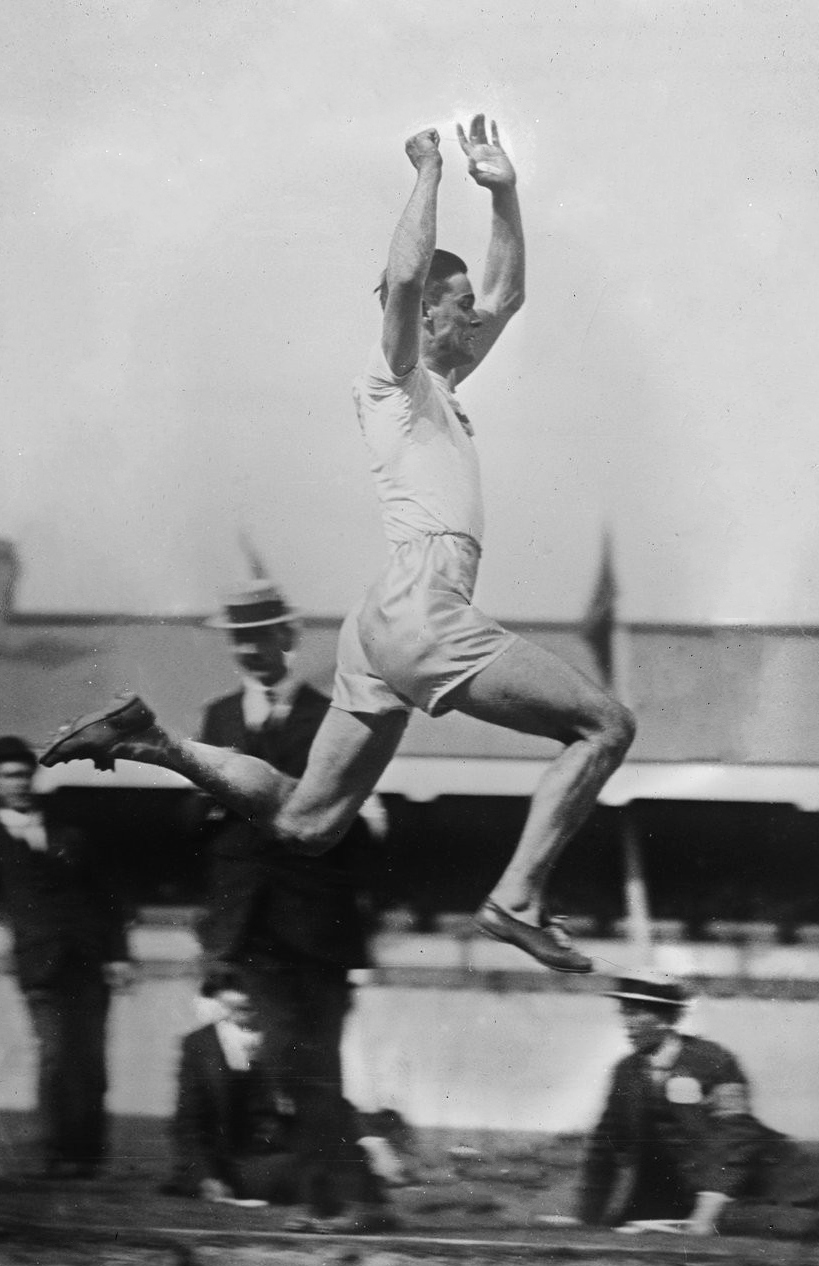
In addition to scoring the majority of the Americans' points at the 1920 Olympics, Robert "Dink" Templeton earned a 4th place finish in the men's long jump for the United States national track and field team at the same Olympic games.

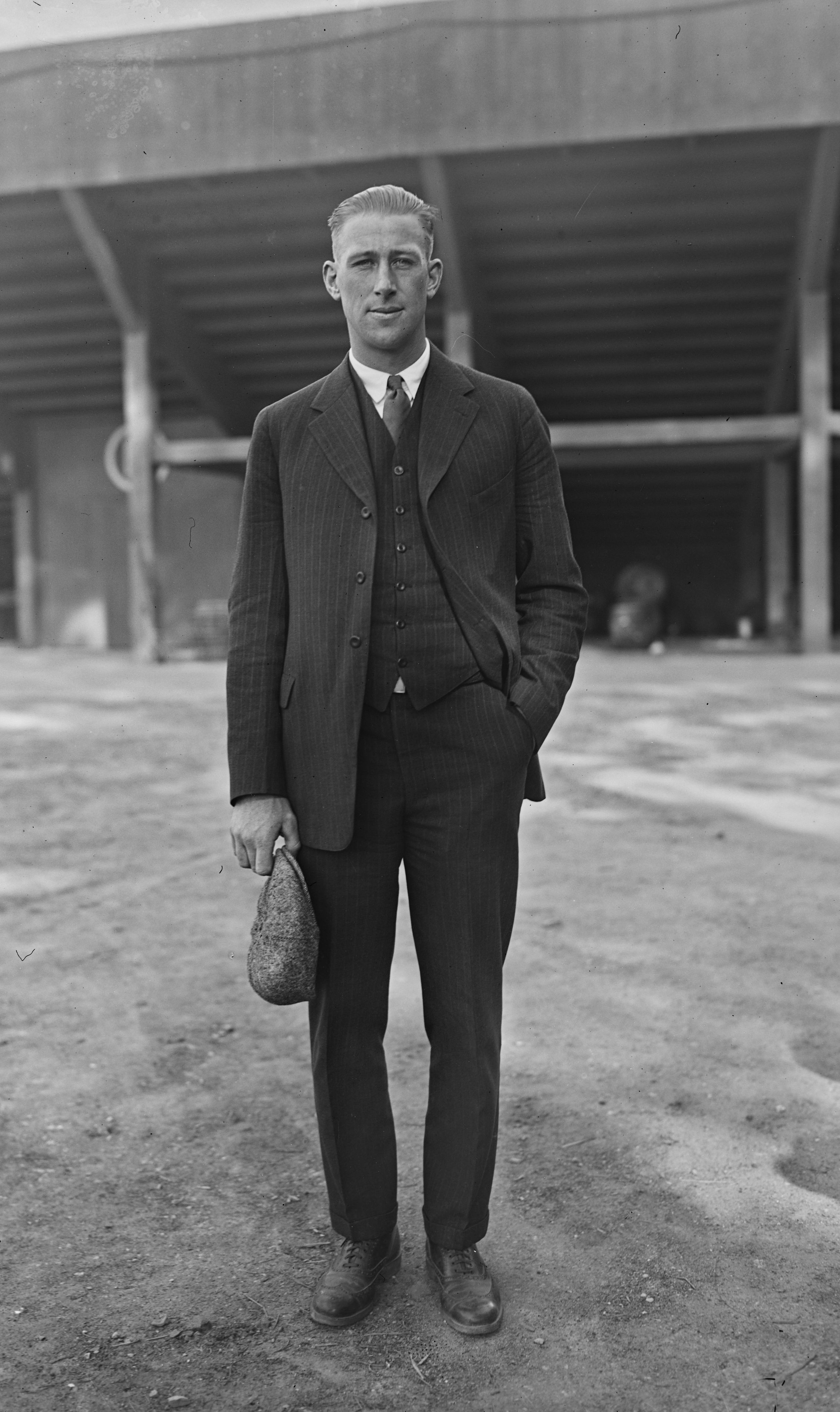
Colby "Babe" Slater served as captain for the United States team during the 1924 Olympics.

United States International Rugby Capped Players
No.	Name	Position	Date of debut	Opposition	Competition	Venue	Ref.
1	Chester Allen	Center	Nov 16, 1912	Australia	Test match	California Field; Berkeley	
2	James Arrell	Prop	Nov 16, 1912	Australia	Test match	California Field; Berkeley	
3	Charles Austin	Center	Nov 16, 1912	Australia	Test match	California Field; Berkeley	
4	Benjamin Erb	Full-back	Nov 16, 1912	Australia	Test match	California Field; Berkeley	
5	Deke Gard	Flanker	Nov 16, 1912	Australia	Test match	California Field; Berkeley	
6	Phillip Harrigan	Fly-half	Nov 16, 1912	Australia	Test match	California Field; Berkeley	
7	William King	Flanker	Nov 16, 1912	Australia	Test match	California Field; Berkeley	
8	Joseph McKim	Prop	Nov 16, 1912	Australia	Test match	California Field; Berkeley	
9	Chris Momson	No. 8	Nov 16, 1912	Australia	Test match	California Field; Berkeley	
10	Laird Morris	Scrum-half	Nov 16, 1912	Australia	Test match	California Field; Berkeley	
11	Ralph Noble	Wing	Nov 16, 1912	Australia	Test match	California Field; Berkeley	
12	Stirling Peart	Wing	Nov 16, 1912	Australia	Test match	California Field; Berkeley	
13	Augustus Sanborn	Hooker	Nov 16, 1912	Australia	Test match	California Field; Berkeley	
14	Karl Schaupp	Lock	Nov 16, 1912	Australia	Test match	California Field; Berkeley	
15	Warren Smith	Lock	Nov 16, 1912	Australia	Test match	California Field; Berkeley	
16	Roland Blase	Lock	Nov 15, 1913	New Zealand	Test match	California Field; Berkeley	
17	Daniel Carroll	Center	Nov 15, 1913	New Zealand	Test match	California Field; Berkeley	
18	Louis Cass	Scrum-half	Nov 15, 1913	New Zealand	Test match	California Field; Berkeley	
19	William Darsie	Flanker	Nov 15, 1913	New Zealand	Test match	California Field; Berkeley	
20	G. Glasscock	Prop	Nov 15, 1913	New Zealand	Test match	California Field; Berkeley	
21	Elwin Hall	Hooker	Nov 15, 1913	New Zealand	Test match	California Field; Berkeley	
22	Mow Mitchell	Fly-half	Nov 15, 1913	New Zealand	Test match	California Field; Berkeley	
23	J. A. Ramage	Full-back	Nov 15, 1913	New Zealand	Test match	California Field; Berkeley	
24	Joseph Urban	Wing	Nov 15, 1913	New Zealand	Test match	California Field; Berkeley	
25	Guy Voight	Lock	Nov 15, 1913	New Zealand	Test match	California Field; Berkeley	
26	A. Knowles	(Fly-half)	Nov 15, 1913	New Zealand	Test match	California Field; Berkeley	
27	Herbert Stolz	(Full-back)	Nov 15, 1913	New Zealand	Test match	California Field; Berkeley	
28	Charles Doe	Flanker	Sep 5, 1920	France XV	1920 Summer Olympics	Olympisch Stadion; Antwerp	
29	George Fish	No. 8	Sep 5, 1920	France XV	1920 Summer Olympics	Olympisch Stadion; Antwerp	
30	James Fitzpatrick	Prop	Sep 5, 1920	France XV	1920 Summer Olympics	Olympisch Stadion; Antwerp	
31	Joseph Hunter	Lock	Sep 5, 1920	France XV	1920 Summer Olympics	Olympisch Stadion; Antwerp	
32	Morris Kirksey	Lock	Sep 5, 1920	France XV	1920 Summer Olympics	Olympisch Stadion; Antwerp	
33	Charles Mehan	Scrum-half	Sep 5, 1920	France XV	1920 Summer Olympics	Olympisch Stadion; Antwerp	
34	John Muldoon	Prop	Sep 5, 1920	France XV	1920 Summer Olympics	Olympisch Stadion; Antwerp	
35	John O'Neil	Hooker	Sep 5, 1920	France XV	1920 Summer Olympics	Olympisch Stadion; Antwerp	
36	John Patrick	Center	Sep 5, 1920	France XV	1920 Summer Olympics	Olympisch Stadion; Antwerp	
37	Erwin Righter	Wing	Sep 5, 1920	France XV	1920 Summer Olympics	Olympisch Stadion; Antwerp	
38	Rudolph Scholz	Fly-half	Sep 5, 1920	France XV	1920 Summer Olympics	Olympisch Stadion; Antwerp	
39	Dink Templeton	Full-back	Sep 5, 1920	France XV	1920 Summer Olympics	Olympisch Stadion; Antwerp	
40	Charles Lee Tilden Jr.	Wing	Sep 5, 1920	France XV	1920 Summer Olympics	Olympisch Stadion; Antwerp	
41	Heaton Wrenn	Center	Sep 5, 1920	France XV	1920 Summer Olympics	Olympisch Stadion; Antwerp	
42	G. W. Davis	Full-back	Oct 10, 1920	France	Test match	Stade Olympique Yves-du-Manoir; Colombes	
43	Colby Slater	Lock	Oct 10, 1920	France	Test match	Stade Olympique Yves-du-Manoir; Colombes	
44	Eugene Luther Vidal	Wing	Oct 10, 1920	France	Test match	Stade Olympique Yves-du-Manoir; Colombes	
45	Harold von Schmidt	Fly-half	Oct 10, 1920	France	Test match	Stade Olympique Yves-du-Manoir; Colombes	
46	D. Wallace	Flanker	Oct 10, 1920	France	Test match	Stade Olympique Yves-du-Manoir; Colombes	
47	J. Winston	Flanker	Oct 10, 1920	France	Test match	Stade Olympique Yves-du-Manoir; Colombes	
48	Philip Clark	Flanker	May 11, 1924	Romania	1924 Summer Olympics	Stade Olympique Yves-du-Manoir; Colombes	
49	Norman Cleaveland	Center	May 11, 1924	Romania	1924 Summer Olympics	Stade Olympique Yves-du-Manoir; Colombes	
50	Robert Devereaux	Wing	May 11, 1924	Romania	1924 Summer Olympics	Stade Olympique Yves-du-Manoir; Colombes	
51	George Dixon	Fly-half	May 11, 1924	Romania	1924 Summer Olympics	Stade Olympique Yves-du-Manoir; Colombes	
52	Edward Graff	Prop	May 11, 1924	Romania	1924 Summer Olympics	Stade Olympique Yves-du-Manoir; Colombes	
53	Richard Hyland	Wing	May 11, 1924	Romania	1924 Summer Olympics	Stade Olympique Yves-du-Manoir; Colombes	
54	Caesar Mannelli	Prop	May 11, 1924	Romania	1924 Summer Olympics	Stade Olympique Yves-du-Manoir; Colombes	
55	Norman Slater	Flanker	May 11, 1924	Romania	1924 Summer Olympics	Stade Olympique Yves-du-Manoir; Colombes	
56	Edward Turkington	Fly-half	May 11, 1924	Romania	1924 Summer Olympics	Stade Olympique Yves-du-Manoir; Colombes	
57	Alan Valentine	Lock	May 11, 1924	Romania	1924 Summer Olympics	Stade Olympique Yves-du-Manoir; Colombes	
58	Alan Williams	No. 8	May 11, 1924	Romania	1924 Summer Olympics	Stade Olympique Yves-du-Manoir; Colombes	
59	Dudley DeGroot	Flanker	May 18, 1924	France	1924 Summer Olympics	Stade Olympique Yves-du-Manoir; Colombes	
60	Linn Farrish	Lock	May 18, 1924	France	1924 Summer Olympics	Stade Olympique Yves-du-Manoir; Colombes	
61	William Rogers	Wing	May 18, 1924	France	1924 Summer Olympics	Stade Olympique Yves-du-Manoir; Colombes	

== Modern-era ==
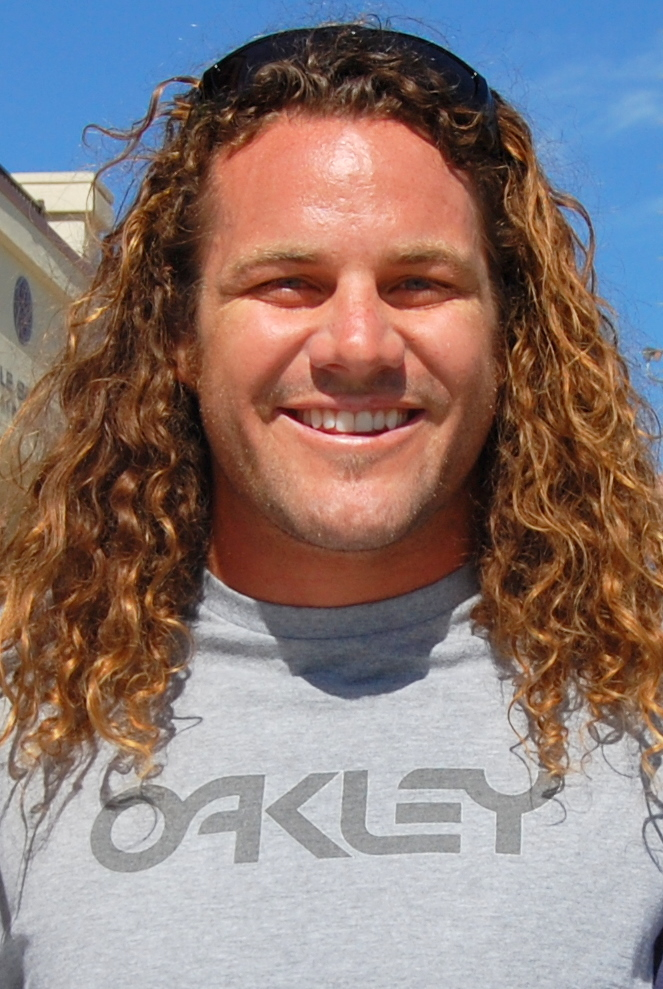
Former Eagles captain Todd Clever retired from international test rugby in 2017 with 76 caps—the most in team history.

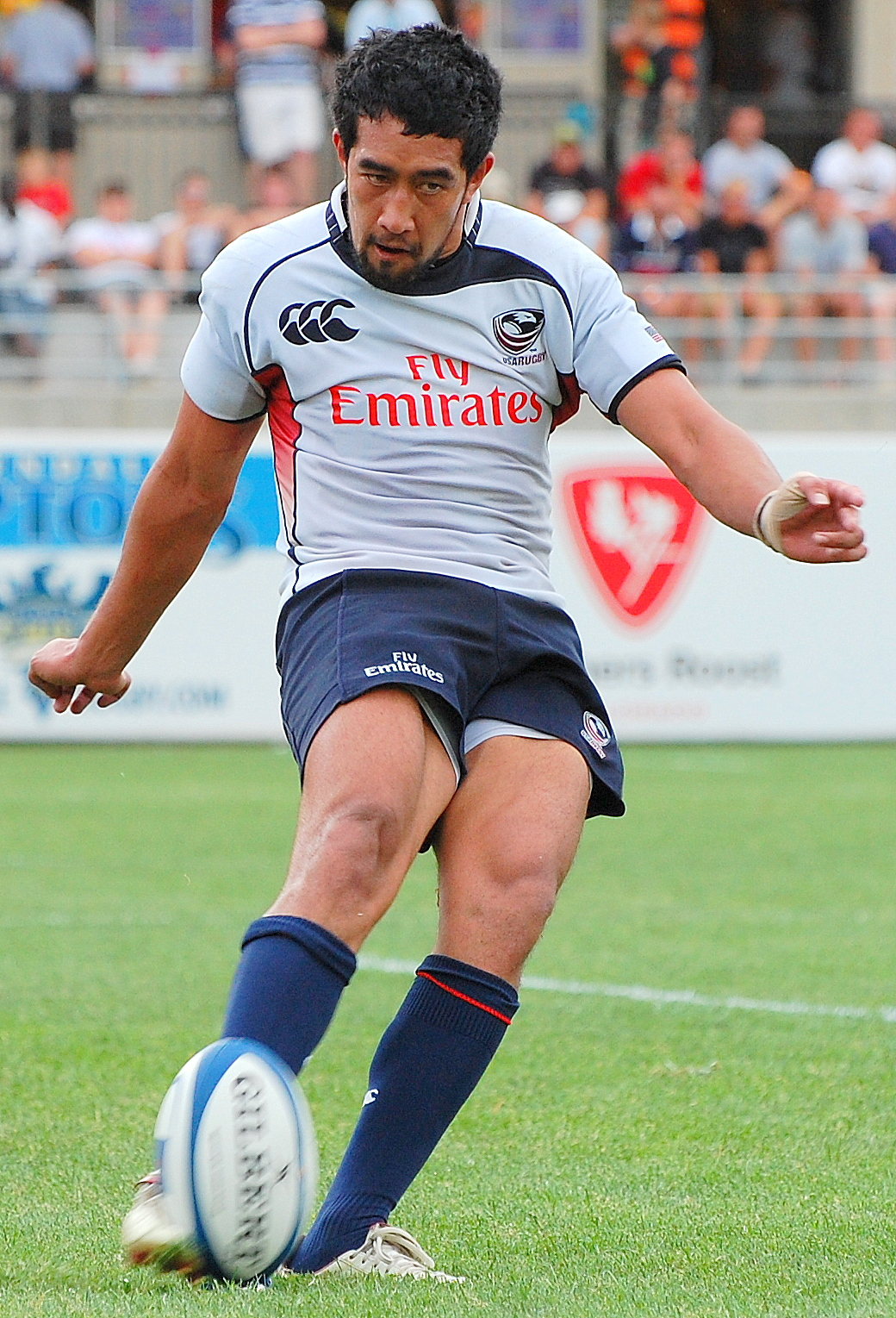
Nese Malifa played for the Eagles at the Rugby World Cup in 2007 and 2011.

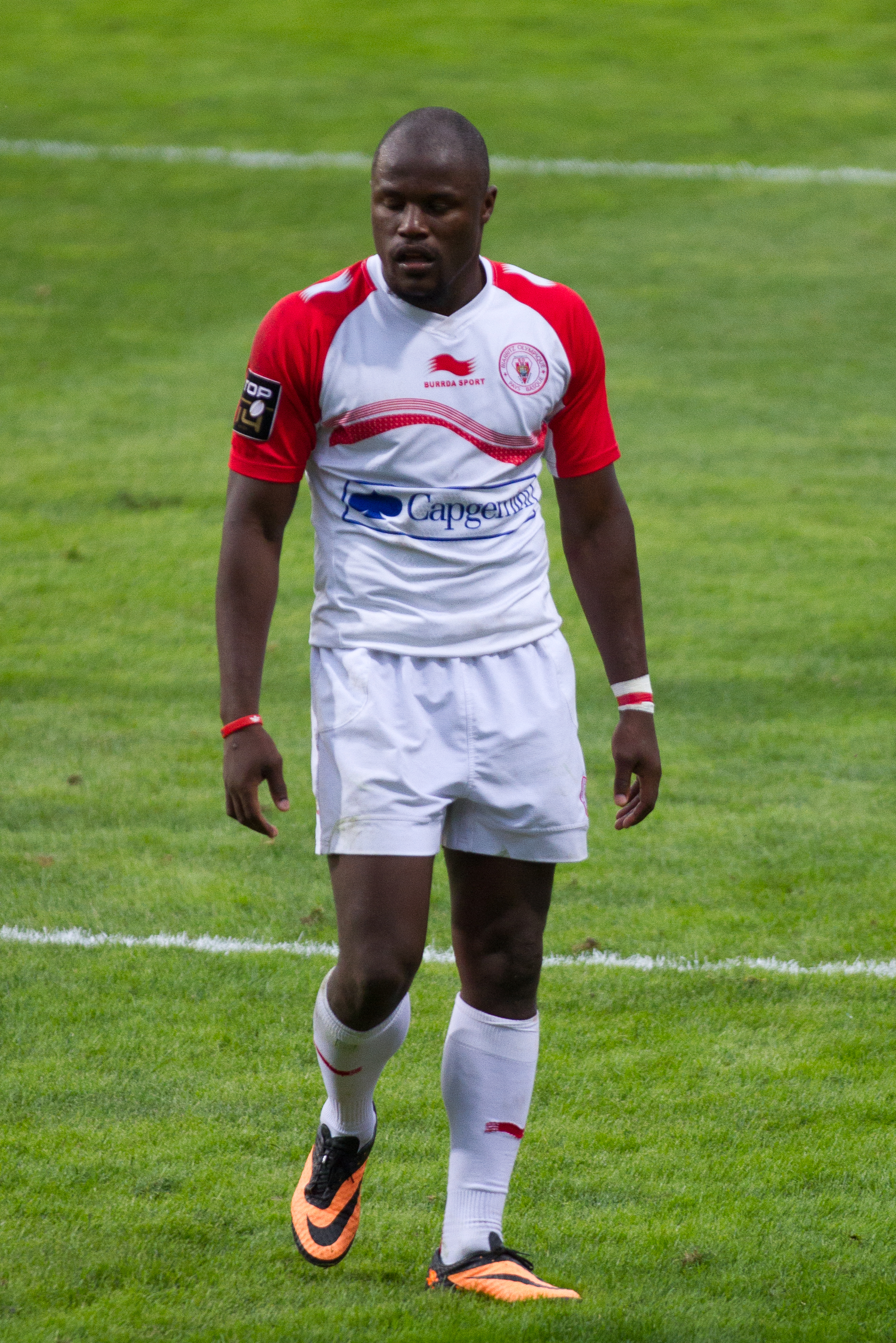
Takudzwa Ngwenya won the inaugural IRPA Try of the Year award in 2007.

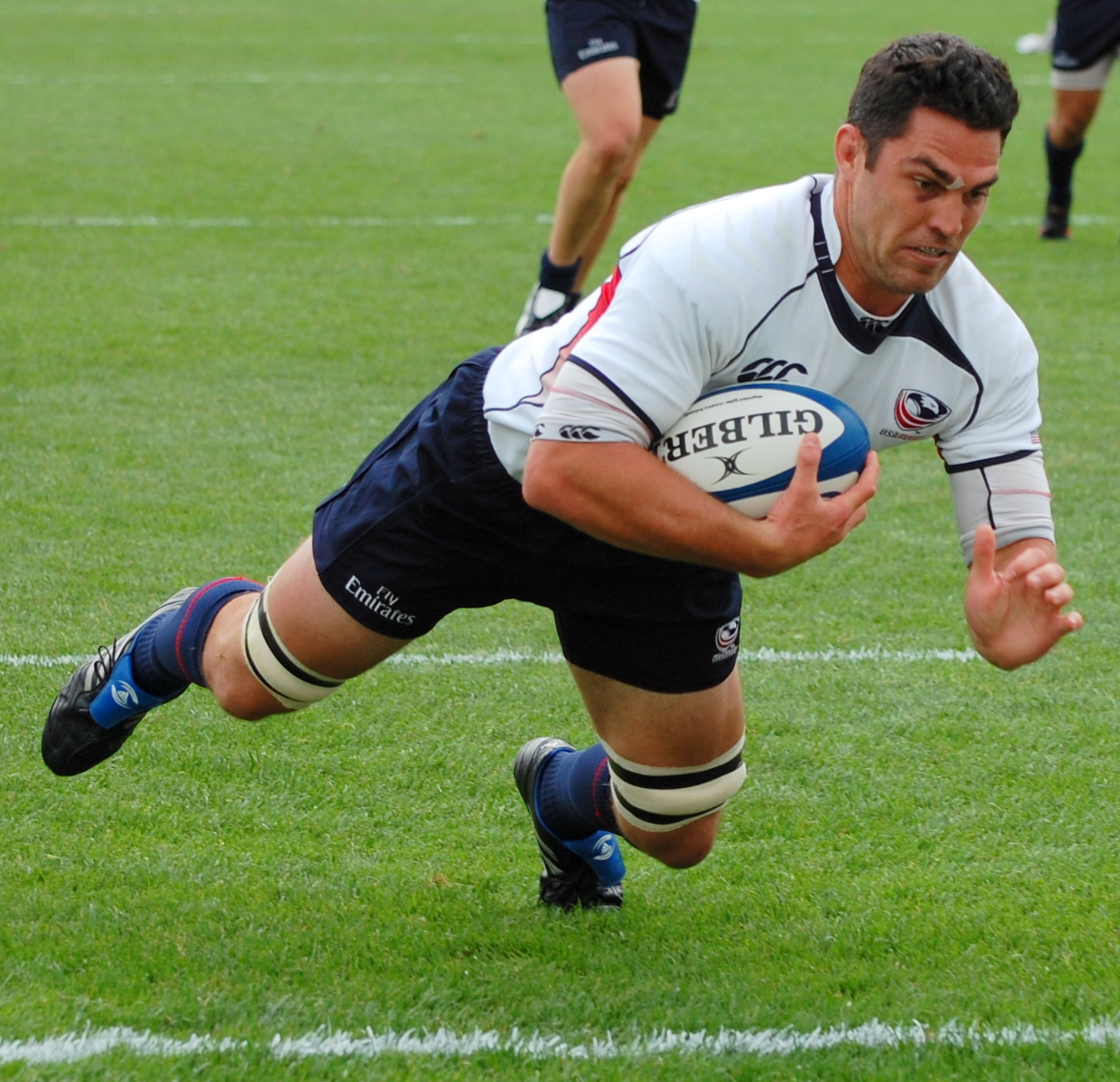
Pat Danahy played for the Eagles at the 2011 Rugby World Cup.

United States Internationally Capped Rugby Players
No.	Name	Position	Date of debut	Opposition	Competition	Venue	Ref.
62	Steve Auerbach	Wing	Jan 31, 1976	Australia	Test match	Glover Field; Los Angeles	
63	Robbie Bordley	Fly-half	Jan 31, 1976	Australia	Test match	Glover Field; Los Angeles	
64	Gary Brackett	Lock	Jan 31, 1976	Australia	Test match	Glover Field; Los Angeles	
65	Del Chipman	Wing	Jan 31, 1976	Australia	Test match	Glover Field; Los Angeles	
66	Fred Khasigian	Hooker	Jan 31, 1976	Australia	Test match	Glover Field; Los Angeles	
67	Tom Klein	Flanker	Jan 31, 1976	Australia	Test match	Glover Field; Los Angeles	
68	Skip Niebauer	Flanker	Jan 31, 1976	Australia	Test match	Glover Field; Los Angeles	
69	Mickey Ording	Prop	Jan 31, 1976	Australia	Test match	Glover Field; Los Angeles	
70	Kip Oxman	Full-back	Jan 31, 1976	Australia	Test match	Glover Field; Los Angeles	
71	Greg Schneeweis	Center	Jan 31, 1976	Australia	Test match	Glover Field; Los Angeles	
72	Tom Selfridge	No. 8	Jan 31, 1976	Australia	Test match	Glover Field; Los Angeles	
73	David Stephenson	Center	Jan 31, 1976	Australia	Test match	Glover Field; Los Angeles	
74	Eric Swanson	Prop	Jan 31, 1976	Australia	Test match	Glover Field; Los Angeles	
75	Craig Sweeney	Lock	Jan 31, 1976	Australia	Test match	Glover Field; Los Angeles	
76	Mike Swiderski	Scrum-half	Jan 31, 1976	Australia	Test match	Glover Field; Los Angeles	
77	Bill Fraumann	No. 8	Jun 12, 1976	France	Test match	Rockne Stadium; Chicago	
78	Steve Gray	Fly-half	Jun 12, 1976	France	Test match	Rockne Stadium; Chicago	
79	Don Guest	Wing	Jun 12, 1976	France	Test match	Rockne Stadium; Chicago	
80	Dennis Murphy	Prop	Jun 12, 1976	France	Test match	Rockne Stadium; Chicago	
81	Morris O'Donnell	Hooker	Jun 12, 1976	France	Test match	Rockne Stadium; Chicago	
82	Terry Scott	Scrum-half	Jun 12, 1976	France	Test match	Rockne Stadium; Chicago	
83	Woody Stone	Wing	Jun 12, 1976	France	Test match	Rockne Stadium; Chicago	
84	Danny Wack	Center	Jun 12, 1976	France	Test match	Rockne Stadium; Chicago	
85	Barry Waite	Flanker	Jun 12, 1976	France	Test match	Rockne Stadium; Chicago	
86	Bob Causey	Lock	May 21, 1977	Canada	Test match	Sports Complex; Burnaby	
87	Jay Hanson	Hooker	May 21, 1977	Canada	Test match	Sports Complex; Burnaby	
88	Bruce Henderson	Prop	May 21, 1977	Canada	Test match	Sports Complex; Burnaby	
89	Dennis Jablonski	Full-back	May 21, 1977	Canada	Test match	Sports Complex; Burnaby	
90	Scott Kelso	Scrum-half	May 21, 1977	Canada	Test match	Sports Complex; Burnaby	
91	Mike Liscovitz	Wing	May 21, 1977	Canada	Test match	Sports Complex; Burnaby	
92	Jeff Lombard	Flanker	May 21, 1977	Canada	Test match	Sports Complex; Burnaby	
93	Mike Sherlock	Prop	May 21, 1977	Canada	Test match	Sports Complex; Burnaby	
94	Clarence Culpepper	Flanker	Oct 15, 1977	England XV	Test match	Twickenham Stadium; Twickenham	
95	Rob Duncanson	Wing	Oct 15, 1977	England XV	Test match	Twickenham Stadium; Twickenham	
96	Mike Halliday	Center	Oct 15, 1977	England XV	Test match	Twickenham Stadium; Twickenham	
97	Eric Parthmore	Prop	Oct 15, 1977	England XV	Test match	Twickenham Stadium; Twickenham	
98	Tom Altemeier	Lock	May 28, 1978	Canada	Test match	Baltimore	
99	Brad Andrews	No. 8	May 28, 1978	Canada	Test match	Baltimore	
100	Gerry Kelleher	Lock	May 28, 1978	Canada	Test match	Baltimore	
101	Jessie Lopez	Hooker	May 28, 1978	Canada	Test match	Baltimore	
102	Gary Wilson	Prop	May 28, 1978	Canada	Test match	Baltimore	
103	Rick Bailey	Prop	Jun 9, 1979	Canada	Test match	Stanley Park; Toronto	
104	Dave Briley	Prop	Jun 9, 1979	Canada	Test match	Stanley Park; Toronto	
105	Jack Clark	Lock	Jun 9, 1979	Canada	Test match	Stanley Park; Toronto	
106	Dick Cooke	Scrum-half	Jun 9, 1979	Canada	Test match	Stanley Park; Toronto	
107	Mike Fanucchi	Center	Jun 9, 1979	Canada	Test match	Stanley Park; Toronto	
108	Jeff Hollings	Hooker	Jun 9, 1979	Canada	Test match	Stanley Park; Toronto	
109	Boyd Morrison	Center	Jun 9, 1979	Canada	Test match	Stanley Park; Toronto	
110	Chimere Okezie	Wing	Jun 9, 1979	Canada	Test match	Stanley Park; Toronto	
111	Joe Sheitlin	Wing	Jun 9, 1979	Canada	Test match	Stanley Park; Toronto	
112	John Fowler	Flanker	May 10, 1980	Wales XV	Test match	George Allen Field; Long Beach	
113	Tim Moser	Lock	May 10, 1980	Wales XV	Test match	George Allen Field; Long Beach	
114	Mike Purcell	Wing	May 10, 1980	Wales XV	Test match	George Allen Field; Long Beach	
115	Brian Swords	Lock	May 10, 1980	Wales XV	Test match	George Allen Field; Long Beach	
116	Douglas Parks	Full-back	Jun 8, 1980	Canada	Test match	Saranac Lake	
117	Tom Smith	Fly-half	Jun 8, 1980	Canada	Test match	Saranac Lake	
118	Lin Walton	Wing	Jun 8, 1980	Canada	Test match	Saranac Lake	
119	Ed Burlingham	Lock	Oct 8, 1980	New Zealand XV	Test match	San Diego Stadium; San Diego	
120	Chip Howard	Full-back	Oct 8, 1980	New Zealand XV	Test match	San Diego Stadium; San Diego	
121	Tim O'Brien	Wing	Oct 8, 1980	New Zealand XV	Test match	San Diego Stadium; San Diego	
122	Denis Shanagher	Center	Oct 8, 1980	New Zealand XV	Test match	San Diego Stadium; San Diego	
123	Art Ward	No. 8	Oct 8, 1980	New Zealand XV	Test match	San Diego Stadium; San Diego	
124	Roy Helu	Center	Jun 6, 1981	Canada	Test match	Calgary	
125	Gary Lambert	Flanker	Jun 6, 1981	Canada	Test match	Calgary	
126	Steve Finkel	(Flanker)	Jun 6, 1981	Canada	Test match	Calgary	
127	Jamie Grant	Hooker	Sep 25, 1981	South Africa	Test match	Owl Creek Polo Field; Glenville	
128	Dave Bateman	Scrum-half	Jun 12, 1982	Canada	Test match	Bleecker Stadium; Albany	
129	John Jelaco	Prop	Jun 12, 1982	Canada	Test match	Bleecker Stadium; Albany	
130	Bo Meyersieck	Fly-half	Jun 12, 1982	Canada	Test match	Bleecker Stadium; Albany	
131	Kirk Miles	Hooker	Jun 12, 1982	Canada	Test match	Bleecker Stadium; Albany	
132	Ian Gunn	Full-back	Jun 19, 1982	England XV	Test match	Dillon Stadium; Hartford	
133	Terry Whelan	Prop	Jun 19, 1982	England XV	Test match	Dillon Stadium; Hartford	James Manera - center, USA Eagles
134	Fred Paoli	(Prop)	Jun 19, 1982	England XV	Test match	Dillon Stadium; Hartford	
135	Rick Crivellone	Lock	Jun 11, 1983	Canada	Test match	Sports Complex; Burnaby	
136	Ray Nelson	Full-back	Jun 11, 1983	Canada	Test match	Sports Complex; Burnaby	
137	Mark Ormsby	Wing	Jun 11, 1983	Canada	Test match	Sports Complex; Burnaby	James Manera reserve, US Eagles
138	Doug Straehley	Scrum-half	Jun 11, 1983	Canada	Test match	Sports Complex; Burnaby	
139	Blane Warhurst	Flanker	Jun 11, 1983	Canada	Test match	Sports Complex; Burnaby	
140	Jake Burkhardt	(Flanker)	Jun 11, 1983	Canada	Test match	Sports Complex; Burnaby	
141	Bill Shiflet	(Lock)	Jun 11, 1983	Canada	Test match	Sports Complex; Burnaby	
142	Neal Brendel	Prop	Jul 9, 1983	Australia	Test match	Sydney Cricket Ground; Sydney	
143	Mark Deaton	No. 8	Jul 9, 1983	Australia	Test match	Sydney Cricket Ground; Sydney	
144	Jon Hartman	Wing	Jul 9, 1983	Australia	Test match	Sydney Cricket Ground; Sydney	
145	Ian Loveseth	(No. 8)	Jul 9, 1983	Australia	Test match	Sydney Cricket Ground; Sydney	
146	Mike Caulder	Fly-half	Jun 9, 1984	Canada	Test match	Rockne Stadium; Chicago	
147	John Everett	Hooker	Jun 9, 1984	Canada	Test match	Rockne Stadium; Chicago	
148	Butch Horwath	Prop	Jun 9, 1984	Canada	Test match	Rockne Stadium; Chicago	
149	Dave Jenkinson	Center	Jun 9, 1984	Canada	Test match	Rockne Stadium; Chicago	
150	Whit Everett	Flanker	Apr 21, 1985	Japan	Test match	Prince Chichibu Memorial Stadium; Tokyo	
151	Kevin Higgins	Wing	Apr 21, 1985	Japan	Test match	Prince Chichibu Memorial Stadium; Tokyo	
152	Mike Inns	Full-back	Apr 21, 1985	Japan	Test match	Prince Chichibu Memorial Stadium; Tokyo	
153	Willie Jefferson	Wing	Apr 21, 1985	Japan	Test match	Prince Chichibu Memorial Stadium; Tokyo	
154	Kevin Swords	Lock	Apr 21, 1985	Japan	Test match	Prince Chichibu Memorial Stadium; Tokyo	
155	Bruce Monroe	Hooker	Nov 16, 1985	Canada	Test match	Thunderbird Stadium; Vancouver	
156	Joe Clarkson	Fly-half	May 31, 1986	Japan	Test match	Murdock Stadium; Torrance	
157	Dave Dickson	Scrum-half	May 31, 1986	Japan	Test match	Murdock Stadium; Torrance	
158	Lance Manga	Prop	May 31, 1986	Japan	Test match	Murdock Stadium; Torrance	
159	Brian Vizard	No. 8	May 31, 1986	Japan	Test match	Murdock Stadium; Torrance	
160	Dave Horton	Fly-half	Nov 8, 1986	Canada	Test match	Tucson	
161	John Mickel	Scrum-half	Nov 8, 1986	Canada	Test match	Tucson	
162	Tom Vinick	Center	Nov 8, 1986	Canada	Test match	Tucson	
163	Alec Montgomery	(Full-back)	Nov 8, 1986	Canada	Test match	Tucson	
164	Bill Bernhard	Full-back	May 3, 1987	Tunisia	Test match	Pebble Beach	
165	Gary Hein	Wing	May 3, 1987	Tunisia	Test match	Pebble Beach	
166	Mike Saunders	Scrum-half	May 3, 1987	Tunisia	Test match	Pebble Beach	
167	Pat Johnson	Hooker	May 10, 1987	Canada	Test match	Thunderbird Stadium; Vancouver	
168	Tony Ridnell	Flanker	May 31, 1987	Australia	1987 Rugby World Cup	Ballymore Stadium; Brisbane	
169	Mark Carlson	Flanker	Nov 7, 1987	Wales	Test match	National Stadium; Cardiff	
170	Chris Doherty	Center	Nov 7, 1987	Wales	Test match	National Stadium; Cardiff	
171	Jeff Peter	Flanker	Nov 7, 1987	Wales	Test match	National Stadium; Cardiff	
172	Mark Williams	Fly-half	Nov 7, 1987	Wales	Test match	National Stadium; Cardiff	
173	Ron Zenker	Lock	Nov 7, 1987	Wales	Test match	National Stadium; Cardiff	
174	Sam Vaka	(Center)	Nov 14, 1987	Canada	Test match	Royal Athletic Park; Victoria, British Columbia	
175	Shawn Lipman	Flanker	Jun 11, 1988	Canada	Test match	Saranac Lake	
176	Chris O'Brien	Fly-half	Jun 11, 1988	Canada	Test match	Saranac Lake	
177	Mike Smith	Wing	Jun 11, 1988	Canada	Test match	Saranac Lake	
178	Barry Williams	Wing	Jun 11, 1988	Canada	Test match	Saranac Lake	
179	Bill Leversee	(Lock)	Sep 17, 1988	Romania	Test match	Sparta Stadium; Moscow	
180	Jon Knutson	(Flanker)	Sep 25, 1988	Soviet Union	Test match	Sparta Stadium; Moscow	
181	Rob Farley	Flanker	Sep 9, 1989	Ireland XV	Test match	Downing Stadium; New York	
182	Gerry McDonald	Prop	Sep 9, 1989	Ireland XV	Test match	Downing Stadium; New York	
183	Mike Siano	Flanker	Sep 9, 1989	Ireland XV	Test match	Downing Stadium; New York	
184	Russ Isaac	Lock	Sep 23, 1989	Canada	1991 Rugby World Cup Qualifier	Stanley Park; Toronto	
185	Chris Lippert	Prop	Sep 23, 1989	Canada	1991 Rugby World Cup Qualifier	Stanley Park; Toronto	
186	Brian Corcoran	Wing	Nov 7, 1989	Uruguay	Test match	Carrasco Polo Club; Montevideo	
187	Barry Daily	Scrum-half	Nov 7, 1989	Uruguay	Test match	Carrasco Polo Club; Montevideo	
188	Tom McCormack	Hooker	Nov 7, 1989	Uruguay	Test match	Carrasco Polo Club; Montevideo	
189	Steve LaPorta	(Center)	Nov 7, 1989	Uruguay	Test match	Carrasco Polo Club; Montevideo	
190	Norm Mottram	Prop	Apr 7, 1990	Argentina	1991 Rugby World Cup Qualifier	Santa Barbara	
191	Mark Sawicki	Flanker	Apr 7, 1990	Argentina	1991 Rugby World Cup Qualifier	Santa Barbara	
192	Joe Burke	Center	Jun 9, 1990	Canada	1991 Rugby World Cup Qualifier	Chief Sealth; Seattle	
193	Mike de Jong	Fly-half	Jun 9, 1990	Canada	1991 Rugby World Cup Qualifier	Chief Sealth; Seattle	
194	Don James	Prop	Jun 9, 1990	Canada	1991 Rugby World Cup Qualifier	Chief Sealth; Seattle	
195	Rory Lewis	Wing	Jun 9, 1990	Canada	1991 Rugby World Cup Qualifier	Chief Sealth; Seattle	
196	Chris Williams	Wing	Jun 9, 1990	Canada	1991 Rugby World Cup Qualifier	Chief Sealth; Seattle	
197	Dennis Gonzalez	Flanker	Jul 8, 1990	Australia	Test match	Ballymore Stadium; Brisbane	
198	Tony Flay	Hooker	Sep 23, 1990	Japan	Test match	Prince Chichibu Memorial Stadium; Tokyo	
199	Eric Whitaker	Wing	Sep 23, 1990	Japan	Test match	Prince Chichibu Memorial Stadium; Tokyo	
200	Bill Hayward	Full-back	May 4, 1991	Japan	Test match	Rockne Stadium; Chicago	
201	Ben Hough	Flanker	Jun 8, 1991	Canada	Test match	Calgary	
202	Glenn Judge	Fly-half	Jun 8, 1991	Canada	Test match	Calgary	
203	Mark Pidcock	Scrum-half	Jun 8, 1991	Canada	Test match	Calgary	
204	Jeff Schraml	Hooker	Jun 8, 1991	Canada	Test match	Calgary	
205	Chuck Tunnacliffe	Lock	Jul 20, 1991	France	Test match	Colorado Springs	
206	Paul Sheehy	Full-back	Oct 8, 1991	New Zealand	1991 Rugby World Cup	Kingsholm Stadium; Gloucester	
207	Jay Wilkerson	(Flanker)	Oct 11, 1991	England	1991 Rugby World Cup	Twickenham Stadium; Twickenham	
208	Graham Downes	Prop	Apr 18, 1992	Hong Kong	Test match	Kezar Stadium; San Francisco	
209	James Keller	Lock	Apr 18, 1992	Hong Kong	Test match	Kezar Stadium; San Francisco	
210	Ramon Samaniego	Scrum-half	Apr 18, 1992	Hong Kong	Test match	Kezar Stadium; San Francisco	
211	Rich Schurfield	Wing	Apr 18, 1992	Hong Kong	Test match	Kezar Stadium; San Francisco	
212	Mark Gale	Fly-half	Jun 13, 1992	Canada	Test match	Observatory Park; Denver	
213	Greg Goodman	Scrum-half	Jun 13, 1992	Canada	Test match	Observatory Park; Denver	
214	Brannen Smoot	No. 8	Jun 13, 1992	Canada	Test match	Observatory Park; Denver	
215	David Steinbauer	Flanker	Jun 13, 1992	Canada	Test match	Observatory Park; Denver	
216	B. Tofaeono	Wing	Jun 13, 1992	Canada	Test match	Observatory Park; Denver	
217	Mike Waterman	Center	Jun 13, 1992	Canada	Test match	Observatory Park; Denver	
218	Vaea Anitoni	(Wing)	Jun 13, 1992	Canada	Test match	Observatory Park; Denver	
219	Mark Vandermolen	(Lock)	Jun 13, 1992	Canada	Test match	Observatory Park; Denver	
220	Andre Bachelet	Scrum-half	Jun 19, 1993	Canada	Test match	Twin Elm Park; Winnipeg	
221	Tom Billups	Hooker	Jun 19, 1993	Canada	Test match	Twin Elm Park; Winnipeg	
222	Chris Campbell	Flanker	Jun 19, 1993	Canada	Test match	Twin Elm Park; Winnipeg	
223	Wayne Chai	Center	Jun 19, 1993	Canada	Test match	Twin Elm Park; Winnipeg	
224	Brian Geraghty	Center	Jun 19, 1993	Canada	Test match	Twin Elm Park; Winnipeg	
225	Tim Petersen	Prop	Jun 19, 1993	Canada	Test match	Twin Elm Park; Winnipeg	
226	Chris Schlereth	Wing	Jun 19, 1993	Canada	Test match	Twin Elm Park; Winnipeg	
227	Maika Sika	Full-back	Jun 19, 1993	Canada	Test match	Twin Elm Park; Winnipeg	
228	Rob Randell	Lock	Oct 2, 1993	Australia XV	Test match	Riverside	
229	Mark Scharrenberg	Center	Oct 2, 1993	Australia XV	Test match	Riverside	
230	Ed Schram	Center	Oct 2, 1993	Australia XV	Test match	Riverside	
231	Richard Tardits	No. 8	Oct 2, 1993	Australia XV	Test match	Riverside	
232	Steve Hiatt	(Full-back)	Oct 2, 1993	Australia XV	Test match	Riverside	
233	Rob Lumkong	No. 8	Mar 12, 1994	Bermuda	1995 Rugby World Cup Qualifier	Hamilton	
234	Tomasi Takau	Wing	May 28, 1994	Argentina	1995 Rugby World Cup Qualifier	George Allen Field; Long Beach	
235	Scott Bracken	(Prop)	May 28, 1994	Argentina	1995 Rugby World Cup Qualifier	George Allen Field; Long Beach	
236	Ray Green	Center	Nov 5, 1994	Ireland	Test match	Lansdowne Road; Dublin	
237	Dan Lyle	Flanker	Nov 5, 1994	Ireland	Test match	Lansdowne Road; Dublin	
238	Matt Alexander	Fly-half	Sep 9, 1995	Canada	Test match	Fletcher's Fields; Markham	
239	Mike Fabling	Full-back	Sep 9, 1995	Canada	Test match	Fletcher's Fields; Markham	
240	Aaron Freeman	Lock	Sep 9, 1995	Canada	Test match	Fletcher's Fields; Markham	
241	Jon Holtzman	Flanker	Sep 9, 1995	Canada	Test match	Fletcher's Fields; Markham	
242	Ray Lehner	Prop	Sep 9, 1995	Canada	Test match	Fletcher's Fields; Markham	
243	Joe Santos	Wing	Sep 9, 1995	Canada	Test match	Fletcher's Fields; Markham	
244	Pat Malloy	(Lock)	Sep 9, 1995	Canada	Test match	Fletcher's Fields; Markham	
245	Malakai Delai	Wing	Jan 6, 1996	Ireland	Test match	Life Clinic; Marietta	
246	Luke Gross	Lock	Jan 6, 1996	Ireland	Test match	Life Clinic; Marietta	
247	Joe Rissone	Prop	Jan 6, 1996	Ireland	Test match	Life Clinic; Marietta	
248	Jason Walker	(Flanker)	Jan 6, 1996	Ireland	Test match	Life Clinic; Marietta	
249	Cliff Vogl	Lock	May 11, 1996	Canada	Pacific Rim Rugby Championship	Boxer Stadium; San Francisco	
250	Alec Parker	Lock	Jun 8, 1996	Hong Kong	Pacific Rim Rugby Championship	Government Stadium; Hong Kong	
251	Sean Allen	Hooker	Jun 16, 1996	Japan	Pacific Rim Rugby Championship	Prince Chichibu Memorial Stadium; Tokyo	
252	Tim Kluempers	Prop	Jun 16, 1996	Japan	Pacific Rim Rugby Championship	Prince Chichibu Memorial Stadium; Tokyo	
253	Lenny Sanft	(Wing)	Jun 16, 1996	Japan	Pacific Rim Rugby Championship	Prince Chichibu Memorial Stadium; Tokyo	
254	Jared Hopkins	Flanker	Jun 29, 1996	Hong Kong	Pacific Rim Rugby Championship	Boxer Stadium; San Francisco	
255	Bill LeClerc	Prop	Jun 29, 1996	Hong Kong	Pacific Rim Rugby Championship	Boxer Stadium; San Francisco	
256	Juan Grobler	Center	Sep 14, 1996	Argentina	Pan-American Championship	Twin Elm Rugby Park; Nepean	
257	Bob Lockrem	Wing	Sep 18, 1996	Canada	Pan-American Championship	Mohawk Sports Park; Hamilton	
258	Kevin Dalzell	Scrum-half	Sep 21, 1996	Uruguay	Pan-American Championship	Fletcher's Fields; Markham	
259	Dave Hodges	(Back row)	Sep 21, 1996	Uruguay	Pan-American Championship	Fletcher's Fields; Markham	
260	Brian Hightower	Wing	Jan 11, 1997	Wales	Test match	National Stadium; Cardiff	
261	Chris Morrow	(Full-back)	Jan 11, 1997	Wales	Test match	National Stadium; Cardiff	
262	Tini Saulala	Center	May 10, 1997	Canada	Pacific Rim Rugby Championship	Thunderbird Stadium; Vancouver	
263	Mike Stanaway	Prop	May 10, 1997	Canada	Pacific Rim Rugby Championship	Thunderbird Stadium; Vancouver	
264	Chip Curtis	(Wing)	May 10, 1997	Canada	Pacific Rim Rugby Championship	Thunderbird Stadium; Vancouver	
265	Kurt Shuman	(Full-back)	May 17, 1997	Hong Kong	Pacific Rim Rugby Championship	Aberdeen Stadium; Hong Kong	
266	Mika McLeod	Flanker	Jun 7, 1997	Japan	Pacific Rim Rugby Championship	Boxer Stadium; San Francisco	
267	Dan Kennedy	Full-back	Jun 14, 1997	Hong Kong	Pacific Rim Rugby Championship	Boxer Stadium; San Francisco	
268	Scott Yungling	Flanker	Jun 14, 1997	Hong Kong	Pacific Rim Rugby Championship	Boxer Stadium; San Francisco	
269	David Care	Flanker	Apr 8, 1998	Portugal	Test match	Estádio Universitário de Lisboa; Lisbon	
270	John McBride	Prop	Apr 8, 1998	Portugal	Test match	Estádio Universitário de Lisboa; Lisbon	
271	Andre Blom	Full-back	Apr 12, 1998	Spain	Test match	El Puerto de Santa María	
272	Jason Raven	Wing	May 23, 1998	Canada	Pacific Rim Rugby Championship	Thunderbird Stadium; Vancouver	
273	Bart Furrow	(Prop)	May 23, 1998	Canada	Pacific Rim Rugby Championship	Thunderbird Stadium; Vancouver	
274	C.D. Labounty	Wing	Jun 6, 1998	Canada	Pacific Rim Rugby Championship	Burlington	
275	Fifita Mounga	No. 8	Jun 6, 1998	Canada	Pacific Rim Rugby Championship	Burlington	
276	Shaun Paga	Flanker	Jun 6, 1998	Canada	Pacific Rim Rugby Championship	Burlington	
277	George Sucher	(Prop)	Jun 6, 1998	Canada	Pacific Rim Rugby Championship	Burlington	
278	Malakai Tabuvuya	Wing	Jun 20, 1998	Hong Kong	Pacific Rim Rugby Championship	Boxer Stadium; San Francisco	
279	Britt Howard	(Scrum-half)	Jun 20, 1998	Hong Kong	Pacific Rim Rugby Championship	Boxer Stadium; San Francisco	
280	Doug Gillies	No. 8	Aug 15, 1998	Argentina	1999 Rugby World Cup Qualifier	Cricket and Rugby Club; Buenos Aires	
281	Kirk Khasigian	(Hooker)	Aug 15, 1998	Argentina	1999 Rugby World Cup Qualifier	Cricket and Rugby Club; Buenos Aires	
282	Bob LeClerc	Lock	Aug 18, 1998	Canada	1999 Rugby World Cup Qualifier	San Isidro, Buenos Aires	
283	Ian Stevens	Fly-half	Aug 18, 1998	Canada	1999 Rugby World Cup Qualifier	San Isidro, Buenos Aires	
284	Philippe Farner	Lock	May 15, 1999	Tonga	Pacific Rim Rugby Championship	Boxer Stadium; San Francisco	
285	David Niu	(Fly-half)	May 15, 1999	Tonga	Pacific Rim Rugby Championship	Boxer Stadium; San Francisco	
286	Joe Clayton	Prop	Jun 19, 1999	Canada	Pacific Rim Rugby Championship	Stanley Park; Toronto	
287	Marc L'Huillier	(Prop)	Aug 21, 1999	England	Test match	Twickenham Stadium; Twickenham	
288	Jesse Coulson	(Scrum-half)	Oct 14, 1999	Australia	1999 Rugby World Cup	Thomond Park; Limerick	
289	Eric Reed	(Lock)	Oct 14, 1999	Australia	1999 Rugby World Cup	Thomond Park; Limerick	
290	Philip Eloff	Center	May 27, 2000	Japan	Pacific Rim Rugby Championship	Kintetsu Hanazono Rugby Stadium; Osaka	
291	Matt Kane	Lock	May 27, 2000	Japan	Pacific Rim Rugby Championship	Kintetsu Hanazono Rugby Stadium; Osaka	
292	Kort Schubert	Flanker	May 27, 2000	Japan	Pacific Rim Rugby Championship	Kintetsu Hanazono Rugby Stadium; Osaka	
293	Grant Wells	Fly-half	May 27, 2000	Japan	Pacific Rim Rugby Championship	Kintetsu Hanazono Rugby Stadium; Osaka	
294	Don Younger	Flanker	May 27, 2000	Japan	Pacific Rim Rugby Championship	Kintetsu Hanazono Rugby Stadium; Osaka	
295	Tom Kelleher	Lock	Jun 3, 2000	Canada	Pacific Rim Rugby Championship	Manchester	
296	John Burke	(Flanker)	Jun 3, 2000	Canada	Pacific Rim Rugby Championship	Manchester	
297	Robbie Flynn	(Hooker)	Jun 3, 2000	Canada	Pacific Rim Rugby Championship	Manchester	
298	Link Wilfley	(Fly-half)	Jun 10, 2000	Ireland	Test match	Manchester	
299	Olo Fifita	Flanker	Jun 30, 2000	Fiji	Pacific Rim Rugby Championship	Apia Park; Apia	
300	Mike MacDonald	(Prop)	Jun 30, 2000	Fiji	Pacific Rim Rugby Championship	Apia Park; Apia	
301	Roger Grant	Wing	Jul 7, 2000	Tonga	Pacific Rim Rugby Championship	Teufaiva Sport Stadium; Nukuʻalofa	
302	Jason Gillam	(Flanker)	Jul 7, 2000	Tonga	Pacific Rim Rugby Championship	Teufaiva Sport Stadium; Nukuʻalofa	
303	Mose Timoteo	(Scrum-half)	Jul 7, 2000	Tonga	Pacific Rim Rugby Championship	Teufaiva Sport Stadium; Nukuʻalofa	
304	Jovesa Naivalu	(Wing)	Jul 15, 2000	Samoa	Pacific Rim Rugby Championship	Boxer Stadium; San Francisco	
305	Paul Still	Prop	Nov 4, 2000	Scotland	Test match	Murrayfield Stadium; Edinburgh	
306	Jason Keyter	(Wing)	Nov 18, 2000	Wales	Test match	Millennium Stadium; Cardiff	
307	Alex Magleby	(Flanker)	Nov 18, 2000	Wales	Test match	Millennium Stadium; Cardiff	
308	John Buchholz	Full-back	May 19, 2001	Canada	Pan-American Championship	Richardson Memorial Stadium; Kingston	
309	Kimball Kjar	(Scrum-half)	May 23, 2001	Argentina	Pan-American Championship	Mohawk Sports Park; Hamilton	
310	Jone Naqica	Wing	Jun 16, 2001	England	Test match	Boxer Stadium; San Francisco	
311	Dan Dorsey	(Prop)	Dec 1, 2001	South Africa	Test match	Robertson Stadium; Houston	
312	Brian Surgener	(Lock)	Dec 1, 2001	South Africa	Test match	Robertson Stadium; Houston	
313	Mike Hercus	Fly-half	Jun 22, 2002	Scotland	Test match	Boxer Stadium; San Francisco	
314	Aaron Satchwell	Flanker	Jun 22, 2002	Scotland	Test match	Boxer Stadium; San Francisco	
315	Dan Anderson	(Hooker)	Jun 22, 2002	Scotland	Test match	Boxer Stadium; San Francisco	
316	Conrad Hodgson	(Flanker)	Jun 22, 2002	Scotland	Test match	Boxer Stadium; San Francisco	
317	Andy McGarry	(Prop)	Jun 22, 2002	Scotland	Test match	Boxer Stadium; San Francisco	
318	John Tarpoff	(Prop)	Jun 22, 2002	Scotland	Test match	Boxer Stadium; San Francisco	
319	David Fee	Wing	Jun 29, 2002	Canada	2003 Rugby World Cup Qualifier	Fletcher's Fields; Markham	
320	Cayo Nicolau	(Center)	Jun 29, 2002	Canada	2003 Rugby World Cup Qualifier	Fletcher's Fields; Markham	
321	Chris Miller	(Hooker)	Aug 10, 2002	Chile	2003 Rugby World Cup Qualifier	Murray City Park; Murray	
322	Al Lakomskis	Wing	Aug 24, 2002	Chile	2003 Rugby World Cup Qualifier	Prince of Wales Cricket Club; Santiago	
323	Kain Cross	Center	Apr 12, 2003	Spain	2003 Rugby World Cup Repechage Qualifier	Campo Universitaria; Madrid	
324	Riaan van Zyl	Wing	Apr 12, 2003	Spain	2003 Rugby World Cup Repechage Qualifier	Campo Universitaria; Madrid	
325	Paul Emerick	(Full-back)	Apr 27, 2003	Spain	2003 Rugby World Cup Repechage Qualifier	Lockhart Stadium; Fort Lauderdale	
326	Mark Griffin	(Hooker)	Apr 27, 2003	Spain	2003 Rugby World Cup Repechage Qualifier	Lockhart Stadium; Fort Lauderdale	
327	Christian Long	(Lock)	Apr 27, 2003	Spain	2003 Rugby World Cup Repechage Qualifier	Lockhart Stadium; Fort Lauderdale	
328	Jacob Waasdorp	(Prop)	May 17, 2003	Japan	Super Powers Cup	Boxer Stadium; San Francisco	
329	Jurie Gouws	Flanker	Jun 21, 2003	England A	2003 Churchill Cup	Thunderbird Stadium; Vancouver	
330	Matt Sherman	Fly-half	Jun 28, 2003	England A	2003 Churchill Cup	Thunderbird Stadium; Vancouver	
331	Gerhard Klerck	Lock	Aug 23, 2003	Argentina	2003 Pan-American Championship	Cricket and Rugby Club; Buenos Aires	
332	Richard Liddington	Prop	Aug 23, 2003	Argentina	2003 Pan-American Championship	Cricket and Rugby Club; Buenos Aires	
333	Todd Clever	(Back row)	Aug 23, 2003	Argentina	2003 Pan-American Championship	Cricket and Rugby Club; Buenos Aires	
334	Matt Wyatt	(Hooker)	Aug 23, 2003	Argentina	2003 Pan-American Championship	Cricket and Rugby Club; Buenos Aires	
335	Salesi Sika	(Center)	Oct 15, 2003	Fiji	2003 Rugby World Cup	Lang Park; Brisbane	
336	Albert Tuipulotu	Center	May 27, 2004	Canada	Super Powers Cup	Olympic Stadium; Tokyo	
337	David Williams	(Scrum-half)	May 27, 2004	Canada	Super Powers Cup	Olympic Stadium; Tokyo	
338	Francois Viljoen	Full-back	May 30, 2004	Russia	Super Powers Cup	Prince Chichibu Memorial Stadium; Tokyo	
339	Tony Petruzzella	Flanker	Jun 19, 2004	Canada	Super Powers Cup	Commonwealth Stadium; Edmonton	
340	Chris Osentowski	(Prop)	Nov 27, 2004	Italy	Test match	Stadio Lamarmora; Biella	
341	James Lik	Lock	May 25, 2005	Canada	Super Cup	Olympic Stadium; Tokyo	
342	Mike Palefau	Wing	May 25, 2005	Canada	Super Cup	Olympic Stadium; Tokyo	
343	Andrew Ryland	Flanker	May 25, 2005	Canada	Super Cup	Olympic Stadium; Tokyo	
344	Louis Stanfill	Lock	May 25, 2005	Canada	Super Cup	Olympic Stadium; Tokyo	
345	John Hartman	(Wing)	May 25, 2005	Canada	Super Cup	Olympic Stadium; Tokyo	
346	Mike Mangan	(No. 8)	May 25, 2005	Canada	Super Cup	Olympic Stadium; Tokyo	
347	Mike Hobson	(Hooker)	May 29, 2005	Romania	Super Cup	Prince Chichibu Memorial Stadium; Tokyo	
348	Doug Rowe	(Scrum-half)	May 29, 2005	Romania	Super Cup	Prince Chichibu Memorial Stadium; Tokyo	
349	Mike French	(Prop)	Jun 4, 2005	Wales	Test match	Rentschler Stadium; East Hartford	
350	Scott Jones	Center	Jun 19, 2005	Argentina Jaguares	2005 Churchill Cup	Commonwealth Stadium; Edmonton	
351	Jason Pye	(Wing)	Jun 19, 2005	Argentina Jaguares	2005 Churchill Cup	Commonwealth Stadium; Edmonton	
352	Carl Hansen	(Lock)	Jun 26, 2005	Canada	2005 Churchill Cup	Commonwealth Stadium; Edmonton	
353	Vaha Esikia	Center	Jun 3, 2006	Ireland A	2006 Churchill Cup	Buck Shaw Stadium; Santa Clara	
354	Jeff Hullinger	Wing	Jun 3, 2006	Ireland A	2006 Churchill Cup	Buck Shaw Stadium; Santa Clara	
355	Owen Lentz	Hooker	Jun 3, 2006	Ireland A	2006 Churchill Cup	Buck Shaw Stadium; Santa Clara	
356	Tyson Meek	Scrum-half	Jun 3, 2006	Ireland A	2006 Churchill Cup	Buck Shaw Stadium; Santa Clara	
357	Alipate Tuilevuka	Fly-half	Jun 3, 2006	Ireland A	2006 Churchill Cup	Buck Shaw Stadium; Santa Clara	
358	Mark Aylor	(Back row)	Jun 3, 2006	Ireland A	2006 Churchill Cup	Buck Shaw Stadium; Santa Clara	
359	Brian Barnard	(Wing)	Jun 3, 2006	Ireland A	2006 Churchill Cup	Buck Shaw Stadium; Santa Clara	
360	Patrick Bell	(Prop)	Jun 3, 2006	Ireland A	2006 Churchill Cup	Buck Shaw Stadium; Santa Clara	
361	Brian Schoener	(Lock)	Jun 3, 2006	Ireland A	2006 Churchill Cup	Buck Shaw Stadium; Santa Clara	
362	Jason Kelly	Fly-half	Jun 7, 2006	New Zealand Māori	2006 Churchill Cup	Buck Shaw Stadium; Santa Clara	
363	Jeremy Nash	Wing	Jun 7, 2006	New Zealand Māori	2006 Churchill Cup	Buck Shaw Stadium; Santa Clara	
364	Scott Lawrence	Flanker	Jun 17, 2006	Canada	2006 Churchill Cup	Commonwealth Stadium; Edmonton	
365	Hayden Mexted	Lock	Jul 1, 2006	Barbados	2007 Rugby World Cup Qualifier	Buck Shaw Stadium; Santa Clara	
366	Justin Stencel	Flanker	Aug 12, 2006	Canada	2007 Rugby World Cup Qualifier	Swilers Rugby Park; St. John's	
367	Chad Erskine	(Scrum-half)	Aug 12, 2006	Canada	2007 Rugby World Cup Qualifier	Swilers Rugby Park; St. John's	
368	Adam Russell	(Lock)	Aug 12, 2006	Canada	2007 Rugby World Cup Qualifier	Swilers Rugby Park; St. John's	
369	Jon Vitale	(Prop)	Aug 12, 2006	Canada	2007 Rugby World Cup Qualifier	Swilers Rugby Park; St. John's	
370	Blake Burdette	(Prop)	Sep 30, 2006	Uruguay	2007 Rugby World Cup Qualifier	Parque Central; Montevideo	
371	Ron Rosser	(Back row)	Sep 30, 2006	Uruguay	2007 Rugby World Cup Qualifier	Parque Central; Montevideo	
372	Mark Crick	Hooker	May 18, 2007	England A	2007 Churchill Cup	Edgeley Park; Edgeley	
373	Nese Malifa	Fly-half	May 18, 2007	England A	2007 Churchill Cup	Edgeley Park; Edgeley	
374	Pat Quinn	No. 8	May 18, 2007	England A	2007 Churchill Cup	Edgeley Park; Edgeley	
375	Chris Wyles	Wing	May 18, 2007	England A	2007 Churchill Cup	Edgeley Park; Edgeley	
376	Andrew Osborne	(Wing)	May 18, 2007	England A	2007 Churchill Cup	Edgeley Park; Edgeley	
377	Ben Wiedemer	(Flanker)	May 18, 2007	England A	2007 Churchill Cup	Edgeley Park; Edgeley	
378	Inaki Basauri Flores	(Flanker)	May 23, 2007	Scotland A	2007 Churchill Cup	Dry Leas; Henley-on-Thames	
379	Dan Payne	(Flanker)	May 23, 2007	Scotland A	2007 Churchill Cup	Dry Leas; Henley-on-Thames	
380	Henry Bloomfield	No. 8	Sep 8, 2007	England	2007 Rugby World Cup	Stade Felix Bollaert; Lens	
381	Taku Ngwenya	Wing	Sep 8, 2007	England	2007 Rugby World Cup	Stade Felix Bollaert; Lens	
382	Mate Moeakiola	(Prop)	Sep 8, 2007	England	2007 Rugby World Cup	Stade Felix Bollaert; Lens	
383	Thretton Palamo	(Wing)	Sep 30, 2007	South Africa	2007 Rugby World Cup	Stade de la Mosson; Montpellier	
384	Mike Petri	(Scrum-half)	Sep 30, 2007	South Africa	2007 Rugby World Cup	Stade de la Mosson; Montpellier	
385	Gavin DeBartolo	Wing	Jun 7, 2008	England A	2008 Churchill Cup	Lansdowne Stadium; Ottawa	
386	John van der Giessen	Lock	Jun 7, 2008	England A	2008 Churchill Cup	Lansdowne Stadium; Ottawa	
387	Brian Doyle	(No. 8)	Jun 7, 2008	England A	2008 Churchill Cup	Lansdowne Stadium; Ottawa	
388	Mone Laulaupeaalu	(Hooker)	Jun 7, 2008	England A	2008 Churchill Cup	Lansdowne Stadium; Ottawa	
389	Jason Lett	(Flanker)	Jun 7, 2008	England A	2008 Churchill Cup	Lansdowne Stadium; Ottawa	
390	Chad Slaby	(Prop)	Jun 7, 2008	England A	2008 Churchill Cup	Lansdowne Stadium; Ottawa	
391	Justin Boyd	Wing	Jun 11, 2008	Ireland A	2008 Churchill Cup	Richardson Stadium; Kingston	
392	Robbie Shaw	(Scrum-half)	Jun 11, 2008	Ireland A	2008 Churchill Cup	Richardson Stadium; Kingston	
393	Junior Sifa	Center	Nov 8, 2008	Uruguay	Test match	Rio Tinto Stadium; Sandy	
394	Hayden Smith	Lock	Nov 8, 2008	Uruguay	Test match	Rio Tinto Stadium; Sandy	
395	JJ Gagiano	(Back row)	Nov 8, 2008	Uruguay	Test match	Rio Tinto Stadium; Sandy	
396	Shawn Pittman	(Prop)	Nov 8, 2008	Uruguay	Test match	Rio Tinto Stadium; Sandy	
397	Andrew Suniula	Center	Nov 16, 2008	Japan	Test match	Mizuho Ground; Nagoya	
398	Joe Welch	(Hooker)	Nov 16, 2008	Japan	Test match	Mizuho Ground; Nagoya	
399	Brian LeMay	Prop	Nov 22, 2008	Japan	Test match	Prince Chichibu Memorial Stadium; Tokyo	
400	Courtney Mackay	(Lock)	Nov 22, 2008	Japan	Test match	Prince Chichibu Memorial Stadium; Tokyo	
401	Chris Biller	Hooker	May 31, 2009	Ireland	Test match	Buck Shaw Stadium; Santa Clara	
402	Peter Dahl	Flanker	May 31, 2009	Ireland	Test match	Buck Shaw Stadium; Santa Clara	
403	Nic Johnson	No. 8	May 31, 2009	Ireland	Test match	Buck Shaw Stadium; Santa Clara	
404	Will Johnson	Prop	May 31, 2009	Ireland	Test match	Buck Shaw Stadium; Santa Clara	
405	Roland Suniula	Center	May 31, 2009	Ireland	Test match	Buck Shaw Stadium; Santa Clara	
406	Kevin Swiryn	Wing	May 31, 2009	Ireland	Test match	Buck Shaw Stadium; Santa Clara	
407	Ata Malifa	(Fly-half)	May 31, 2009	Ireland	Test match	Buck Shaw Stadium; Santa Clara	
408	Tim Usasz	(Scrum-half)	May 31, 2009	Ireland	Test match	Buck Shaw Stadium; Santa Clara	
409	Brian McClenahan	(Hooker)	Jun 6, 2009	Wales	Test match	Toyota Park; Bridgeview	
410	Colin Hawley	Wing	Jun 21, 2009	Georgia	2009 Churchill Cup	Dick's Sporting Goods Park; Commerce City	
411	Phil Thiel	Hooker	Nov 14, 2009	Uruguay	2011 Rugby World Cup Qualifier	Estadio Charrúa; Montevideo	
412	Jake Sprague	(Prop)	Nov 14, 2009	Uruguay	2011 Rugby World Cup Qualifier	Estadio Charrúa; Montevideo	
413	Pat Danahy	(Lock)	Nov 21, 2009	Uruguay	2011 Rugby World Cup Qualifier	Broward County Park; Lauderhill	
414	Matt Hawkins	Flanker	Jun 5, 2010	Russia	2010 Churchill Cup	Infinity Park; Glendale	
415	Scott LaValla	Lock	Jun 5, 2010	Russia	2010 Churchill Cup	Infinity Park; Glendale	
416	Anthony Purpura	(Prop)	Jun 5, 2010	Russia	2010 Churchill Cup	Infinity Park; Glendale	
417	Volney Rouse	(Fly-half)	Jun 5, 2010	Russia	2010 Churchill Cup	Infinity Park; Glendale	
418	Seta Tuilevuka	Center	Nov 13, 2010	Portugal	Test match	Estádio Universitário de Lisboa; Lisbon	
419	Samu Manoa	Lock	Nov 27, 2010	Georgia	Test match	National Stadium; Tbilisi	
420	Tai Enosa	(Center)	Jun 8, 2011	Tonga	2011 Churchill Cup	Pillar Data Arena; Esher	
421	Eric Fry	(Prop)	Jun 8, 2011	Tonga	2011 Churchill Cup	Pillar Data Arena; Esher	
422	Troy Hall	(Fly-half)	Jun 8, 2011	Tonga	2011 Churchill Cup	Pillar Data Arena; Esher	
423	Blaine Scully	Full-back	Jun 8, 2011	Russia	2011 Churchill Cup	Sixways Stadium; Worcester	
424	James Paterson	Wing	Aug 21, 2011	Japan	Test match	Prince Chichibu Memorial Stadium; Tokyo	
425	Ryan Chapman	(Back row)	Aug 21, 2011	Japan	Test match	Prince Chichibu Memorial Stadium; Tokyo	
426	Andrew Durutalo	Flanker	Jun 9, 2012	Canada	Test match	Richardson Stadium; Kingston	
427	Will Holder	Fly-half	Jun 9, 2012	Canada	Test match	Richardson Stadium; Kingston	
428	Luke Hume	Wing	Jun 9, 2012	Canada	Test match	Richardson Stadium; Kingston	
429	Taylor Mokate	(Flanker)	Jun 9, 2012	Canada	Test match	Richardson Stadium; Kingston	
430	Derek Asbun	(Hooker)	Jun 16, 2012	Georgia	Test match	Infinity Park; Glendale	
431	Shaun Davies	(Scrum-half)	Jun 16, 2012	Georgia	Test match	Infinity Park; Glendale	
432	Tolifili Liufau	(Prop)	Jun 16, 2012	Georgia	Test match	Infinity Park; Glendale	
433	Cornelius Dirksen	Wing	Nov 9, 2012	Russia	2012 International Rugby Series	Eirias Stadium; Colwyn Bay	
434	Toby L'Estrange	Fly-half	Nov 9, 2012	Russia	2012 International Rugby Series	Eirias Stadium; Colwyn Bay	
435	John Quill	Flanker	Nov 9, 2012	Russia	2012 International Rugby Series	Eirias Stadium; Colwyn Bay	
436	Zach Fenoglio	(Prop)	Nov 9, 2012	Russia	2012 International Rugby Series	Eirias Stadium; Colwyn Bay	
437	Zachary Pangelinan	Full-back	Nov 17, 2012	Tonga	2012 International Rugby Series	Eirias Stadium; Colwyn Bay	
438	Graham Harriman	(Lock)	Nov 24, 2012	Romania	Test match	Stadionul Arcul de Triumf; Bucharest	
439	Adam Siddall	Full-back	May 25, 2013	Canada	2013 Pacific Nations Cup	Ellerslie Rugby Park; Edmonton	
440	Seamus Kelly	(Center)	May 25, 2013	Canada	2013 Pacific Nations Cup	Ellerslie Rugby Park; Edmonton	
441	Liam Murphy	(Flanker)	May 25, 2013	Canada	2013 Pacific Nations Cup	Ellerslie Rugby Park; Edmonton	
442	Nick Wallace	(Prop)	Jun 14, 2013	Tonga	2013 Pacific Nations Cup	Home Depot Center; Carson, California	
443	Cam Dolan	No. 8	Jun 19, 2013	Fiji	2013 Pacific Nations Cup	Mizuho Ground; Nagoya	
444	Titi Lamositele	(Prop)	Aug 17, 2013	Canada	2015 Rugby World Cup Qualifier	Blackbaud Stadium; Charleston	
445	Folau Niua	(Fly-half)	Aug 17, 2013	Canada	2015 Rugby World Cup Qualifier	Blackbaud Stadium; Charleston	
446	Tim Maupin	Wing	Nov 16, 2013	Georgia	Test match	Rustavi	
447	Olive Kilifi	(Prop)	Nov 16, 2013	Georgia	Test match	Rustavi	
448	Tai Tuisamoa	Lock	Nov 23, 2013	Russia	Test match	Allianz Park; London	
449	Tom Coolican	(Hooker)	Mar 22, 2014	Uruguay	2015 Rugby World Cup Qualifier	Estadio Charrúa; Montevideo	
450	Kyle Sumsion	(Flanker)	Mar 22, 2014	Uruguay	2015 Rugby World Cup Qualifier	Estadio Charrúa; Montevideo	
451	Shalom Suniula	(Hooker)	Mar 22, 2014	Uruguay	2015 Rugby World Cup Qualifier	Estadio Charrúa; Montevideo	
452	Danny Barrett	(Lock)	Jun 7, 2014	Scotland	Test match	BBVA Compass Stadium; Houston	
453	Chad London	(Flanker)	Jun 7, 2014	Scotland	Test match	BBVA Compass Stadium; Houston	
454	Brett Thompson	Wing	Jun 21, 2014	Canada	2014 Pacific Nations Cup	Cal Expo Field; Sacramento	
455	Tim Stanfill	(Wing)	Nov 1, 2014	New Zealand	Test match	Soldier Field; Chicago	
456	Matt Trouville	No. 8	Nov 8, 2014	Romania	Test match	Stadionul Arcul de Triumf; Bucharest	
457	John Cullen	(Lock)	Nov 8, 2014	Romania	Test match	Stadionul Arcul de Triumf; Bucharest	
458	Greg Peterson	(Lock)	Nov 8, 2014	Romania	Test match	Stadionul Arcul de Triumf; Bucharest	
459	Ben Tarr	(Prop)	Nov 8, 2014	Romania	Test match	Stadionul Arcul de Triumf; Bucharest	
460	Ronnie McLean	Full-back	Nov 21, 2014	Fiji	Test match	Stade de la Rabine; Vannes	
461	AJ MacGinty	Fly-half	Jul 18, 2015	Samoa	2015 Pacific Nations Cup	Avaya Stadium; San Jose	
462	Zack Test	(Wing)	Jul 18, 2015	Samoa	2015 Pacific Nations Cup	Avaya Stadium; San Jose	
463	Al McFarland	(No. 8)	Jul 24, 2015	Japan	2015 Pacific Nations Cup	Cal Expo Field; Sacramento	
464	Chris Baumann	Prop	Jul 29, 2015	Tonga	2015 Pacific Nations Cup	BMO Field; Toronto	
465	Niku Kruger	(Scrum-half)	Aug 22, 2015	Canada	Test match	Twin Elm Rugby Park; Nepean	
466	Joe Taufeteʻe	(Hooker)	Oct 7, 2015	South Africa	2015 Rugby World Cup	Olympic Stadium; London	
467	Jake Anderson	Full-back	Feb 13, 2016	Canada	2016 Americas Rugby Championship	Dell Diamond; Round Rock	
468	James Bird	Fly-half	Feb 13, 2016	Canada	2016 Americas Rugby Championship	Dell Diamond; Round Rock	
469	Nate Brakeley	Flanker	Feb 13, 2016	Canada	2016 Americas Rugby Championship	Dell Diamond; Round Rock	
470	LeMoto Filikitonga	Center	Feb 13, 2016	Canada	2016 Americas Rugby Championship	Dell Diamond; Round Rock	
471	Ben Landry	Lock	Feb 13, 2016	Canada	2016 Americas Rugby Championship	Dell Diamond; Round Rock	
472	Kingsley McGowan	Wing	Feb 13, 2016	Canada	2016 Americas Rugby Championship	Dell Diamond; Round Rock	
473	Brodie Orth	Lock	Feb 13, 2016	Canada	2016 Americas Rugby Championship	Dell Diamond; Round Rock	
474	Mike Sosene-Feagai	Hooker	Feb 13, 2016	Canada	2016 Americas Rugby Championship	Dell Diamond; Round Rock	
475	David Tameilau	No. 8	Feb 13, 2016	Canada	2016 Americas Rugby Championship	Dell Diamond; Round Rock	
476	Mike Te'o	Scrum-half	Feb 13, 2016	Canada	2016 Americas Rugby Championship	Dell Diamond; Round Rock	
477	JP Eloff	(Fly-half)	Feb 13, 2016	Canada	2016 Americas Rugby Championship	Dell Diamond; Round Rock	
478	Michael Garrity	(Center)	Feb 13, 2016	Canada	2016 Americas Rugby Championship	Dell Diamond; Round Rock	
479	Alec Gletzer	(Flanker)	Feb 13, 2016	Canada	2016 Americas Rugby Championship	Dell Diamond; Round Rock	
480	James Hilterbrand	(Front Row)	Feb 13, 2016	Canada	2016 Americas Rugby Championship	Dell Diamond; Round Rock	
481	Tom Bliss	Scrum-half	Feb 20, 2016	Chile	2016 Americas Rugby Championship	Lockhart Stadium; Fort Lauderdale	
482	Nick Edwards	Wing	Feb 20, 2016	Chile	2016 Americas Rugby Championship	Lockhart Stadium; Fort Lauderdale	
483	Lorenzo Thomas	Center	Feb 20, 2016	Chile	2016 Americas Rugby Championship	Lockhart Stadium; Fort Lauderdale	
484	Demecus Beach	(Prop)	Feb 20, 2016	Chile	2016 Americas Rugby Championship	Lockhart Stadium; Fort Lauderdale	
485	Pat Blair	(No. 8)	Feb 20, 2016	Chile	2016 Americas Rugby Championship	Lockhart Stadium; Fort Lauderdale	
486	Ryan Matyas	(Full-back)	Feb 20, 2016	Chile	2016 Americas Rugby Championship	Lockhart Stadium; Fort Lauderdale	
487	James King	Flanker	Feb 27, 2016	Brazil	2016 Americas Rugby Championship	Athletic Club; São Paulo	
488	Aladdin Schirmer	Flanker	Feb 27, 2016	Brazil	2016 Americas Rugby Championship	Athletic Club; São Paulo	
489	Hanco Germishuys	(Flanker)	Feb 27, 2016	Brazil	2016 Americas Rugby Championship	Athletic Club; São Paulo	
490	Deion Mikesell	Wing	Mar 5, 2016	Uruguay	2016 Americas Rugby Championship	Estadio Charrúa; Montevideo	
491	Nate Augspurger	Scrum-half	Jun 18, 2016	Italy	Test match	Avaya Stadium; San Jose	
492	Tony Lamborn	(Lock)	Jun 18, 2016	Italy	Test match	Avaya Stadium; San Jose	
493	Angus MacLellan II	(Prop)	Jun 18, 2016	Italy	Test match	Avaya Stadium; San Jose	
494	Langilangi Haupeakui	(Flanker)	Jun 25, 2016	Russia	Test match	Cal Expo Field; Sacramento	
495	Harry Higgins	(Lock)	Jun 18, 2016	Russia	Test match	Cal Expo Field; Sacramento	
496	Stephen Tomasin	(Scrum-half)	Jun 18, 2016	Russia	Test match	Cal Expo Field; Sacramento	
497	Bryce Campbell	Center	Nov 12, 2016	Romania	Test match	Stadionul Arcul de Triumf; Bucharest	
498	Nick Civetta	Lock	Nov 12, 2016	Romania	Test match	Stadionul Arcul de Triumf; Bucharest	
499	Madison Hughes	Full-back	Nov 12, 2016	Romania	Test match	Stadionul Arcul de Triumf; Bucharest	
500	Martin Iosefo	Wing	Nov 12, 2016	Romania	Test match	Stadionul Arcul de Triumf; Bucharest	
501	Matai Leuta	(Full-back)	Nov 12, 2016	Romania	Test match	Stadionul Arcul de Triumf; Bucharest	
502	Dino Waldren	(Prop)	Nov 12, 2016	Romania	Test match	Stadionul Arcul de Triumf; Bucharest	
503	Marcel Brache	Center	Nov 19, 2016	Tonga	Test match	Anoeta Stadium; San Sebastián	
504	Ben Cima	Fly-half	Feb 4, 2017	Uruguay	2017 Americas Rugby Championship	Toyota Field; San Antonio	
505	Peter Malcolm	Hooker	Feb 4, 2017	Uruguay	2017 Americas Rugby Championship	Toyota Field; San Antonio	
506	Matt Jensen	(Lock)	Feb 4, 2017	Uruguay	2017 Americas Rugby Championship	Toyota Field; San Antonio	
507	Will Magie	(Fly-half)	Feb 4, 2017	Uruguay	2017 Americas Rugby Championship	Toyota Field; San Antonio	
508	Alex Maughan	(Prop)	Feb 4, 2017	Uruguay	2017 Americas Rugby Championship	Toyota Field; San Antonio	
509	Spike Davis	Wing	Feb 11, 2017	Brazil	2017 Americas Rugby Championship	Dell Diamond; Round Rock	
510	Peter Tiberio	(Wing)	Feb 11, 2017	Brazil	2017 Americas Rugby Championship	Dell Diamond; Round Rock	
511	Siaosi Mahoni	(Lock)	Feb 18, 2017	Canada	2017 Americas Rugby Championship	Swangard Stadium; Burnaby	
512	Andrew Turner	(Scrum-half)	Feb 25, 2017	Chile	2017 Americas Rugby Championship	Estadio San Carlos de Apoquindo; Las Condes	
513	Calvin Whiting	(Center)	Feb 25, 2017	Chile	2017 Americas Rugby Championship	Estadio San Carlos de Apoquindo; Las Condes	
514	Paddy Ryan	(Prop)	Jun 10, 2017	Ireland	Test match	Red Bull Arena; Harrison	
515	Huluholo Moungaloa	(Prop)	Nov 18, 2017	Germany	Test match	Brita-Arena; Wiesbaden	
516	Dylan Audsley	Center	Feb 10, 2018	Canada	2018 Americas Rugby Championship	Cal Expo Field; Sacramento	
517	Will Hooley	(Fly-half)	Feb 10, 2018	Canada	2018 Americas Rugby Championship	Cal Expo Field; Sacramento	
518	Josh Whippy	(Wing)	Feb 10, 2018	Canada	2018 Americas Rugby Championship	Cal Expo Field; Sacramento	
519	Psalm Wooching	Flanker	Feb 17, 2018	Chile	2018 Americas Rugby Championship	Titan Stadium; Fullerton	
520	Malon Al-Jiboori	(Flanker)	Feb 17, 2018	Chile	2018 Americas Rugby Championship	Titan Stadium; Fullerton	
521	Brendan Daly	(Lock)	Feb 17, 2018	Chile	2018 Americas Rugby Championship	Titan Stadium; Fullerton	
522	Ruben de Haas	(Scrum-half)	Feb 17, 2018	Chile	2018 Americas Rugby Championship	Titan Stadium; Fullerton	
523	Dylan Fawsitt	(Hooker)	Feb 17, 2018	Chile	2018 Americas Rugby Championship	Titan Stadium; Fullerton	
524	Paul Lasike	(Wing)	Feb 17, 2018	Chile	2018 Americas Rugby Championship	Titan Stadium; Fullerton	
525	Paul Mullen	Prop	Jun 9, 2018	Russia	Test match	Dick's Sporting Goods Park; Commerce City	
526	Vili Tolutaʻu	(Flanker)	Jun 23, 2018	Canada	Test match	Wanderers Grounds; Halifax	
527	Gannon Moore	Wing	Nov 10, 2018	Samoa	Test match	Anoeta Stadium; San Sebastián	
528	David Ainuʻu	(Prop)	Nov 10, 2018	Samoa	Test match	Anoeta Stadium; San Sebastián	
529	Devereaux Ferris	(Scrum-half)	Nov 10, 2018	Samoa	Test match	Anoeta Stadium; San Sebastián	
530	Nick Boyer	(Scrum-half)	Nov 17, 2018	Romania	Test match	Stadionul Ghencea II; Bucharest	
531	Chance Wenglewski	(Prop)	Nov 24, 2018	Ireland	Test match	Aviva Stadium; Dublin	
532	Tadhg Leader	(Fly-half)	Feb 2, 2019	Chile	2019 Americas Rugby Championship	Estadio Santiago Bueras; Maipu	
533	Kapeli Pifeleti	(Prop)	Feb 23, 2019	Brazil	2019 Americas Rugby Championship	Dell Diamond; Round Rock	
534	Jamason Faʻanana-Schultz	(Flanker)	Jul 27, 2019	Canada	2019 Americas Rugby Championship	Infinity Park; Glendale	
535	Ben Pinkelman	(No. 8)	Aug 3, 2019	Samoa	2019 Americas Rugby Championship	Infinity Park; Glendale	
536	Luke Carty	(Fly-half)	Jul 4, 2021	England	Test match	Twickenham Stadium; Twickenham	
537	Riekert Hattingh	(Flanker)	Jul 4, 2021	England	Test match	Twickenham Stadium; Twickenham	
538	Mika Kruse	(Center)	Jul 4, 2021	England	Test match	Twickenham Stadium; Twickenham	
539	Michael Baska	(Scrum-half)	Jul 4, 2021	England	Test match	Twickenham Stadium; Twickenham	
540	Christian Dyer	(Full-back)	Jul 4, 2021	England	Test match	Twickenham Stadium; Twickenham	
541	Matt Harmon	(Prop)	Jul 4, 2021	England	Test match	Twickenham Stadium; Twickenham	
542	Andrew Guerra	(Flanker)	Jul 10, 2021	Ireland	Test match	Aviva Stadium; Dublin	
543	Tavite Lopeti	(Center)	Sep 4, 2021	Canada	2023 Rugby World Cup Qualifier	Swiler’s Rugby Park; St. John's	
544	Mike Dabulas	(Full-back)	Sep 11, 2021	Canada	Test match	Infinity Park; Glendale, Colorado	
545	Moni Tongaʻuiha	(Flanker)	Oct 2, 2021	Uruguay	2023 Rugby World Cup Qualifier	Infinity Park; Glendale, Colorado	
546	Benjamín Bonasso	(Flanker)	Oct 9, 2021	Uruguay	2023 Rugby World Cup Qualifier	Estadio Charrúa; Montevideo	
547	Ryan James	(Wing)	Oct 23, 2021	New Zealand	Test match	FedExField; Washington, D.C.	
548	Chad Gough	(Hooker)	Oct 23, 2021	New Zealand	Test match	FedExField; Washington, D.C.	
549	Fakaʻosi Pifeleti	(Prop)	Oct 23, 2021	New Zealand	Test match	FedExField; Washington, D.C.	
550	Jason Damm		Jul 9, 2022	Chile		Estadio Santa Laura-Universidad SEK, Santiago	
551	Cory Daniel		Nov 6, 2022	Kenya		The Sevens Stadium, Dubai	
552	Vili Helu		Nov 6, 2022	Kenya		The Sevens Stadium, Dubai	
553	Jack Iscaro		Nov 6, 2022	Kenya		The Sevens Stadium, Dubai	
554	Ryan Rees		Nov 6, 2022	Kenya		The Sevens Stadium, Dubai	
555	Mitch Wilson		Nov 6, 2022	Kenya		The Sevens Stadium, Dubai	
556	Nathan Sylvia		Nov 6, 2022	Kenya		The Sevens Stadium, Dubai	
557	Tommaso Boni		Aug 5, 2023	Romania		Stadionul Arcul de Triumf, Bucharest	
558	Sam Golla		Aug 5, 2023	Romania		Stadionul Arcul de Triumf, Bucharest	
559	Nick McCarthy		Aug 5, 2023	Romania		Stadionul Arcul de Triumf, Bucharest	
560	Paddy Ryan		Aug 5, 2023	Romania		Stadionul Arcul de Triumf, Bucharest	
561	Luke White		Aug 5, 2023	Romania		Stadionul Arcul de Triumf, Bucharest	
562	Chris Mattina		Aug 5, 2023	Romania		Stadionul Arcul de Triumf, Bucharest	
563	Thomas Tu'avao		Aug 5, 2023	Romania		Stadionul Arcul de Triumf, Bucharest	
564	Jake Turnbull		Aug 5, 2023	Romania		Stadionul Arcul de Triumf, Bucharest	
565	Takaji Young Yen		Aug 5, 2023	Romania		Stadionul Arcul de Triumf, Bucharest	
566	Kaleb Geiger		Aug 12, 2023	Portugal		Estádio Algarve, São João da Venda	
567	Lauina Futi		Aug 12, 2023	Portugal		Estádio Algarve, São João da Venda	
568	Joe Mano		Nov 12, 2023	Brazil		Campo de El Pantano	
569	Dominic Besag		Nov 12, 2023	Brazil		Campo de El Pantano	
570	Bailey Wilson		Nov 19, 2023	Spain		Campo de El Pantano	
571	Juan-Philip Smith		Jul 5, 2024	Canada		Bridgeview	
572	Renger van Eerten		Jul 5, 2024	Canada		Bridgeview	
