= Jason Lett =

US international rugby union player

- Born: April 28, 1976 (age 50) Wairoa, New Zealand
- Height: 6 ft 1 in (185 cm)
- Weight: 215 lb (98 kg)
- School: Wairarapa College

Rugby union career
- Position: Flanker
Provincial / State sides
Years	Team	Apps	(Points)
1998–99	Counties Manukau	5	(0)
2000	Taranaki	2	(0)
International career
Years	Team	Apps	(Points)
2008	United States	3	(0)

Jason Lett (born April 28, 1976) is a New Zealand-born former international rugby union player.

== Biography ==
Lett was born in Wairoa and educated at Wairarapa College.

A flanker, Lett competed with Counties Manukau and Taranaki from 1998 to 2000, before continuing his career in the United States, where he played for the Boston Irish Wolfhounds. He was capped three times for the United States in the 2008 Churchill Cup, off the bench against England "A", then as the starting openside flanker against Ireland "A" and Canada. During his time in the United States, Lett was involved in coaching rugby at Boston College.

Lett is now settled on the Gold Coast in Australia.

== See also ==
- List of United States national rugby union players
