= Chad Slaby =

US international rugby union player

- School: J. K. Mullen High School
- University: University of Colorado Boulder

Rugby union career
- Position: Prop
International career
Years	Team	Apps	(Points)
2008	United States	2	(0)

Chad Slaby is an American former international rugby union player.

A Denver native, Slaby was educated at J. K. Mullen High School and the University of Colorado Boulder.

Slaby played for the Chicago Lions in the Super League and was capped twice as a prop for the United States, coming on off the bench against England "A" and Canada during the 2008 Churchill Cup. He also had stints playing rugby overseas, with Australian club Southern Beaches in 2009, and later SC 1880 Frankfurt in the German Bundesliga.

== See also ==
- List of United States national rugby union players
