= Bill LeClerc =

US international rugby union player

- Full name: Peter William LeClerc
- Born: September 20, 1961 (age 65) Whangārei, New Zealand
- Height: 6 ft 1 in (185 cm)
- Weight: 220 lb (100 kg)

Rugby union career
- Position: Prop
Provincial / State sides
Years	Team	Apps	(Points)
1985–90	Northland	89	(16)
International career
Years	Team	Apps	(Points)
1996–99	United States	12	(15)

Peter William LeClerc (born September 20, 1961) is a New Zealand-American former international rugby union player.

Born in Whangārei, New Zealand, LeClerc gained 16 caps playing as a prop on the United States national team from 1996 to 1999. He retired as a player in 2001 after winning a national title with the Gentlemen of Aspen.

LeClerc held his first coaching position when he was put in charge of San Francisco Golden Gate. He is a former scrum coach for the men's national team and has also served as an assistant coach with the women's national team.

Since 2011, LeClerc has been head coach of the Army women's team.

== See also ==
- List of United States national rugby union players
