= Marc L'Huillier =

US international rugby union player

- Born: September 26, 1971 (age 55) Chicago, United States
- Height: 5 ft 9 in (175 cm)
- Weight: 245 lb (111 kg)

Rugby union career
- Position: Prop
International career
Years	Team	Apps	(Points)
1999	United States	2	(0)

Marc L'Huillier (born March 1, 1971) is an American-born Australian former international rugby union player.

L'Huillier was born in Chicago, Illinois, to an Australian father and English mother. His father, Leon L'Huillier, was working in Chicago for McKinsey. Raised in Australia in Brisbane and Melbourne, L'Huillier played his rugby as a prop and was a Victorian state representative player, before joining Australia's most successful rugby club, Sydney University. He played 86 games of first grade for Sydney University.

An American passport holder, L'Huillier was invited to play for the United States national team in their tour match against Queensland when they visited Australia in 1999. He then traveled with the team to the UK and made his Test debut off the bench against England at Twickenham. Included in the squad for the 1999 Rugby World Cup, L'Huillier played in one of the three pool matches, against the Wallabies at Thomond Park in Limerick.

He retired from playing soon after the 1999 Rugby World Cup. Over the course of his rugby career, L'Huillier played against a range of International sides including South Africa, Australia, England, England A, Wales and Samoa.

In 2018, L'Huillier was recognised by his school, St Kevin's College in Melbourne, in the team of the century as part of the centennial celebrations.

Off the field, L'Huillier was the CEO and joint owner of one of Australia's largest market and consumer research firms, Sweeney Research. The firm was acquired by Ernst and Young (EY) in late 2014. L'Huillier was a Senior Partner at EY for over a decade.

== See also ==
- List of United States national rugby union players
