= Rob Randell =

US international rugby union player

- Full name: Robert Raihania Randell
- Born: April 8, 1967 (age 59) Hawke's Bay, New Zealand
- Height: 6 ft 4 in (193 cm)
- Weight: 240 lb (109 kg)
- School: Church College of New Zealand

Rugby union career
- Position: Lock
International career
Years	Team	Apps	(Points)
1993–97	United States	12	(0)

Robert Raihania Randell (born April 8, 1967) is a New Zealand-born American former international rugby union player.

Born in Hawke's Bay, Randell was educated at Church College, a Mormon private school in Hamilton. He represented New Zealand Secondary Schools in both rugby union and water polo, before moving to the United States. Randell is of Māori descent.

Randell, a lock, competed on the United States national team from 1993 to 1997, earning 12 caps. He played his club rugby in California for Old Blues and Belmont Shore. Settling in Utah, Randell has held several coaching positions since retiring, including working as a forwards coach for the Utah Warriors.

== See also ==
- List of United States national rugby union players
