= Bill Leversee =

US international rugby union player

- Full name: William Neil Leversee
- Born: June 2, 1964 (age 62) Van Nuys, CA, United States
- Height: 6 ft 3 in (191 cm)
- University: UC Santa Barbara

Rugby union career
- Position: Lock
International career
Years	Team	Apps	(Points)
1988–96	United States	15	(12)

William Neil Leversee (born June 2, 1964) is an American former international rugby union player.

Born in Van Nuys, California, Leversee grew up in La Cañada and began playing rugby in college with the Gauchos of UC Santa Barbara, where his nickname "Chief" was coined. He was a two-time All-American with the Gauchos.

Leversee, a 6 ft 3 in lock, played rugby in Natal, South Africa, while undertaking further tertiary studies and in 1994 became the first American to compete in Italy's top division when he joined Mirano.

Capped 15 times for the United States, Leversee scored a try on his debut match in 1988, helping the Americans to defeat Romania. He made the national squad for the 1991 Rugby World Cup and appeared in a pool match against Italy.

After rugby, Bill worked in various sales positions before joining Falcon West Insurance as a very successful insurance broker. He attributes much of his success to the sport of rugby and remains involved through coaching and mentoring younger players.

== See also ==
- List of United States national rugby union players
