= Cayo Nicolau =

US international rugby union player

- Full name: Cayo Simões Nicolau
- Born: September 24, 1977 (age 49) Belém, Brazil
- Height: 6 ft 3 in (191 cm)
- Weight: 215 lb (98 kg)

Rugby union career
- Position: Centre
International career
Years	Team	Apps	(Points)
2002–03	United States	4	(10)

Cayo Simões Nicolau (born September 24, 1977) is a Brazilian-born former international rugby union player.

== Rugby career ==
Born in Belém, Nicolau was a Brazil junior World Cup representative, recruited by Middle Tennessee State University after they spotted him at a rugby sevens tournament in Dallas. He joined the university in 1998 on a rugby scholarship.

Nicolau competed for the United States in 2002 and 2003. His first two appearances were off the bench and included a try against Japan in San Francisco during the 2003 Super Cup. He gained a further two caps in the 2003 Churchill Cup, as starting fly-half in their over Canada, then as a centre against England "A", scoring a try in the latter.

== See also ==
- List of United States national rugby union players
