= Mark Pidcock =

US international rugby union player

- Full name: Mark David Pidcock
- Born: October 31, 1961 (age 65) Great Falls, Montana, U.S.
- School: Charles M. Russell High School
- University: Oregon State University

Rugby union career
- Position: Scrum-half
International career
| Years | Team | Apps | (Points) |
| 1991 | United States | 3 | (0) |

Mark David Pidcock (born October 31, 1961) is an American former international rugby union player.

Born and raised in Great Falls, Montana, Pidcock was educated at Charles M. Russell High School.

Pidcock was a football quarterback who switched to rugby union while at Oregon State University and in 1985 became the first ever Beaver selected on the west coast's representative team the Grizzlies.

A navy pilot, Pidcock played scrum-half for the United States at the 1991 Rugby World Cup, featuring in matches against the All Blacks in Gloucester and host nation England at Twickenham.

Pidcock competed for San Diego club Old Mission Beach.

== See also ==
- List of United States national rugby union players
