= James Lik =

American athlete (1977–2022)

- Full name: James Henry Lik
- Born: April 20, 1977 New Hyde Park, New York
- Died: April 3, 2022 (aged 44)
- Height: 6 ft 7 in (201 cm)
- Weight: 250 lb (113 kg)
- School: New Hyde Park High School
- University: Wake Forest University

Rugby union career
- Position: Lock
International career
Years	Team	Apps	(Points)
2005	United States	3	(0)

James Henry Lik (April 20, 1977 – April 3, 2022) was an American college football and rugby union player.

== Biography ==
Born in New Hyde Park on Long Island, Lik was an all-round sportsman at New Hyde Park Memorial High School, playing basketball, baseball and football. He was a Division 1 football tight end with Wake Forest from 1996 to 1999.

Lik, a 6 ft 7 in lock, played his rugby in Manhattan and in 2005 got his first call up to the U.S. national team, for the Super Cup in Japan, where he appeared in internationals against Canada and Romania.

== See also ==
- List of United States national rugby union players
