= Bill Shiflet =

US international rugby union player (born 1954)

- Full name: William Shiflet
- Born: July 22, 1954 (age 72)
- Height: 6 ft 5 in (196 cm)
- Weight: 250 lb (113 kg)
- School: Cordova High School
- University: UC Berkeley

Rugby union career
- Position: Lock
International career
Years	Team	Apps	(Points)
1983–87	United States	4	(0)

William Shiflet (born July 22, 1954) is an American former international rugby union player.

A football defensive lineman in his youth, Shiflet attended Cordova High School and took up a football scholarship to the University of California, Berkeley. He later played semi-professional football for the Sacramento Buffalos.

Shiflet was a second-row forward in rugby and played for the Sacramento Capitals, which he joined in 1978. A member of the US national team in the 1980s, Shiflet was capped four times, playing as a lock. He toured Australia in 1983 and again in 1987 for the Rugby World Cup, where he came off injured in the match against the Wallabies in Brisbane.

== See also ==
- List of United States national rugby union players
