= Butch Horwath =

US international rugby union player

- Full name: Frank Horwath
- Born: 1955 (age 70–71)
- Height: 5 ft 10 in (178 cm)
- Weight: 222 lb (101 kg)
- School: Liberty High School
- University: West Chester State College

Rugby union career
- Position: Prop
International career
Years	Team	Apps	(Points)
1984–90	United States	7	(0)

Frank "Butch" Horwath (born 1955) is an American former international rugby union player.

Horwath grew up in Bethlehem, Pennsylvania, and attended Liberty High School, where he competed in football and wrestling, before picking up rugby at West Chester State College.

A prop, Horwath made his international debut for the United States against Canada in 1984. He made the squad for the 1987 Rugby World Cup and featured in one match, a loss to host country Australia in Brisbane. After two years of retirement, Horwath made a brief international comeback in 1990 and finished his career with seven Eagles caps. He played his club rugby with Philadelphia Whitemarsh.

== See also ==
- List of United States national rugby union players
