= Richard Liddington =

US international rugby union player

- Born: December 30, 1978 (age 47) Stoke-on-Trent, England, United Kingdom
- Height: 6 ft 1 in (185 cm)
- Weight: 257 lb (117 kg)

Rugby union career
- Position: Prop
International career
Years	Team	Apps	(Points)
2003–04	United States	5	(5)

Richard Liddington (born December 30, 1978) is a British-American former professional rugby union player.

Liddington was born in Stoke-on-Trent and attended Northampton School for Boys.

A prop, Liddington qualified to represent the United States through his mother, a Texan. He was capped a total of five-times for the United States, including one match at the 2003 Rugby World Cup in Australia, as a substitute against Scotland in Brisbane. During his career, Liddington played for several European teams, including Stade Francais, Exeter, London Welsh and Lansdowne. He appeared for Middlesex at county level.

== See also ==
- List of United States national rugby union players
