= Doug Rowe (rugby union) =

US international rugby union player

- Born: July 30, 1976 (age 50) New York, United States
- Height: 5 ft 9 in (175 cm)
- Weight: 168 lb (76 kg)
- School: Wellington College
- University: University of Edinburgh; Hughes Hall, Cambridge

Rugby union career
- Position: Scrum-half
International career
Years	Team	Apps	(Points)
2005	United States	2	(0)

Doug Rowe (born July 30, 1976) is an American former international rugby union player.

Born to British parents in New York, Rowe was educated at Wellington College, Berkshire. He completed an MBA at the University of Cambridge, gaining blues as a scrum-half in the 2008 and 2009 Varsity matches.

Rowe played his rugby in the United States with Denver Barbarians and New York club Old Blue. He was capped twice by the U.S. national team in 2005, for matches against Romania and Wales.

== See also ==
- List of United States national rugby union players
