= Norm Mottram =

US international rugby union player

- Full name: Norman James Mottram
- Born: June 30, 1959 (age 67) Glasgow, Scotland
- Height: 6 ft 3 in (191 cm)
- Weight: 244 lb (111 kg)
- University: University of Glasgow; University of Denver
- Occupation: Business executive

Rugby union career
- Position: Prop
International career
Years	Team	Apps	(Points)
1990–92	United States	9	(0)

Norman James Mottram (born June 30, 1959) is a Scottish-born American former international rugby union player.

Born in Glasgow, Mottram was a tighthead prop who played his rugby in his native Scotland until relocating to the United States in the mid-1980s, where he linked up with Colorado club Boulder RFC.

Mottram gained nine international caps competing for the United States during the early 1990s and was a member of the team at the 1991 Rugby World Cup, playing matches against the All Blacks and England.

== See also ==
- List of United States national rugby union players
