= Cliff Vogl =

American rugby union player

- Full name: Clifton Vogl
- Born: January 4, 1969 (age 57) Karlsruhe, West Germany
- Height: 6 ft 5 in (196 cm)
- Weight: 240 lb (109 kg)
- School: Brown Deer High School

Rugby union career
- Position: Lock
Provincial / State sides
Years	Team	Apps	(Points)
1996	King Country	5	(0)
International career
Years	Team	Apps	(Points)
1996–98	United States	12	(0)

Clifton Vogl (born 4 January 1969) is an American former international rugby union player.

Raised in Milwaukee, Wisconsin, Vogl was educated at Brown Deer High School and played basketball growing up.

Vogl was a lock on the United States national team between 1996 and 1998, gaining 12 caps.

A former U.S. serviceman, Vogl played in the United Kingdom with London Welsh and Bridgend. He also spent a season in New Zealand with Otorohanga and represented provincial side King Country.

== See also ==
- List of United States national rugby union players
