= Tom Vinick =

US international rugby union player

- Born: December 27, 1956 (age 69)
- School: Conard High School
- University: Boston University
- Occupation: Chiropractor

Rugby union career
- Position: Center
International career
Years	Team	Apps	(Points)
1986–87	United States	3	(0)

Tom Vinick (born December 27, 1956) is an American former international rugby union player.

A native of Connecticut, Vinick was a back with a game that combined speed and power. He picked up rugby union during his senior year at Conard High School, making the first XV of the Hartford Wanderers his first season.

Vinick made his first capped appearance for the United States in 1986, as a center in a match against Canada in Tucson, Arizona. The following year, Vinick was selected on the U.S. team for the 1987 Rugby World Cup in Australia, where he featured in two pool matches, against the host country in Brisbane and England in Sydney.

== See also ==
- List of United States national rugby union players
