= Rob Lumkong =

US international rugby union player

- Full name: Robert Anthony Lumkong
- Born: August 3, 1970 (age 56) Trinidad and Tobago
- Height: 6 ft 2 in (188 cm)
- Weight: 220 lb (100 kg)

Rugby union career
- Position: No. 8 / Flanker
Senior career
Years	Team	Apps	(Points)
1997	Pontypridd	4	
International career
Years	Team	Apps	(Points)
1994–99	United States	29	(20)

Robert Anthony Lumkong (born August 3, 1970) is an American former international rugby union player.

Born in Trinidad and Tobago, Lumkong was primarily a number eight and played varsity rugby for the University of California Golden Bears, after picking up the sport growing up in the Caribbean country. He won a National Collegiate Club Championship with the Golden Bears and also played rugby in Berkeley with the Old Blues club.

Lumkong, who had a stint with Welsh club Pontypridd, competed in the United States national team between 1994 and 1999. He was capped 29 times in total and featured twice at the 1999 Rugby World Cup, including a match against eventual champions Australia in Limerick, which would be his final Eagles appearance.

== See also ==
- List of United States national rugby union players
