= Blane Warhurst =

US international rugby union player (born 1951)

- Born: September 28, 1951 (age 75)
- University: UC Berkeley

Rugby union career
- Position: Flanker
International career
Years	Team	Apps	(Points)
1983–87	United States	9	(8)

Blane Warhurst (born September 28, 1951) is an American former international rugby union player.

Warhurst was a running back on the UC Berkeley football team of the early 1970s, in addition to playing varsity rugby. He captained Berkeley rugby side Old Blues and got his first United States call up in 1983, for which he played as a flanker. In 1987, Warhurst made the national squad for the Rugby World Cup, where he featured in the pool match against Japan.

From 1999 to 2015, Warhurst coached rugby at Hayward High School.

Warhurst was a 2022 inductee into the US Rugby Hall of Fame.

== See also ==
- List of United States national rugby union players
