= Jesse Coulson =

US international rugby union player

- Born: January 6, 1977 (age 49) Auckland, New Zealand
- Height: 5 ft 9 in (175 cm)
- Weight: 185 lb (84 kg)
- School: Eastbourne College

Rugby union career
- Position: Scrum-half
International career
Years	Team	Apps	(Points)
1999	United States	1	(0)

Jesse Coulson (born January 6, 1977) is a New Zealand-born former international rugby union player.

Coulson was born to an American mother in Auckland. His father, New Zealand musician Clive Coulson, was a tour manager with Led Zeppelin, whose lead singer Robert Plant is Jesse's godfather.

Educated at Eastbourne College, Coulson was uncapped at international level when called up to Jack Clark's United States squad for the 1999 Rugby World Cup, as the back up to scrum-half Kevin Dalzell. He came on off the bench in their final pool match against the Wallabies at Thomond Park, Limerick, to play opposite George Gregan, in what would be his only appearance for the United States.

Coulson was a rugby coach at St Benedict's School, Ealing, then served as head of sport and rugby at Harrow School between 2008 and 2017, helping to produce future England internationals Maro Itoje and Billy Vunipola.

== See also ==
- List of United States national rugby union players
