= Joseph McKim =

American rugby union player (b. 1891)

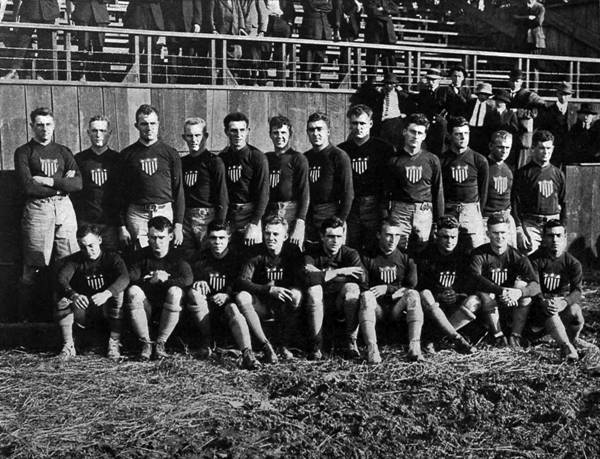
- McKim with the US team in 1912 (pictured front row, third from left)
- Full name: Joseph Louis McKim
- Born: August 25, 1891 Los Refugios, Sonora, Mexico
- Died: July 25, 1965 (aged 73) San Diego, California
- School: Pomona High School
- University: University of California

Rugby union career
- Position: Prop
Amateur team(s)
Years	Team	Apps	(Points)
1910–c. 1914	University of California		
- Correct as of October 2, 2018
International career
Years	Team	Apps	(Points)
1912–1913	United States	2	(0)
- Correct as of October 2, 2018

Joseph Louis "Chalk" McKim (August 25, 1891 – July 25, 1965) was a Mexican-born American rugby union player who played prop for the United States men's national team in its first two capped matches in 1912 and 1913.

== Biography ==
McKim was born on August 25, 1891, in Los Refugios, Sonora, Mexico, the only son of John Harmon McKim and Pastoria McKim (born Caranza). McKim's mother died in 1896, and McKim later moved to an Imperial Valley ranch with his father, as his father made a career transition from silver mining to farming.

McKim attended Pomona High School, where he played rugby, captaining the team during his senior year, and excelled in track and field, competing in hurdles, pole vault, high jump, shot put, and long jump. After graduating high school, McKim attended the University of California, where he studied agriculture, and gained the nickname, "Chalk." As a freshman, he was featured in a newspaper article, under the pseudonym C.H.A. McKim, in which his physique was described as "physically perfect" and "like [a] Greek statue." Beginning with his sophomore season, McKim played with the University of California's varsity rugby team for three years, serving as team captain in his final year.

On November 16, 1912, McKim played for the United States at prop in its first capped match—a 12–8 loss to Australia. On November 15, 1913, McKim also played for the United States at prop in its first test match against New Zealand. In November 1914, McKim also played in an uncapped match for the Americans against Barbarian F.C.

Later in life, McKim would marry Grace Holdzkom, with whom he had three children. He lived with his family at the Imperial Valley ranch where he had been raised. McKim died on July 25, 1965, in San Diego, California.
