= Deke Gard =

American rugby union player

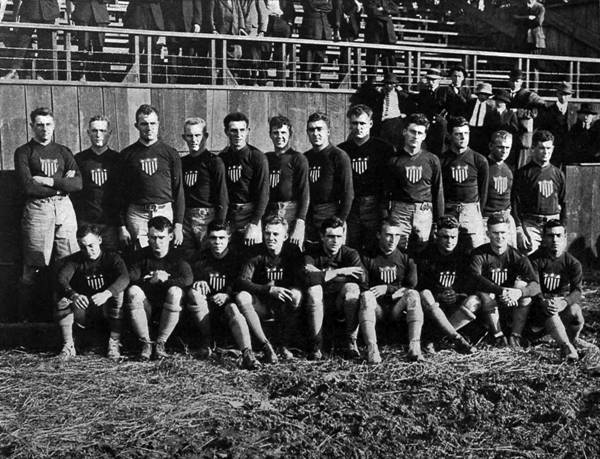
- Gard with the US team in 1912 (pictured back row, sixth from left)
- Full name: Frank Jacob Gard
- Born: March 27, 1892 Tremont City, Ohio, U.S.
- Died: September 27, 1918 (aged 26) Argonne Forest, France
- University: Stanford University

Rugby union career
- Position: Flanker
Amateur team(s)
Years	Team	Apps	(Points)
1910–1914	Stanford University		
- Correct as of June 26, 2018
International career
Years	Team	Apps	(Points)
1911–1913	United States	2	(0)
- Correct as of June 26, 2018

Frank Jacob "Deke" Gard (March 27, 1892 – September 27, 1918) was an American rugby union player who played flanker for the United States men's national team in its first two capped matches in 1912 and 1913.

== Early life and university years ==
Gard was born on March 27, 1892, in Tremont City, Ohio, the eldest child of Emerson Earl Gard and Laura E. Gard (born Shanley). Gard moved with his family from Ohio to Glendora, California, in 1905 and attended Citrus Union High School, from which he graduated in 1910. Gard attended Stanford University from 1910 until 1914 and graduated in May 1914 with a degree in chemistry. While at Stanford, Gard played for the rugby team, serving as the team's captain during the 1914 season. During his senior season, Gard was described as "one of [the] best forwards on the [West] coast." He also was a three-time varsity letter-winner for the school's track and field team, running in the 440-yard dash and in relays.

== International rugby career ==
Beginning in 1911, Gard played for the United States national rugby union team. On November 16, 1912, Gard played for the United States at flanker in its first capped match—a 12–8 loss to Australia. On November 15, 1913, Gard also played for the United States at flanker in its first test match against New Zealand. Gard served as captain in this match—a 51–3 defeat.

== Military service and death ==
On June 13, 1917, Gard enlisted in the United States Army. Gard was commissioned as a First Lieutenant, served in the Army's 362nd Infantry Regiment, 91st Division, and was deployed to France during World War I. On September 27, 1918, Gard was killed in action during an advance through Gesnes, France. Gard was buried at the Meuse-Argonne American Cemetery near Romagne-sous-Montfaucon in France.
