= Laird Morris =

American rugby union player (b. 1889)

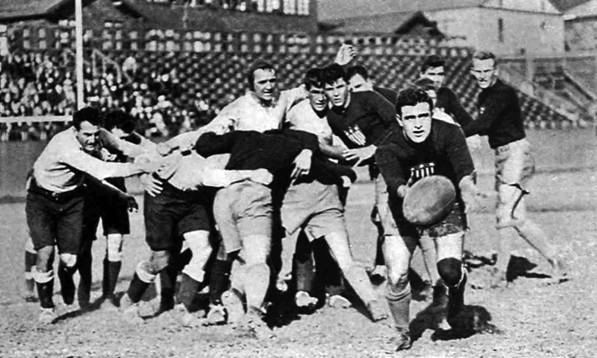
- Morris passes back from a scrum during the 1912 match against Australia
- Full name: Laird Monterey Morris
- Born: October 9, 1889 California
- Died: August 19, 1954 (aged 64) San Francisco, California
- Height: 5 ft 7.5 in (1.71 m)
- Weight: 150 lb (68 kg; 10 st 10 lb)
- University: University of California

Rugby union career
- Position: Scrum-half
Amateur team(s)
Years	Team	Apps	(Points)
1910–1912	University of California		
- Correct as of November 5, 2018
International career
Years	Team	Apps	(Points)
1910–1912	United States	1	(0)
- Correct as of November 5, 2018

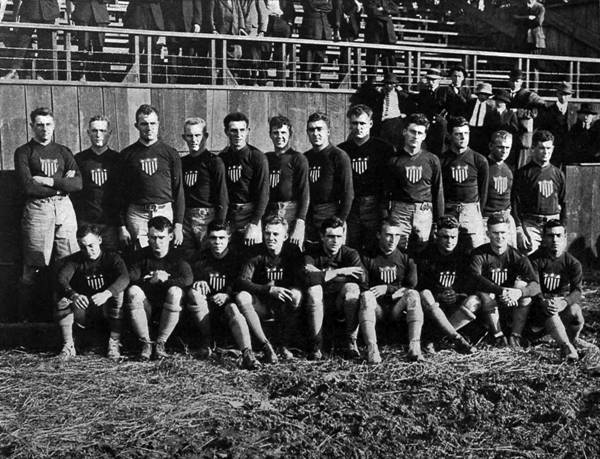
Morris with the US team in 1912 (pictured front row, fifth from left)

Laird Monterey "Monte" Morris (October 9, 1889 – August 19, 1954) was an American rugby union player who played at scrum-half for the United States men's national team in its first capped match in 1912.

== Biography ==
Morris was born on October 9, 1889, in California. He was the son of Henry Bishop Morris and Mary Kathryn Morris (born Baker).

Morris attended the University of California, where in 1910 he earned a place on the varsity rugby team. In 1911, Morris was late to return to the university, but eventually did so and rejoined the rugby team. During the 1912 season, Morris saw his playing time reduced as the coaching staff attempted to develop other players to play his position, although he remained the best player at that position on the university team. At the end of the 1912 season, on November 16, 1912, Morris played for the United States team at scrum-half in its first capped match—a 12–8 loss to Australia. Morris served as the team's captain for this match.

In 1913, Morris did not return to the University of California rugby team. Over the course of his collegiate rugby career, Morris was described as "one of the grittiest halves that ever trailed a scrum," and as a member of "one of the most brilliant [back field] combinations ever seen on the Coast." As a member of the class of 1913, Morris was a member of the Winged Helmet and Golden Bear honor societies at the University of California. Morris died on August 19, 1954, in San Francisco, California.

== Notes ==
- The 1914 Blue & Gold of the University of California: Published by the Junior Class in the Year 1913. Vol. 40. University of California, Berkeley. 1913.
