= 1995 Rugby World Cup – Americas qualification =

For the 1995 Rugby World Cup in South Africa, the Americas were allocated one direct qualifying place (Americas 1) in addition to the automatic qualification of Canada which was granted a place due to reaching the quarter-final stages of the 1991 tournament.

The regional bodies, CONSUR representing South America and NAWIRA representing North America, conducted their own qualification matches in the first round determine their respective top teams. A home and away play-off between those two teams then decided the World Cup qualification place. Argentina won both matches over the United States to secure qualification for the 1995 tournament.

== Round 1 ==
=== South America ===
Standings

Team	Played	Won	Drawn	Lost	For	Against	Difference	Points
Argentina	3	3	0	0	140	20	+120	9
Uruguay	3	2	0	1	91	28	+63	7
Paraguay	3	1	0	2	31	142	−111	5
Chile	3	0	0	3	37	109	−72	3

Matches

Match Results
Date	Home	Score	Away	Venue
26 September 1993	Chile	24–25	Paraguay	Santiago, Chile
2 October 1993	Paraguay	3–67	Uruguay	Asunción, Paraguay
9 October 1993	Uruguay	14–6	Chile	Montevideo, Uruguay
11 October 1993	Argentina	70–7	Chile	Buenos Aires, Argentina
16 October 1993	Argentina	51–3	Paraguay	Buenos Aires, Argentina
23 October 1993	Uruguay	10–19	Argentina	Montevideo, Uruguay

=== North America ===
One-off match

Match Results
Date	Home	Score	Away	Venue
12 March 1994	Bermuda	3–60	United States	Devonshire, Bermuda

== Round 2: Qualifying play-off ==
Home and away

Match Results
Date	Home	Score	Away	Venue
28 May 1994	United States	22–28	Argentina	Long Beach, California, USA
20 June 1994	Argentina	16–11	United States	Buenos Aires, Argentina
