= 2003 PARA Pan American Championship =

Rugby Tournament

5° PARA Pan American Championship
Tournament details
- Host: Argentina
- Date: 23–30 August 2003
- Teams: Argentina; Canada; United States; Uruguay

Final positions
- Champions: Argentina
- Runner-up: United States

Tournament statistics
- Matches played: 6

The 2003 PARA Pan American Championship was the last and fifth edition of this rugby union tournament.

It was held in Buenos Aires and was an important step for the four team to prepare the 2003 Rugby World Cup

As the previous four was won by Argentina.

== Standings ==
Team	Played	Won	Drawn	Lost	For	Against	Difference	Pts
Argentina	3	3	0	0	161	30	+131	6
United States	3	2	0	1	74	79	−5	4
Canada	3	1	0	2	63	108	−45	2
Uruguay	3	0	0	3	28	109	−81	0

== Results ==
23 August 2003

Argentina	42 - 8	United States
	Report

Stadium of B.A. C & R, Buenos Aires

23 August 2003

Canada	21 - 11	Uruguay

Stadium of B.A. C & R, Buenos Aires

27 August 2003

Argentina	57 - 0	Uruguay
	Report

Stadium of C.A.S.I., Buenos Aires

27 August 2003

United States	35 - 20	Canada

Club Atlético San Isidro, Buenos Aires

30 August 2003

Argentina	62 - 22	Canada
	Report

Stadium of B.A. C & R, Buenos Aires

30 August 2003

United States	31 - 17	Uruguay

Stadium of B.A. C & R, Buenos Aires
