= Benjamin Erb =

American rugby union player (b. 1892)

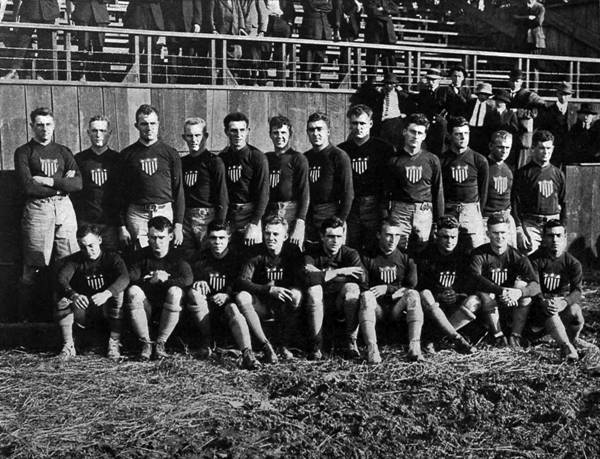
- Erb with the US team in 1912 (pictured front row, sixth from left)
- Full name: Benjamin Edward Erb
- Born: March 12, 1892 Minneapolis, Minnesota
- Died: June 8, 1988 (aged 96) Novato, California
- University: Stanford University

Rugby union career
- Position: Fullback
Amateur team(s)
Years	Team	Apps	(Points)
1908–1912	Stanford University		
- Correct as of May 26, 2018
International career
Years	Team	Apps	(Points)
1910–1913	United States	1	(5)
- Correct as of May 26, 2018

Benjamin Edward Erb (December 3, 1892 – June 8, 1988) was an American rugby union player who played fullback for the United States men's national team in its first capped match in 1912.

== Biography ==
Erb was born on December 3, 1892, in Minneapolis, Minnesota, the son of John Erb and Rosa Erb (born Luedke). He was one of 10 children in a rugby-playing family and was raised in Vancouver, British Columbia. Erb attended Stanford University from 1908 until 1912, where he played for the rugby team and served as captain during his senior season. In 1910, he began playing rugby for the United States national team, joining them on their tour of Australia and New Zealand against club opposition. On November 16, 1912, Erb played for the United States at fullback in its first capped match against Australia. In that match, he scored one conversion "from a difficult angle" and one penalty goal from a distance of 40 yards. Erb was also included in the roster for the United States in their 1913 match against New Zealand, but did not make an appearance. Erb's younger brother, Arthur L. Erb, also attended Stanford and played rugby there.

Outside of rugby, Erb was drafted into the United States Army. He died in Novato, California on June 8, 1988.
