= William Darsie =

US international rugby union player (1891–1954)

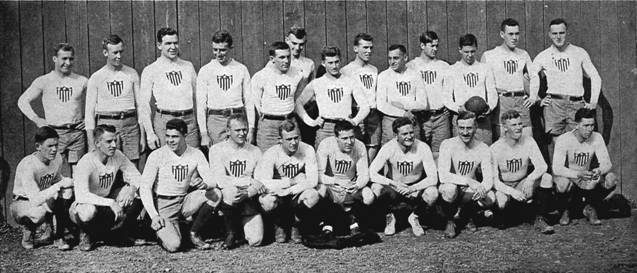
- Darsie with the US team in 1913 (pictured back row, fourth from left)
- Full name: William Pettigrew Darsie
- Born: January 6, 1891 Pittsburgh, Pennsylvania
- Died: January 30, 1954 (aged 63) Santa Clara, California
- School: Palo Alto High School
- University: Stanford University

Rugby union career
- Position: Flanker
Amateur team(s)
Years	Team	Apps	(Points)
1911–1914	Stanford University		
- Correct as of January 2, 2019
International career
Years	Team	Apps	(Points)
1913	United States	1	(0)
- Correct as of January 2, 2019

William Pettigrew Darsie (January 6, 1891 – January 30, 1954) was an American rugby union player who played at flanker for the United States men's national team in its first capped match against New Zealand in 1913.

== Biography ==
William Darsie was born on January 6, 1891, in Pittsburgh, Pennsylvania, the son and one of three children of William W. Darsie and Jean P. Darsie (born Pettigrew). Upon his father's retirement in 1905, Darsie moved with his family to Palo Alto, California, where he attended Palo Alto High School. While in high school, Darsie played rugby with his school's team.

After high school, Darsie attended Stanford University and was a member of the university's rugby teams. In 1913, Darsie was the acting captain of the Stanford rugby team. While at Stanford, Darsie was a member of the California Beta chapter of the Phi Kappa Psi fraternity. On November 15, 1913, Darsie played for the United States at flanker in its first test match against New Zealand—a 51–3 defeat.

After attending Stanford, Darsie worked as a vegetable farmer and chaired a California agricultural advisory committee during World War II. Darsie married Mildred S. Powers, with whom he had two children. Darsie died on January 30, 1954, in Santa Clara, California, at the age of 63.
