= Roland Blase =

American rugby union player (b. 1887)

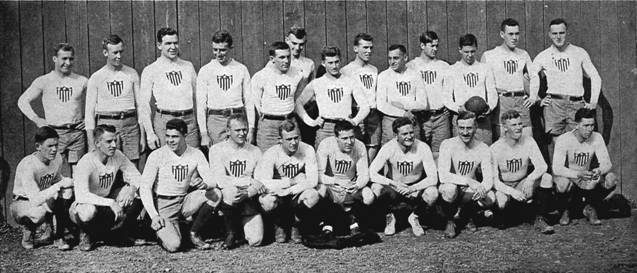
- Blase with the US team in 1913 (pictured back row, second from right)
- Full name: Roland Roy Blase
- Born: May 3, 1887 Saint Paul, Minnesota
- Died: March 16, 1979 (aged 91) Saint Paul, Minnesota
- Height: 6 ft 3 in (1.91 m)
- Weight: 193 lb (88 kg)
- University: Stanford University

Rugby union career
- Position: Lock
Amateur team(s)
Years	Team	Apps	(Points)
1910–1914	Stanford University		
- Correct as of December 10, 2018
International career
Years	Team	Apps	(Points)
1913	United States	1	(0)
- Correct as of December 10, 2018

Roland Roy Blase (May 3, 1887 – March 16, 1979) was an American rugby union player who played at lock for the United States men's national team in its first capped match against New Zealand in 1913.

== Biography ==
Roland Blase was born on May 3, 1887, in Saint Paul, Minnesota, the son and youngest child of Ernest Frederick Blase and Margaret Christine Blase (born Bach). Blase attended Stanford University beginning in 1910, where he was a member of the school's rugby team and a member of the Beta Chi chapter of the Sigma Nu fraternity. Also while at Stanford, Blase was a member of the varsity crew team. On November 15, 1913, Blase played for the United States at lock in its first test match against New Zealand—a 51–3 defeat. Blase graduated from Stanford in 1914 with a degree in civil engineering and subsequently moved back to Saint Paul. In the course of his engineering career, he worked for the firm Toltz, King & Day. Blase never married or had children and died on March 16, 1979, in Saint Paul at the age of 91.
