= Guy Voight =

American rugby union player (b. 1889)

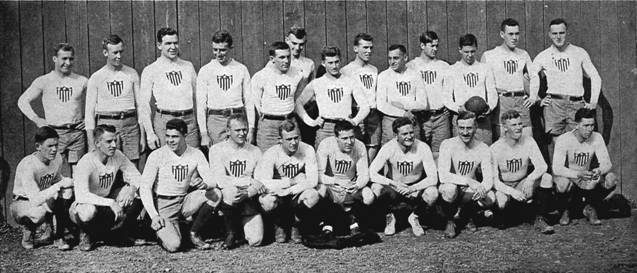
- Voight with the US team in 1913 (pictured back row, fourth from right)
- Full name: Henry Joseph Voight
- Born: September 30, 1889 Council Bluffs, Iowa
- Died: November 26, 1937 (aged 48) Tulsa, Oklahoma
- University: Santa Clara University

Rugby union career
- Position: Lock
Amateur team(s)
Years	Team	Apps	(Points)
1910–1914	Santa Clara University		
- Correct as of January 3, 2019
International career
Years	Team	Apps	(Points)
1913	United States	1	(0)
- Correct as of January 3, 2019

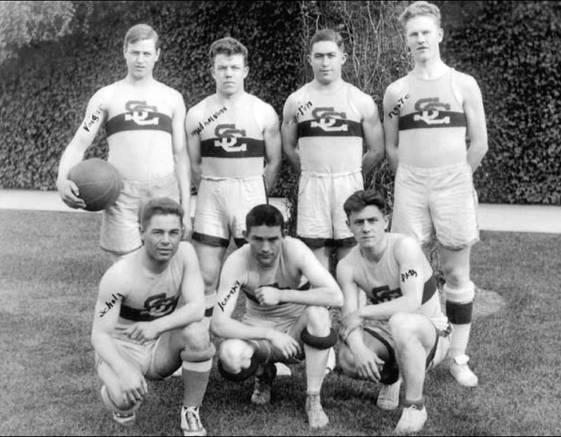
Voight with the Santa Clara Broncos men's basketball team during the 1914–15 season (pictured back row, first from left)

Henry Joseph "Guy" Voight (September 30, 1889 – November 26, 1937) was an American rugby union player who played at lock for the United States men's national team in its first capped match against New Zealand in 1913.

== Biography ==
Guy Voight was born on September 30, 1889, in Council Bluffs, Iowa, the son and one of multiple children of Henry Joseph Voight and Mari Johanna "Jennie" Voight (born Gullickson). Both Voight's father and grandfather were also named Henry Joseph Voight. As a young adult, Voight played baseball for a semi-professional team in Sedro-Woolley, Washington.

From 1910 until 1915, Voight attended Santa Clara University where he majored in civil engineering and was a member of the school's rugby and basketball teams. On November 15, 1913, Voight played for the United States national rugby union team at lock in its first test match against New Zealand—a 51–3 defeat.

After his university years, Voight worked as a sheepherder in Utah and was drafted into the United States Army during World War I. Voight served with the Army Corps of Engineers at Fort Douglas. Voight married Flossie Elizabeth Smith on August 12, 1918, in Salt Lake City, Utah with whom he had multiple children. After being discharged from the Army, Voight returned to his hometown of Council Bluffs and later moved with his family to Sapulpa, Oklahoma. After suffering from a heart attack, Voight died on November 26, 1937, in Tulsa, Oklahoma at the age of 48.
