= Stirling Peart =

American rugby union player (b. 1890)

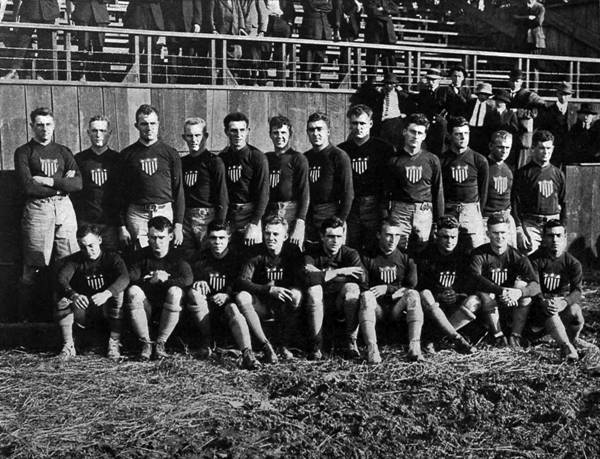
- Peart with the US team in 1912 (pictured front row, fourth from left)
- Full name: Stirling Benjamin Peart
- Born: December 24, 1890 California
- Died: November 26, 1963 (aged 72) Yolo, California
- University: University of California

Rugby union career
- Position(s): Wing; Fullback
Amateur team(s)
Years	Team	Apps	(Points)
1910–1915	University of California		
- Correct as of June 27, 2018
International career
Years	Team	Apps	(Points)
1912–1913	United States	2	(3)
- Correct as of June 27, 2018

Stirling Benjamin Peart (December 24, 1890 – November 26, 1963) was an American rugby union player who played wing for the United States men's national team in its first two capped matches in 1912 and 1913.

== Biography ==
Peart was born on December 24, 1890, in California, the son of Benjamin Franklin Peart and Sophia Elizabeth Peart (born Fiske). Peart went to school at Woodland High School and later attended the University of California, graduating in 1915 with a degree in Agriculture. In 1910, Peart coached rugby at Woodland High School. While at the University of California, Peart sang in the glee club, played for the school's rugby team, and became a member of the Beta Xi chapter of the Kappa Sigma fraternity. During his time playing for the California rugby team, Peart was named captain, beginning in the 1913 season.

On November 16, 1912, Peart played for the United States at wing in its first capped match—a 12–8 loss to Australia. On November 15, 1913, Peart also played for the United States at wing in its first test match against New Zealand. Peart scored the only points for the United States in the match on a penalty goal; the match ended as a 51–3 defeat. Although he never made a test appearance for the United States at the position, Peart was also a capable substitute at fullback.

After his graduation from the University of California, Peart worked as a farmer and rancher in Yolo County, California. Peart married Gladys Vesta Elkins in 1921, and was the father of two children. Peart died on November 26, 1963, in Yolo, California.
