= 2008 Churchill Cup =

- Date: 7–21 June 2008
- Countries: Argentina XV; Canada; England Saxons; Ireland Wolfhounds; Scotland A United States

Final positions
- Champions: England (4th title)

Tournament statistics
- Matches played: 9

The 2008 Churchill Cup took place between 7 June and 21 June 2008 in what was the sixth year of the Churchill Cup. Six rugby union teams took part: Canada, England Saxons, Ireland A, Scotland A, the USA, and an Argentinian XV.

== Participation ==
The entry of an Argentinian XV into the competition stems from a decision by the New Zealand Rugby Union not to assemble its 'A' team, the Junior All Blacks, in 2008; as a consequence, the New Zealand Māori, who have taken part in the last three Churchill Cup tournaments, replaced the Juniors in the Pacific Nations Cup and were not available for the Churchill Cup.

== Format ==
The teams were split into two pools of three teams each. Within each pool, the teams played one another once. All six teams participated in a finals day: the two pool winners competed in the final for the Churchill Cup, the two runners-up played in a Plate final, and the two bottom-placed teams competed for a Bowl.

== Venues ==
After the 2007 tournament, which was the first to be played outside of North America, the 2008 tournament returned to North America again. The pool games were played at three venues in Ontario, Canada: Fletcher's Fields, Markham; Twin Elm Rugby Park, Nepean; and Richardson Memorial Stadium, Kingston. Finals Day took place at Toyota Park, Chicago.

== Fixtures ==
=== USA Pool ===
Place	Nation	Games				Points			Bonus points	Table points
Place	Nation	Played	Won	Drawn	Lost	For	Against	Difference	Bonus points	Table points
1	England Saxons	2	2	0	0	98	22	+76	2	10
2	Ireland A	2	1	0	1	58	43	+15	1	5
3	United States	2	0	0	2	19	110	-91	0	0

2008-06-07
14:00

England Saxons	64 – 10	United States
	Report

Lansdowne Stadium, Ottawa, Ontario
Referee: A Macpherson (Scotland)

2008-06-11
19:00

United States	9 – 46	Ireland A
	Report

Richardson Memorial Stadium, Kingston
Referee: F Cuesta (Argentina)

2008-06-14
14:00

Ireland A	12 – 34	England Saxons

Fletcher's Fields, Markham

=== Canada Pool ===
Place	Nation	Games				Points			Bonus points	Table points
Place	Nation	Played	Won	Drawn	Lost	For	Against	Difference	Bonus points	Table points
1	Scotland A	2	2	0	0	51	34	17	2	10
2	Argentinian XV	2	1	0	1	41	43	-2	2	6
3	Canada	2	0	0	2	26	41	-15	1	1

2008-06-07
16:30

Scotland A	24 – 10	Canada

Twin Elm Rugby Park, Nepean

2008-06-11
16:30

Scotland A	27 – 24	Argentinian XV

Richardson Memorial Stadium, Kingston

2008-06-14
16:30

Argentinian XV	17 – 16	Canada

Fletcher's Fields, Markham

=== Finals ===
==== Bowl Final ====
2008-06-21
16:15

United States	10 – 26	Canada
	Report

Toyota Park, Chicago

==== Plate Final ====
2008-06-21
11:45

Argentinian XV	8 – 33	Ireland A

Toyota Park, Chicago

==== Cup Final ====
2008-06-21
14:00

England Saxons	36 – 19	Scotland A

Toyota Park, Chicago

== See also ==
- Churchill Cup
