= Deaths in February 1980 =

The following is a list of notable deaths in February 1980. Entries for each day are listed alphabetically by surname. A typical entry lists information in the following sequence:

- Name, age, country of citizenship at birth, subsequent country of citizenship (if applicable), reason for notability, cause of death (if known), and reference.

== February 1980 ==
=== 1 ===
- John Armitage, 69, British editor (Encyclopædia Britannica).
- Jack Bailey, 72, American actor and game show host, pneumonia.
- C. C. Cottrell, 84, American politician, member of the California State Assembly (1933–1939).
- Yolanda González, 19, Spanish student and communist activist, murdered.
- Sir Patrick Hancock, 65, British diplomat.
- Costante Maltoni, 64, Italian Roman Catholic prelate, cardiopulmonary arrest.
- Greg Mulleavy, 74, American baseball player, manager, and scout.
- Gastone Nencini, 49, Italian racing cyclist.
- Sam Nunis, 76, American stock car racing promoter.
- Rasiklal Umedchand Parikh, 69, Indian politician.
- Henry Reinholdt, 90, Norwegian footballer.
- Rube Ursella, 90, American football player and coach.
- Romolo Valli, 54, Italian actor, traffic collision.
- Fred Walters, 67, American baseball player.

=== 2 ===
- Joseph Fontanet, 58, French politician, shot.
- Carmelo Larrea, 72, Spanish songwriter.
- Sigurd Lersbryggen, 78, Norwegian politician.
- Tom Perko, 25, American football player, traffic collision.
- Jack Rothrock, 74, American baseball player, heart attack.
- William Howard Stein, 68, American biochemist, Nobel Prize laureate (1972), heart failure.
- Johnny Walker, 71, Australian footballer.
- Toshiko Yuasa, 70, Japanese-French nuclear physicist, cancer.

=== 3 ===
- Marnie Bassett, 90, Australian historian and travel writer.
- Léon Destroismaisons, 89, Canadian organist and composer.
- Stephen Dunn, 85, American sound engineer.
- Ray Garrett Jr., 59, American lawyer and government official, SEC chair (1973–1975), cancer.
- Ray Heindorf, 71, American songwriter.
- Rodney Holmes, 55, English cricketer, avalanche.
- Kurt Harald Isenstein, 81, German sculptor.
- Ailsa O'Connor, 59, Australian artist.
- Hanna Rovina, 91, Russian-Israeli actress.
- Pedro Sabido, 85, Filipino politician and diplomat.
- Ludomila Alexandrowna Scheiwiler-von Schreyder, 91, Swiss women's rights activist.
- Margit Sielska-Reich, 79, Polish-Ukrainian painter.
- Amanda Snyder, 85, American artist.
- Betty Timms, 93, English writer.
- José Victor Toledo, 48, Puerto Rican jurist, cancer.

=== 4 ===
- Stojan Aralica, 96, Serbian painter and academic.
- Erich Bauer, 79, German SS commander and war criminal.
- Dud Branom, 82, American baseball player.
- Alfred Braunthal, 82, Austrian trade unionist.
- Camara Laye, 52, Guinean writer, kidney disease.
- Arthur MacMahon, 89, American political scientist, heart attack.
- Leon P. Miller, 80, American lawyer and jurist.
- Vincent Pottier, 82, Canadian politician, MP (1935–1945).
- Edith Summerskill, 78, British politician and physician, MP (1938–1961) and member of the House of Lords (since 1961), heart attack.
- Hugh Watt, 67, New Zealand politician, MP (1953–1975) and acting prime minister (1974).
- David Whitaker, 51, English television writer (Doctor Who), cancer.

=== 5 ===
- Nachman Aronszajn, 72, Polish-American mathematician.
- Carl Bødtker, 93, Norwegian engineer and radio personality.
- Charles Dowson, 90, British Olympic racewalker (1920).
- Roy Fosdahl, 68, Norwegian footballer.
- Lawrence Grassi, 89, Italian-Canadian miner and mountaineer.
- James Campbell Haig, 70, Canadian politician.
- Skinny Johnson, 68, American basketball player.
- Jack Larscheid, 46, American football player.
- Sir Harold Parker, 84–85, English civil servant.
- Maurice Pouzieux, 59, French Olympic runner (1948).
- Master Gurbanta Singh, 75, Indian politician.
- Michel Sturdza, 93, Romanian nobleman, diplomat and war criminal.
- Petras Tarulis, 83, Lithuanian writer and journalist.

=== 6 ===
- Sir William Abraham, 82, British general.
- John J. Britt, 79, American philatelist.
- Myrtle Cain, 85, American labor activist and politician, member of the Minnesota House of Representatives (1923–1925).
- Elmer W. Cart, 88, American politician.
- George Decker, 77, American general, leukemia.
- Bernhard Eichhorn, 75, German composer.
- József Galambos, 79, Hungarian Olympic runner (1928).
- Jalil Javadov, 61, Soviet Azerbaijani naval admiral.
- John Phuko Kgabi, 35, South African convicted serial killer, execution by hanging.
- Reinhard Kollak, 64, German flying ace.
- Albert Kotin, 72, Russian-born American painter, lung cancer.
- Ivan Matteo Lombardo, 77, Italian politician.
- Don Ross, 77, English music hall performer and theatre producer.
- Franz Schafheitlin, 84, German actor.

=== 7 ===
- Rudolf Bosshard, 89–90, Swiss Olympic rower (1920, 1924, 1928).
- Secondo Campini, 75, Italian engineer.
- Eugen Dasović, 83, Croatian footballer.
- Katherine Emery, 73, American actress, lung disease.
- Lovie Gore, 76, American politician, member of the Mississippi House of Representatives (1952–1960).
- Keith Virtue, 70, Australian aviator.
- Sir Richard Williams, 89, Australian air marshal.

=== 8 ===
- Princess Anna of Ysenburg and Büdingen, 93, German royal.
- Erwin Friedrich Baumann, 89, Swiss architect and sculptor.
- Art Beaumont, 75, Australian footballer.
- Isadora Bennett, 79, American publicity agent and theater manager.
- Geoffrey E. Blackman, 76, British agronomist.
- E. P. Bottley, 76, English geologist and businessman.
- Ivan Gošnjak, 70, Yugoslav politician and general.
- Zezé Procópio, 66, Brazilian footballer.
- Andreas Strand, 84, Norwegian entomologist.
- Leopold Suhodolčan, 51, Yugoslav Slovenian writer.
- Joe Sulaitis, 58, American football player, heart attack.
- Sir Miles Thomas, 82, Welsh businessman.
- Leslie Welch, 72, British entertainer.
- Nikos Xilouris, 43, Greek singer and songwriter, lung cancer.
- Francesco Zucchetti, 77, Italian Olympic racing cyclist (1924).

=== 9 ===
- Rostislav Alexeyev, 63, Soviet vehicle designer, plane crash.
- Heron Carvic, 67, English actor and writer, pneumonia.
- Clyde T. Ellis, 71, American politician, member of the U.S. House of Representatives (1939–1943), stroke.
- Charles Fowlkes, 63, American saxophonist.
- John C. Goodchild, 81, Australian artist.
- Renée Houston, 77, Scottish actress.
- William Henderson Kelly, 77, American anthropologist, cancer.
- John Kennedy, 57, British cellist, liver disease.
- Tom Macdonald, 79, Welsh journalist and novelist.
- Nikolay Psurtsev, 80, Soviet politician and general.
- Kitty Shiva Rao, 76, Austrian-Indian teacher and activist.
- Shalibai, 40, Indian actor, singer and composer.
- Ludwig Waldmann, 66, German physicist.

=== 10 ===
- Loren M. Berry, 91, American advertising executive.
- Arthur Burlton, 79, Indian-born English cricketer.
- Sir Edwin Chapman-Andrews, 76, British diplomat.
- Signe Danning, 101, Norwegian actress.
- Wels Eicke, 86, Australian footballer.
- Abe Gubegna, 46, Ethiopian novelist, playwright and poet.
- George Hoellering, 82, Australian filmmaker.
- Norman W. Marsh, 81, American cartoonist (Dan Dunn).
- Albert Murray, Baron Murray of Gravesend, 50, British politician, MP (1964–1970) and member of the House of Lords (since 1976).
- Corina Novelino, 67, Brazilian writer and philanthropist.
- Louis W. Sauer, 94, American pediatrician and vaccine developer, pneumonia and heart failure.
- Friedrich Smend, 86, German theologian.
- Rezső Soó, 76, Hungarian botanist.
- Suren Tovmasyan, 70, Soviet Armenian diplomat and politician.
- Wally Wales, 84, American actor, complications from a stroke.

=== 11 ===
- Bud Boeringer, 76, American football player.
- Vella Eacharan, 61, Indian politician, heart attack.
- Hubert Giesen, 82, German pianist.
- Richard Harrington Levet, 86, American judge.
- R. C. Majumdar, 91, Indian historian.
- Yakov Malik, 73, Soviet diplomat.
- Udell H. Stallings, 80, American football and baseball player and coach.
- Red Torphy, 88, American baseball player.
- Paavo Yrjölä, 77, Finnish Olympic track and field athlete (1928).

=== 12 ===
- Vittorio Bachelet, 53, Italian politician and judge, shot.
- Hasan M. Balyuzi, 71, Iranian-British Baháʼí official and historian.
- Samuel D. Berger, 68, American diplomat, cancer.
- Joe De Medici, 59, Australian footballer.
- Alice Henson Ernst, 99, American playwright and anthropologist.
- Clara Lazar Geroe, 79, Hungarian-Australian psychoanalyst.
- Einar Hille, 85, American mathematician.
- Carl Howard, 75, American baseball player.
- Biff Jones, 84, American football player and coach.
- Norman Keenan, 63, American jazz bassist.
- Francis D. Lee, 68, American politician, member of the Nebraska Legislature (1966–1967).
- Sylvia Leith-Ross, 95, English anthropologist.
- Anatoliy Lure, 78, Soviet engineer and mathematician.
- Howdy Myers, 69, American football and lacrosse coach, heart failure.
- Donald C. Rubel, 79, American politician and banker.
- Muriel Rukeyser, 66, American poet, stroke.
- Edward Seymour, 74, Irish cricketer.
- Jørgen Stubberud, 96, Norwegian polar explorer.
- Jacques Tauraa, 60, French Polynesian politician.
- Georgia Vasileiadou, 82–83, Greek actress.

=== 13 ===
- Eric O. Anderson, 74, American politician, member of the Washington House of Representatives (1961–1975).
- Hugh DeHaven, 84, American pilot and safety pioneer.
- Abe Espinosa, 91, American golfer and golf course designer.
- Paul R. Hays, 76, American judge.
- Alfred Jackson, 84, British Olympic boxer (1928).
- David Janssen, 48, American actor (The Fugitive), heart attack.
- Moultrie Kelsall, 75, Scottish actor.
- Jo Meynen, 78, Dutch politician.
- Stjepan Mohorovičić, 89, Croatian physicist and meteorologist.
- Mike Monroney, 77, American politician, member of the U.S. Senate (1951–1969) and House of Representatives (1939–1951).
- Peter Douglas Herbert Raymond Pelly, 75, British naval admiral.
- Marian Rejewski, 74, Polish mathematician and cryptologist, heart attack.
- Leonard Patrick Walsh, 75, American judge.

=== 14 ===
- Kitsuju Ayabe, 85, Japanese general.
- Marie Besnard, 83, French accused and acquitted serial poisoner, bone cancer.
- Gunnar Björk, 89, Swedish Olympic racing cyclist (1912).
- R. L. Brohier, 87, Sri Lankan surveyor and writer.
- Norman Carton, 72, Russian-born American artist, heart attack.
- Victor Gruen, 76, Austrian-American architect, popularized shopping malls.
- Frank Holmes, 95, American Olympic track and field athlete (1908).
- Norman Jackson, 70, American baseball player.
- Karl Jestrab, 73, Austrian footballer.
- Ricky Knotts, 28, American racing driver, racing crash.
- Jules LaDuron, 86, American physician and football player, heart attack.
- Marius Lavet, 86, French engineer.
- Allin H. Pierce, 83, American judge.
- Manhar Raskapur, 57, Indian film director.
- Rza Tahmasib, 85, Soviet Azerbaijani film director and actor.
- Frank Ward, 75, American basketball player.
- Abraham White, 71, American biochemist.

=== 15 ===
- Isao Abe, 67, Japanese Olympic hammer thrower (1936).
- Albin Dahl, 80, Swedish football player and manager.
- Sir Ernest Down, 78, British general.
- Margaret Heavey, 72, Irish classical scholar.
- Tom Keogh, 58, American fashion illustrator and costume designer.
- Kim Un-bae, 66, South Korean Olympic runner (1932).
- Gaston LeBlanc, 38, Canadian politician.
- S. S. Mirajkar, 81, Indian politician and trade unionist.
- Jirō Nitta, 67, Japanese novelist.
- Sohn Won-yil, 70, South Korean naval admiral.
- Charles L. Thomas, 59, American soldier, Medal of Honor recipient.

=== 16 ===
- Ernesto Antúnez, 68, Chilean politician.
- Geoffrey Hornblower Cock, 84, British flying ace.
- Edward Copson, 78, British mathematician.
- Sybil Courtice, 95, Canadian music educator and missionary.
- Stan Dreben, 61, American screenwriter.
- Emily Edwards, 91, American conservationist.
- Grete Groh-Kummerlöw, 71, German politician.
- Samuel J. Hefferton, 83, Canadian politician.
- Erich Hückel, 83, German physicist.
- Oscar Klement, 82, German lichenologist.
- Ruth Klüger-Aliav, 69, Romanian-born Israeli Zionist activist.
- Percy Legard, 73, British Olympic pentathlete (1932, 1936, 1948).
- Arthur Loveridge, 88, British herpetologist.
- Daniel E. Noble, 78, American engineer.
- Allen Shenstone, 86, Canadian physicist.
- J. Joseph Smith, 76, American judge and politician, member of the U.S. House of Representatives (1935–1941), complications from a heart attack.
- William Stoney, 81, British Olympic swimmer (1920, 1924).
- Knut Olaf Andreasson Strand, 92, Norwegian politician.

=== 17 ===
- Charlie Cairoli, 70, Italian-English clown and musician.
- Jerry Fielding, 57, American jazz musician and film composer, heart attack.
- Ed Graves, 62, American art director.
- Leslie Douglas Jackson, 62, Australian flying ace, stroke.
- Einar Karlsson, 71, Swedish Olympic wrestler (1932, 1936).
- Louise Emerson Ronnebeck, 78, American painter.
- John Sandwall, 62, Swedish Olympic fencer (1956).
- Howard C. Sheperd, 85, American banker and businessman.
- Robert Stokes, 71, American animator.
- Graham Sutherland, 76, English artist.

=== 18 ===
- Muriel Brunskill, 80, English singer.
- Arthur Floyer-Acland, 94, British general.
- Maxwell K. Goldstein, 72, American engineer.
- George Hesselbacher, 85, American baseball player.
- Lawrie Hodgson, 63, English footballer.
- Paul Howard, 84, American jazz musician.
- Dermot Kelly, 61, Northern Irish actor.
- Václav Lohniský, 59, Czechoslovak actor.
- William D. McFarlane, 85, American politician, member of the U.S. House of Representatives (1933–1939), cancer.
- Frank R. McKelvy, 66, American set decorator.
- Mow Mitchell, 93, American rugby player.
- Gale Robbins, 58, American actress and singer, lung cancer.
- Dick Stone, 68, American baseball player.
- Nathan Yellin-Mor, 66, Russian-born Israeli political activist and militant (Lehi), leukemia.

=== 19 ===
- Arthur Childs-Clarke, 74, English cricketer.
- Jason Lee, 64, American judge.
- Ernest William Lunn Martin, 91, British missionary and educator.
- Robert Morrison, 77, British Olympic rower (1924).
- Bon Scott, 33, Scottish-born Australian singer (AC/DC) and songwriter ("Highway to Hell", "Dirty Deeds Done Dirt Cheap"), alcohol poisoning.
- Shorty Sherock, 64, American jazz trumpeter, cancer.
- James Crosbie Smith, 85, English cricketer.
- R. C. S. Walters, 91, New Zealand-born British civil engineer and geologist.

=== 20 ===
- Andrei Abraham, 63, Romanian Olympic gymnast (1936).
- Neal W. Cobleigh, 78, American politician, member of the New Hampshire House of Representatives (1972–1976).
- Hugo Kraas, 69, German SS commander and war criminal.
- Alice Roosevelt Longworth, 96, American writer and socialite, daughter of Theodore Roosevelt, pneumonia.
- E. Keith Potter, 68, Canadian politician.
- Joseph Banks Rhine, 84, American parapsychologist and botanist.
- Katherine Binney Shippen, 87, American historian and writer.
- Sir Roger Stevens, 73, British diplomat.
- Erich Vagts, 84, German politician.

=== 21 ===
- Alfred Andersch, 66, German writer and publisher.
- Aldo Andreotti, 55, Italian mathematician.
- Gordon Boyd, 74, Scottish rugby player.
- Jimmy Donnelly, 51, Irish lawn bowler, heart attack.
- Belmácio Pousa Godinho, 87, Brazilian football player and musician
- Camille Graeser, 87, Swiss painter.
- Harold Locke Hazen, 78, American electrical engineer.
- Carol Jerrems, 30, Australian photographer and filmmaker, Budd–Chiari syndrome.
- Mario Lanzi, 65, Italian Olympic runner (1936).
- Chester Lauck, 78, American actor (Lum and Abner).
- Kathleen Sampson, 87, English mycologist.
- Donald W. Tinkle, 49, American herpetologist.

=== 22 ===
- Sadaaki Akamatsu, 69, Japanese flying ace, pneumonia.
- Aníbal de Mar, 61, Cuban actor.
- Dick Kallman, 46, American actor, shot.
- Oskar Kokoschka, 93, Austrian artist and playwright, influenza.
- William Moore McCulloch, 78, American politician, member of the U.S. House of Representatives (1947–1973), heart attack.
- Albert G. Noble, 84, American naval admiral.
- Emy von Stetten, 81, German opera singer and music teacher.
- Jorge B. Vargas, 89, Filipino politician and diplomat.
- Jean Wolter, 53, Luxembourgish journalist and politician, lung cancer.

=== 23 ===
- Enrico Celio, 90, Swiss politician, president (1943, 1948).
- Marion Delf-Smith, 97, British botanist.
- Hans Hüttig, 85, German Nazi official and war criminal.
- John McCann, 74, Irish politician, TD (1939–1954).

=== 24 ===
- Georgios Andrianopoulos, 76, Greek footballer.
- Awaludin, 63, Indonesian actor.
- Red Blanchard, 65, American musician and comedian.
- Michael Browne, 84, Irish Roman Catholic prelate.
- John Darrow, 72, American actor.
- Clement Martyn Doke, 86, South African linguist.
- Desmond Dunnet, 66, New Zealand cricketer.
- Ray Eliot, 74, American football and baseball player and coach, heart attack.
- Parviz Fannizadeh, 42, Iranian actor, cancer.
- Fritz Gegauf, 86, Swiss businessman and inventor.
- Émile Joly, 75, Belgian racing cyclist.
- Devulapalli Krishnasastri, 82, Indian playwright and translator.
- Manuel Merino Esquivel, 93, Chilean politician.
- Albert Parsis, 89, French footballer.
- Arvo Rytkönen, 50, Finnish diplomat.
- Oliver Strunk, 78, American musicologist.
- Michael Tschesno-Hell, 78, Lithuanian-born German screenwriter.
- Voldemārs Vītols, 69, Latvian Olympic runner (1936).
- Paul Wilson, Baron Wilson of High Wray, 71, British engineer and public servant.

=== 25 ===
- Giuseppe Brenna, 81, Italian racing cyclist.
- Émile Coornaert, 93, French historian and journalist.
- Louis Edwards, 65, English football executive, heart attack.
- Kenneth Forbes, 87, Canadian painter.
- Hugh H. Goodwin, 79, American naval admiral.
- Wilton E. Hall, 78, American politician, member of the U.S. Senate (1944–1945).
- Robert Hayden, 66, American poet and essayist, heart disease.
- Eino Palovesi, 75, Finnish politician.
- Arthur Poister, 81, American organist.
- Caradog Prichard, 75, Welsh poet and novelist.
- Andrew Stephen, 73, Scottish physician and football executive.

=== 26 ===
- Hobart Amstutz, 83, American Methodist prelate.
- A. J. Arkell, 81, British archaeologist.
- Josie Billie, 92, American Seminole doctor and preacher.
- Alexander Brook, 81, American artist, heart attack.
- Don Evans, 70, New Zealand Olympic runner (1932).
- W. Horsley Gantt, 87, American physiologist and psychiatrist.
- William F. Ladd, 84, American general.
- Mario Mattoli, 81, Italian filmmaker.
- Ahmad Shukeiri, 72, Palestinian politician.
- Virendra Swarup, 56, Indian politician.

=== 27 ===
- Václav Robert Bozděch, 67, Czech-British RAF pilot.
- Edgar Cunningham, 69, American scout, first African-American Eagle Scout.
- Amy Gilbert, 85, American historian.
- Shin'ichi Hisamatsu, 90, Japanese philosopher and tea master.
- Kola Kwariani, 77, Georgian-American professional wrestler and chess player, bludgeoned.
- Philip Le Gros, 87, English cricketer.
- Cyril Le Marquand, 77, Jersey politician and businessman.
- Jeannie Mills, 40, American cult defector (Peoples Temple), shot.
- Teddy Roseboom, 83, Scottish footballer.
- Tobia Senoner, 66, Italian Olympic skier (1936).
- Mananti Sitompul, 70, Indonesian politician.
- Billy Spence, c. 55–56, Northern Irish loyalist.
- George Tobias, 78, American actor, bladder cancer.

=== 28 ===
- Michael Astor, 63, British politician, MP (1945–1951).
- Piero Bargellini, 82, Italian politician.
- Costante Bonazza, 55, Polish-Italian footballer.
- Enrique Campos del Toro, 81, Puerto Rican lawyer and politician, prostate cancer.
- Guilly d'Herbemont, 91, French inventor (white cane).
- Frank Davis, 79, Australian politician, MP (1949–1966).
- Dinorá de Carvalho, 84, Brazilian pianist and composer.
- James Goff, 67, American baseball player.
- Ron Jackson, 60, English footballer.
- Jadwiga Jędrzejowska, 67, Polish tennis player.
- Jock MacGregor, 75, Canadian Olympic boxer (1924).
- Hans Nätscher, 83, German trade unionist.
- G. W. L. Nicholson, 78, British-Canadian soldier and historian.
- Ian Peebles, 72, British cricketer and journalist.
- Emanuel Prüll, 83, Czech Olympic swimmer (1920).
- Johnny Reid, 83, Scottish footballer.
- K. Santhanam, 84–85, Indian politician.
- William Waite, 62, American musicologist.

=== 29 ===
- Yigal Allon, 61, Israeli politician, deputy (1968–1974) and acting prime minister (1969), cardiac arrest.
- Herm Bagby, 77, American football player.
- Bertha Louise Douglass, 85, American lawyer and civil rights activist.
- Gil Elvgren, 65, American painter, cancer.
- Werner Keller, 70, German historian and civil servant.
- Vierling C. Kersey, 90, American educator.
- Doug Kistler, 41, American basketball player, traffic collision.
- Alexander Mironenko, 20, Soviet military pilot, self-fragging.
- Margaret Morris, 88, British dancer and choreographer.
- Nino Oliviero, 62, Italian composer.
- P.L. Prattis, 84, American journalist.
