= Heavey =

Heavey is a surname. Notable people bearing it include:

- Aidan Heavey (born 1953), Irish chief executive
- John Heavey (1868–1948), Roman Catholic bishop
- John W. Heavey (1867–1941), United States Army general
- Martin Heavey (born 1943), Irish Gaelic footballer
- Margaret Heavey (1908–1980), Irish academic
- William F. Heavey (1896–1974), American brigadier general
