= Norfolk Mission College =

American Presbyterian school (1882–1916)

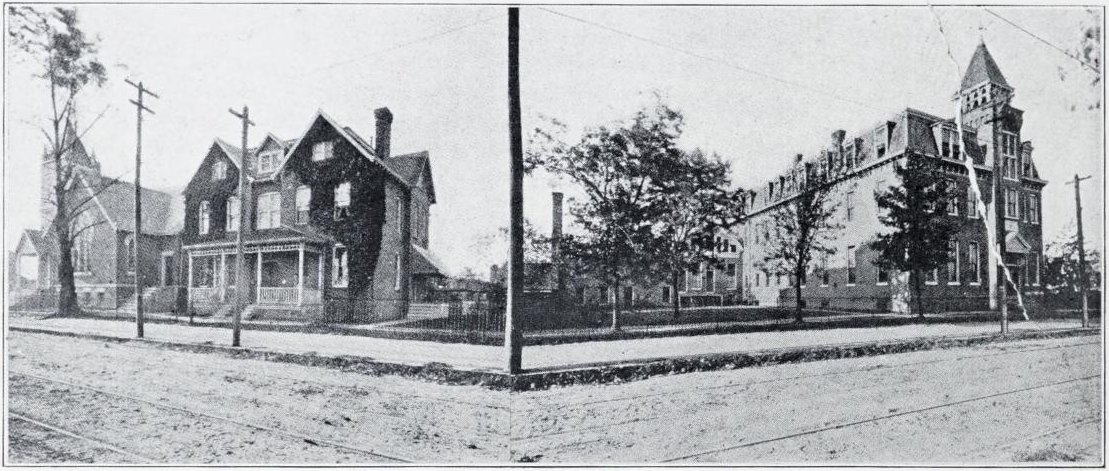
Norfolk Mission College in Norfolk, Virginia in 1908.

The Norfolk Mission College (NMC) was a privately-funded public school for African American students in the Norfolk, Virginia area. The school was established by the United Presbyterians and the first class started in 1883. NMC taught thousands of students at various levels of education and provided for students who could not afford the fifty cent tuition. The school lasted until 1916 and was then sold to the Norfolk school board and turned into Booker T. Washington High School.After the new Booker T. Washington High School opened in 1924, the building became Paul Laurence Dunbar Elementary School. In 1955, that building was demolished and now the Blyden Branch of the Norfolk Public Library is located on the same spot.

== About ==
The Norfolk Mission College (NMC) was located on Princess Anne Road in Norfolk, Virginia and included two buildings for classes, a school dormitory, a church and a home for the school's principal. The United Presbyterians founded the school in 1882 when Reverend Matthew Clark discovered a need for African-American schools in Norfolk in 1882. The school started out teaching 467 students in the first year, when classes started in January of 1883. After that, the school taught significantly more students, with there being 1,050 students enrolled in 1884. The first principal was Reverend Clarke who worked for the Freedmen's Mission of the United Presbyterians board. The first class of NMC graduated in May of 1888.

The school charged tuition, which was around 50 cents, though waived the fee for students who could not afford to pay. NMC educated African-American students and was the first privately funded public school for black students in Norfolk. Curriculum taught at the school included the usual subjects, such as math, science and history and also included Latin and classes on the Bible. The school taught primary level classes, intermediate grades and high school level classes.

When enrollment decreased, the United Presbyterian church sold the school in 1916 or 1917. The school was purchased by the school board in Norfolk and the John T. West High School was moved there. Later, the school was known as the Booker T. Washington High School. The building was demolished in 1955 and the Blyden Branch of the Norfolk Public Library is now located on the same spot as the original college. Before the building was demolished, graduates of NMC used to hold an annual reunion at the former college.

== Notable students ==
- L. Eudora Ashburne (1887–1992), physician.
- Bertha Louise Douglass (1895–1980), lawyer and civil rights activist.
- James Wormley Jones (1884–1958), FBI special agent.
- Cecil Mack (1873–1944), composer.
- Sarah Spencer Washington (1889–1953), businesswoman.
