= Costante =

Costante is a masculine Italian given name. Notable people with the name include:

- Costante Adolfo Bossi (1876–1953), Italian organist, composer and teacher
- Costante Bonazza (1924–1980), Polish-Italian footballer
- Costante Degan (1930–1988), Italian politician
- Costante Girardengo (1893–1978), Italian road bicycle racer
- Costante Maltoni (1915–1980), Italian prelate of the Catholic Church
- Costante Tencalla (1593–1646), Swiss-Italian architect and sculptor
- Orazio Costante Grossoni (1867–1952), Italian sculptor
- Pietro Costante Cardin (1922–2020), Italian-French fashion designer

== See also ==
- Stadio Costante Girardengo, a football stadium located in Novi Ligure, Italy
