= Burlton (surname) =

Origin
- Origin: English, Anglo-Saxon
- Meaning: derived from Burh meaning "Stronghold" or "Fortress", “ul or hyll” meaning hill and "tun – ton" meant "settlement" or "enclosure"
- Region of origin: England, Dorset

Other names
- Popularity: see popular names

Burlton is an English surname, the Burlton surname has an English origin first found in Dorset, between the late 500s and early 700 AD expansion period of the Anglo-Saxons. Early forms of the surname appeared during the early Anglo-Saxon and Medieval England period, in the then, Kingdom of Wessex. The surname has been in use for over 1600 years and is still in use to date.

Burlton, found mainly in the United Kingdom is a relatively rare surname.

== Burlton surname history ==
Due to the Burlton surname existing throughout different periods of European history, The form and meaning of the surname has different variations for different times of history. The surname has Anglo-Saxon, Viking Age, and Early Medieval England origins.

Before the end of the Anglo-Saxon era the English language had no fast system of spelling rules. For that reason, spelling variations are commonly found in early Anglo-Saxon surnames. 'Burlton' is a surname with multiple different variations.

Before English spelling was standardized a few hundred years ago, spelling variations of names were a common occurrence. Elements of Latin, French and other languages became incorporated into English through the Middle Ages, and name spellings changed even among the literate. The variations of the surname Burlton include Burleson, Burleston, Burlison, Burlyson, Burlson and many more

=== Family Seat & Coat of Arms ===
During the Middle Ages and from very early times, The Burlton family held a Family seat, Heraldic in Dorset.

Dorset was where the Burlton surname first originated from and where The Family seat position was granted from, providing them their own coat of arms.

== Notable people with the Burlton surname include ==
- Arthur Burlton (1900–1980), English cricketer
- George Burlton (died 1815), Royal Navy admiral
