= Bonazza =

Bonazza is an Italian surname. Notable people with the surname include:

- Antonio Bonazza (1698 – c.1762), Italian sculptor of the Rococo
- Costante Bonazza (1924–1980), Polish-Italian footballer
