= Cassi Chandler =

Former American FBI spokesperson and special agent

Cassandra "Cassi" McWilliams Chandler (born ca 1958) is a retired special agent and spokesperson for the United States Federal Bureau of Investigation. She was the first woman to be appointed an assistant director of the FBI's Office of Public Affairs and the first African-American woman to be named a special agent in charge of a field office.

== Biography ==
Cassandra Chandler
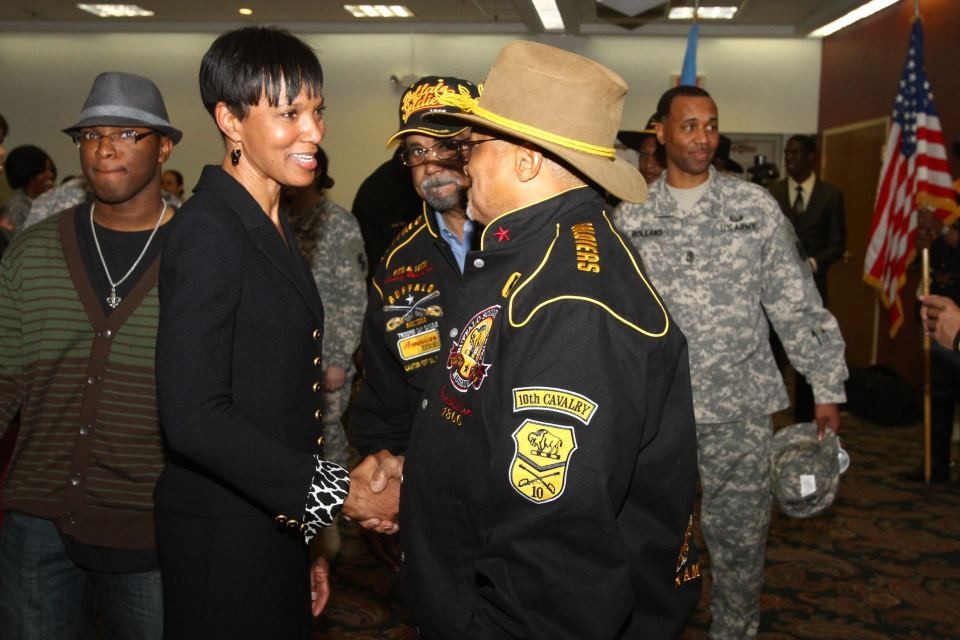
- Cassandra Chandler speaking at Fort Sill in honor of Black History Month, 2012
- Born: Cassandra McWilliams
- Education: Louisiana State University, Journalism and English; Loyola University New Orleans College of Law J.D.
- Years active: 1985–2008
- Employer: Federal Bureau of Investigation
- Known for: FBI Agent
- Spouse: Special Agent C. Carl Chandler
- Children: 1
- Website: https://www.vigeoalliance.com/cassi-chandler

Cassandra McWilliams grew up in Compton, Los Angeles. When she was eight years old, her single mother moved the family to Geismar, Louisiana. As a child, she grew up wanting to be an attorney, thanks to her mother's urging.

Cassandra McWilliams went on to major in journalism and English at Louisiana State University, with the ambition of becoming a television news anchor before attending law school. As she planned, McWilliams went on to work as a television reporter and news anchor for a NBC affiliate in Baton Rouge, Louisiana. She spent several years on-air before attending Loyola Law School in New Orleans. After receiving her Juris Doctor, McWilliams worked as a lawyer for the United States Army Corps of Engineers.

=== FBI agent ===
While attending law school, McWilliams was working part time in a newsroom when a suspected bank robber called the station asking to be put on the news. Instead, the station manager encouraged her to call the FBI. The experience piqued her interest in a law enforcement career.

In 1985, she became a special agent with the FBI. Shortly after joining the agency, she married her husband, Carl Chandler, also a Special Agent at the FBI.

Her first postings were to the New Orleans and then the Los Angeles field offices, where it was rare for a woman, and especially a black woman, to be a FBI special agent.

Chandler described an early encounter in the field:

"I remember once while a new agent in New Orleans, I was working on huge financial institution fraud cases. Well, I needed help carrying boxes to the office. I asked a couple of guys in the office for help. The senior officer looked at me and said, 'Can you carry those boxes up?' I said yes. He then asked if I was a special agent and I said yes. Finally he said, 'Do you carry a badge and gun like the rest of us?' I said yes. So he told me that I was capable of bringing the boxes up myself. At first I was mad. He later took me aside and said, 'You don't want to develop a reputation that shows others you can't do the job because you're a woman.' From that day forward, I carried myself like a special agent. I walked in being like everybody else and people respected that"

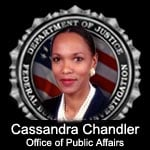

In 1994, she was named as a supervisor of white collar crimes in the San Diego field office. There, she focused on cross-border crimes such as kidnappings and healthcare fraud.

After serving 14 years as an agent, in 1997 Chandler became the assistant special agent in charge of the San Francisco Field Office. At the time, she became the FBI's highest ranking African-American woman in the field. In San Francisco, Chandler specialized in financial crimes and health care fraud.

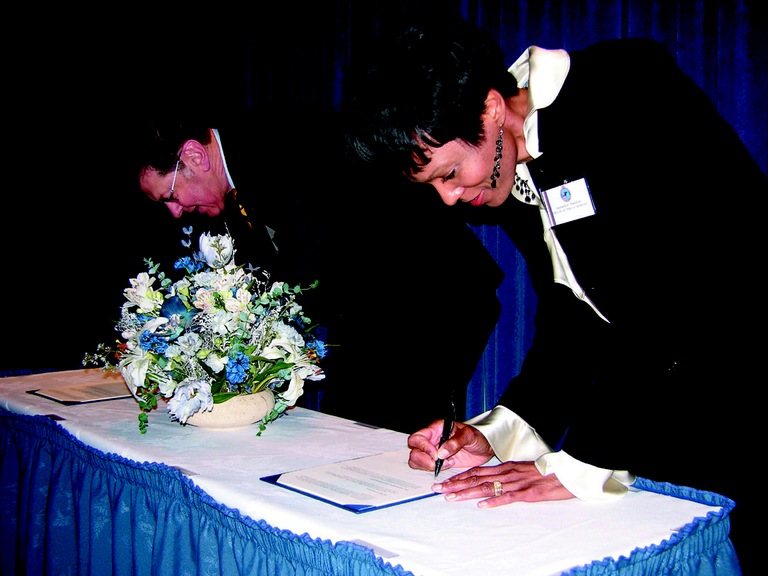
Cassandra Chandler serving as FBI Office of Public Affairs Assistant Director in 2005

In 2002, she was named the Assistant Director for Training at the FBI, where she oversaw advanced training for thousands of the Bureau's employees. In 2003, Chandler was appointed the assistant director of the FBI's Office of Public Affairs, becoming the first woman to hold the post. In this role, she became the first woman to serve as a national spokesperson for the FBI.

In 2005, Robert S. Mueller III appointed Chandler as the special agent in charge of the FBI's field office in Norfolk, Virginia. She would be the first black woman to lead the office.

=== Later career ===
Chandler retired from the FBI in 2008 after 23 years of service. Over the course of her career at the FBI, she received the "Presidential Rank of Meritorious Executive Award,” the National Center for Women and Policing’s “Breaking the Glass Ceiling” Award, and the National Organization of Black Law Enforcement Executives’ “Phenomenal Woman” Community Service Award.

Interview with Cassandra Chandler produced by the FBI, 2012

After retiring from the FBI, In 2008, Cassi Chandler joined Bank of America to work in the bank's health care and insurance fraud divisions. After her retirement, Chandler founded Vigeo Alliance, a company focusing on leadership and risk management. Today she serves as a speaker on managing risk and executive leadership.

== See also ==
- Sylvia E. Mathis, first black woman special agent at the Federal Bureau of Investigation
- James Wormley Jones, recognized as the first African-American special agent at the Federal Bureau of Investigation
