= Virginia Beach Police Department =

Police Department in Virginia Beach, Virginia

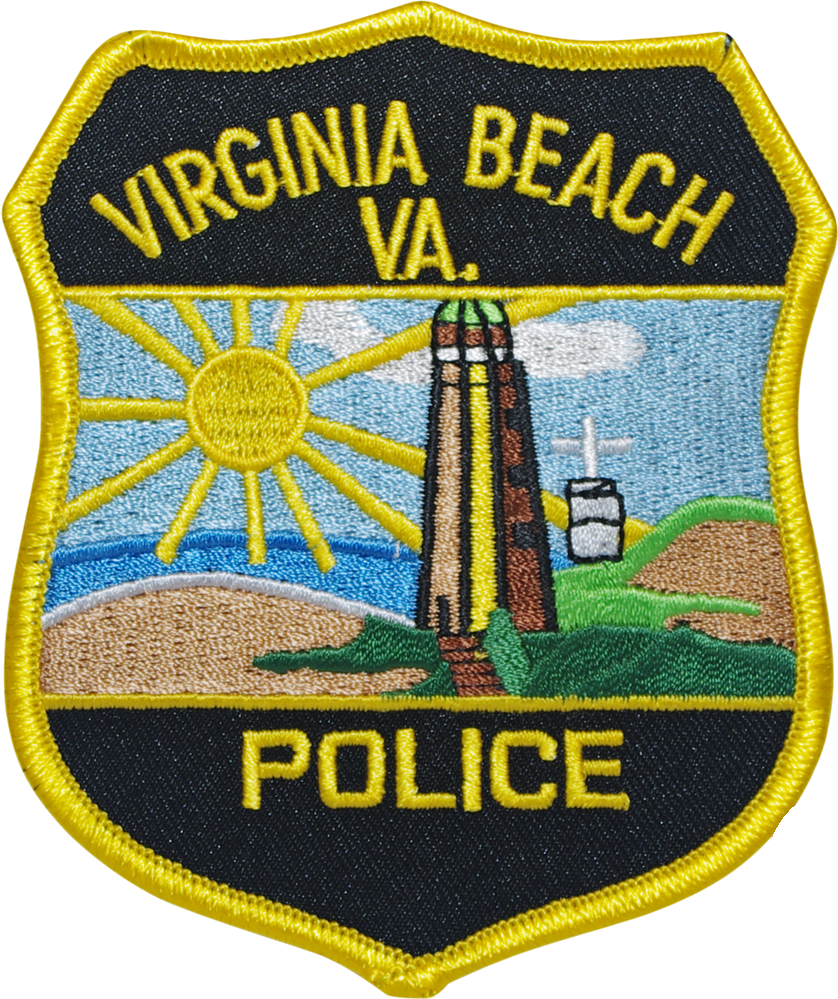

- Abbreviation: VBPD
- Motto: Pride, Integrity, Commitment

Agency overview
- Formed: 1963; 63 years ago
- Preceding agency: Princess Anne County Police Department
- Employees: 1,000
- Volunteers: 400
- Annual budget: $123 million USD (2023)

Jurisdictional structure
- Operations jurisdiction: United States
- Population: 451,637 (2024)
- Legal jurisdiction: City of Virginia Beach

Operational structure
- Headquarters: 2509 Princess Anne Road, Virginia Beach, VA 23456
- Agency executives: Paul Neudigate, Chief of Police; Sean Adams, Deputy Chief; Shannon Wichtendahl, Deputy Chief; Jeffery Wilkerson, Deputy Chief; William Zelms, Deputy Chief

Facilities
- Precincts: First Precinct; Second Precinct; Third Precinct; Fourth Precinct

Website
- police.virginiabeach.gov

The Virginia Beach Police Department is the primary law enforcement agency of Virginia Beach, Virginia. The department hires over 1,000 officers and civilians. The VBPD is headquartered in Building 11, at 2405 Courthouse Dr, and services four police precincts that the VBPD services. Each precinct is further divided into zones for officers to patrol. They are simply named First, Second, Third, and Fourth Precincts. The VBPD services the roughly 450,000 residents of the city, which is the largest in the state, surpassing the capital city of Richmond.

== History ==
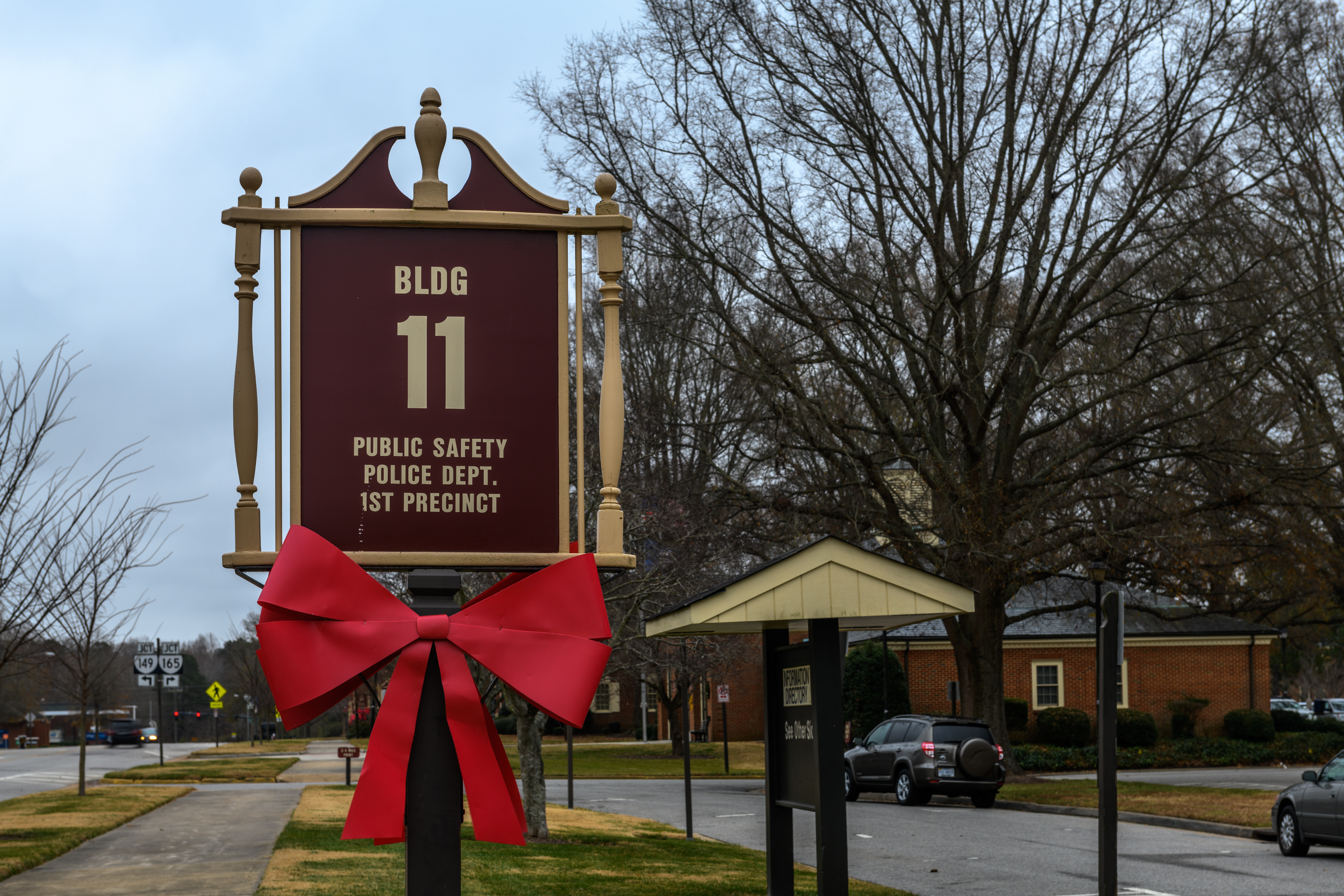
Headquarters of the VBPD

English colonists at Jamestown, led by Christopher Newport, first arrived in Hampton Roads in 1607. They had been chartered by the Virginia Company of London to set up a colony in the New World. To keep the peace, martial law, which lasted until 1619, was established in 1609 by the colony's leadership. Princess Anne County, the predecessor to the present-day City of Virginia Beach, was first incorporated into Virginia in 1691. In 1938, Robert E. W. Sparrow became the county's first black police officer. In 1963, the old City of Virginia Beach was merged with Princess Anne County, thereby creating the modern independent city. The resources of the Princess Anne County Police Department and City of Virginia Beach Police Department were merged into the Virginia Beach Police Department.

In 2012, artist Paul DiPasquale created a memorial dedicated to deceased members of the Virginia Beach Police Department, Virginia Beach Sheriff's Office, and the state and federal agencies that protect the city. Names of officers are engraved in the base of the memorial. There are individual plaques that explain more about each officer. In 2019, the Fourth Precinct's old building, adjacent to the Kempsville Area Library, was replaced with a new one behind the library. The new building was designed to be a "citizen-centered" facility, featuring gender-neutral bathrooms, a fitness room, and LED lighting.

=== Controversies ===
The Virginia Beach Police Department has been the subject of multiple controversies over the years since its 1963 inception. On Independence Day in 1976, the bicentennial of America's founding, riots erupted after bars closed at 1 in the morning. Hundreds of people clashed with police, before finally being dispersed with tear gas and K-9 units. As a result of the incident, 11 officers were injured, and 78 people were arrested. In 1989, riots and looting broke out during Labor Day weekend, in what would become known as the Greekfest riots. A police horse was killed after it was hit in the head by an object thrown from a balcony. The VBPD abandoned the oceanfront and returned in riot gear. By dawn, the Virginia National Guard had arrived to finally quell the riots. Over 650 people were arrested.

In 1991, a survey conducted by the Virginian-Pilot and Ledger-Star newspapers found a pattern of abuse among VBPD officers. Officers used unreasonable amounts of force to restrain people suspected of minor crimes. A total of 25 people said that they had been subject to police violence. In 2007, a 10-pound training bomb fell from a Navy fighter jet. Both the VBPD and local military police responded to the scene. There were no casualties. In 2015, in the case of Wilis v. City of Virginia Beach, officers sued the VBPD on grounds that their employer disciplined them after they reported gender discrimination. The case was dismissed by the Chief Judge Rebecca Beach Smith. In 2019, a disgruntled man walked into Building 2 of the Virginia Beach Municipal Center and opened fire. Twelve people, most of them city employees, were killed in the incident. Following the shooting, the FBI provided "significant law enforcement assistance" to the VBPD's investigation of the shooting.

In 2022, officers were found to have used forged DNA reports in interrogations to get confessions from five people. The incidents occurred from March 2016 to February 2020. When questioned by The Washington Post, the department said that what happened, "though legal, was not in the spirit of what the community expects." In 2024, in the case of Banks v. City of Virginia Beach, an officer sued the VBPD, claiming that he had been investigated and demoted for trying to address allegations of discrimination. The complaint was filed in the U.S. District Court, and the case was presided over by Senior Judge Raymond Alvin Jackson. An officer was arrested and charged with several crimes: attempted indecent liberties with a child less than 15 years of age, attempted indecent liberties, enticing a minor to perform in child pornography, proposition of sex act by communication system with a child less than 15 years of age, solicitation to commit a felony and possession of child pornography. The documents did not say if it was one person or multiple.

== See also ==
- List of law enforcement agencies in Virginia
- Virginia Beach, Virginia
- Virginia Beach City Council
