= L. Eudora Ashburne =

American physician

Lydia Evans
- Born: c. 1887
- Died: January 14, 1992 (aged c. 105); Chicago, Illinois, United States
- Occupation: physician
- Spouse: Theodore Evans

Lydia Eudoria Ashburne Evans (c. 1887 – January 14, 1992) was an African-American female physician. In 1912 she became the first African-American woman to graduate from Howard University School of Medicine and the first African-American woman licensed as a general practitioner in Virginia, following Sarah Garland Boyd Jones's 1893 licensure as the first African-American woman certified by the Virginia State Medical Examining Board.

== Biography ==
Ashburne was born around 1887. She grew up in Bowers Hill, Virginia and was part of a big family of fourteen siblings. Her parents had been formerly enslaved people. Ashburne graduated from Norfolk Mission College in 1908 and went on to earn her medical degree from Howard University Medical School in 1912. Ashburne briefly practiced medicine in Virginia. She moved to Chicago in 1916 and worked there as a physician for around 65 years. She provided charity work for many people in Chicago. Ashburne created the South Side office of the United Cerebral Palsy. Later in life she married Theodore R. P. Evans. She died on January 14, 1992, in Hyde Park.
