= Sara Spencer Washington =

American entrepreneur, philanthropist (1889–1953)

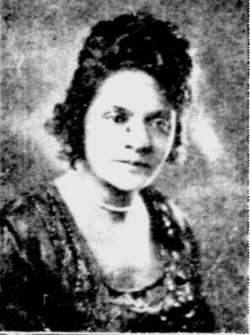
Sara Spencer Washington, from a 1921 publication.

Sara Spencer Washington (June 17, 1883 – March 23, 1953) was the founder of Apex News and Hair Company and was honored at the 1939 New York World's Fair as one of the "Most Distinguished Businesswomen" for her Apex empire of beauty products, schools, and publishing. Washington gave back to her community and fought back against racial discrimination, whether delivering coal to her neighbors in Atlantic City, New Jersey or building the Apex Golf Club, one of the first African-American owned golf courses in the nation.

== Early life ==
Sarah Elizabeth Phillips was born in the Norfolk, Virginia neighborhood of Berkley on June 17, 1883, to Ellen Phillips. As a girl, she attended public schools in the Berkley area before going to the Lincoln Preparatory School in Philadelphia, Pennsylvania and Norfolk Mission College in Norfolk, Virginia. Many sources claim that Washington studied business at Northwestern College and at Columbia University, but archival records cannot verify this.

Sara first discovered a passion for haircare when she worked as a dressmaker in York, Pennsylvania. Returning to Norfolk, she opened a salon before enrolling in Marie E. Joyce's School and completing a course in 1912. In 1913, she opened her own small salon in Atlantic City, New Jersey.

== Career ==
In 1913, Washington founded the Apex News and Hair Company in Atlantic City, New Jersey and began her career as a cosmetics entrepreneur. She experimented with a variety of cosmetic products, targeting the market of African American women. While she started in a one-room beauty shop, she grew her business into an empire by working in her beauty salon during the day and canvassing for her cosmetic products at night.

The Apex Company encompassed a variety of products, from pressing oils, hot combs, and pomades for hair to perfumes, beauty creams, and lipsticks. Washington recognized the value in the beauty industry and considered it one of the best professions to enter. She is known for saying, "As long as there are women in the world, there will be beauty establishments."

Indeed, the products that Washington recognized surfaced in the United States. The Apex empire included eleven different beauty schools in the United States, with schools in foreign countries that specialized in teaching with her products. It is estimated that Washington's company employed nearly five hundred people in her stores across the nation, in addition to the estimated forty-five thousand sales agents who canvassed Apex beauty products as Washington had in her early days.

While Washington did not pioneer the beauty industry, she emerged into the beauty market after the world had suffered from World War I and the Great Depression. She has been celebrated for coining the slogan, "Now is the time to plan your future by learning a depression-proof business." While Washington's company started as a one-room beauty shop, it is estimated to have been worth nearly half-a-million dollars by the mid-1940s.

== Family ==
Sara lived with her mother and step-father, Richard Smith, in the Norfolk area until the early 1900s. Sara's father is mentioned as Joshua Douglas on her marriage certificate, but he does not appear to have played a role in her life. She was very close with her mother, and Ellen later came to live in Atlantic City with Sara.

After moving to Atlantic City in about 1905, Sara met and married John Spencer. Their marriage ended in divorce in 1916. Sara then married Isaac Washington in 1917. Although they also divorced, Sara's professional name reflected the names of her previous partners, and she was known as Sara Spencer Washington. Later in life, she married Shumpert Logan in 1949. Logan was an employee of the Apex company and also the head of Apex Golf and Country Club.

Sara adopted a young cousin and raised her as her daughter, Sara Joan Cross Washington (1927-2005). After the elder Sara's death, her daughter inherited the majority share of the Apex business until it merged with Pharmetics in 1959.

== Later years ==
Washington suffered from diabetes-related complications during her later years. In 1943 and again in 1947, she was hospitalized after a stroke. Each time she returned to her busy schedule of running the Apex empire, philanthropy, and community involvement. In January 1953 her health again declined. She died on March 23, 1953 in Atlantic City, New Jersey. Her death was widely marked and obituaries and tributes appeared in various newspapers and magazines, such as Jet, Miami Herald, Baltimore Afro-American, The New York Age, The Atlantic City Press, The Courier-Post (Camden), and The Virginian-Pilot (Norfolk). The New Jersey State Senate issued a resolution commemorating her as “an international citizen of merit.” She is interred at the Atlantic City Cemetery in Pleasantville, New Jersey.

== Legacy ==
In 1939, Washington was recognized for her company at the 1939 New York World's Fair. Washington's empire had expanded from the Apex Beauty Products Company to the Apex News and Hair Company, the Apex Publishing Company, which published the Apex News for Washington's estheticians and sales agents, Apex Laboratories which created her cosmetics and products, Apex Drug Company, and Apex Beauty Colleges.

Washington's international recognition from her 1939 award enhanced both her business empire and the status of African American women, as her business empire had enabled her to become one of America's first black millionaires. Washington's success enabled her to give back to her community. She contributed twenty acres of farm land as a campsite for African American youth, and gave an endowment of a home for girls, supporting the educational elements of the National Youth Administration program. There is a historical marker in Atlantic City in the neighborhood where Madam Washington lived and operated Apex.

One of the most successful and long-standing schools was The Apex College of Beauty in Philadelphia, remaining progressive for decades. As of the 1980s, it became the country's oldest black institution of beauty technology.

== See also ==
Year	Title
1865 1946	Anthony Overton
1877 1957	Annie Turnbo Malone
1867 1919	Madam C. J. Walker
