= Louis Cass =

American rugby union player (b. 1889)

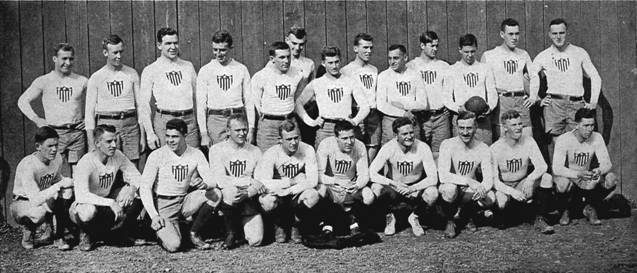
- Cass with the US team in 1913 (pictured front row, fourth from right)
- Born: November 16, 1889 Los Angeles, California, US
- Died: August 7, 1971 (aged 81) Los Angeles, California, US
- School: Los Angeles High School
- University: Stanford University

Rugby union career
- Position: Scrum-half
Amateur team(s)
Years	Team	Apps	(Points)
1910–1913	Stanford University		
1915	Southern California All-Stars		
- Correct as of December 28, 2018
International career
Years	Team	Apps	(Points)
1912–1913	United States	1	(0)
- Correct as of December 28, 2018

Louis Cass (November 16, 1889 – August 7, 1971) was an American rugby union player who played at scrum-half for the United States men's national team in its first capped match against New Zealand in 1913.

== Biography ==
Cass was born on November 16, 1889, in Los Angeles, California, the son and third of eight children of Alonzo Beecher Cass and Emily Flora Cass (born Tufts). In 1907, Cass' mother died. Cass attended Los Angeles High School, and was quarterback of school's football team that won the California state championship in 1908.

Cass began attending Stanford University in 1910 and was a member of the university's rugby teams. Cass did not play with the varsity team in 1910 or 1911 due to injury, but served as captain for the Stanford team during the 1912 and 1913 seasons (his junior and senior years, respectively). In 1912, he was a member of the United States team that played against Australia in its first test match on November 16, but he did not make an appearance in that game. On November 15, 1913, Cass played for the United States at scrum-half in its first test match against New Zealand—a 51–3 defeat. In 1915, alongside fellow Stanford and United States rugby player Mow Mitchell, Cass was a member of a Southern California All-Star rugby team that played a series of matches against university and Northern California All-Star opposition in October and November of that year.

After attending Stanford, Cass founded an insurance company called Cass & Johansing. He married a woman named Virginia Nourse. Cass died on August 7, 1971, in Los Angeles at the age of 81.
