= Sylvia Mathis =

First African American woman FBI special agent (1949-1983)

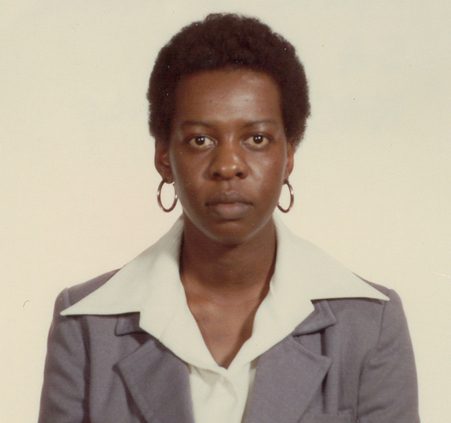
- Born: July 7, 1949; Jacksonville, Florida
- Died: October 22, 1983 (aged 34)
- Education: New York University Political science University of North Carolina School of Law Juris Doctor
- Occupations: Lawyer, law enforcement agent
- Years active: 1976–1979
- Employer(s): Federal Bureau of Investigation; Jacksonville Downtown Ecumenical Service Council
- Known for: First African-American woman to become an FBI Special Agent

Sylvia Elizabeth Mathis (July 7, 1949 – October 22, 1983) was the first African-American woman to become a Special Agent for the Federal Bureau of Investigation. After serving for three years, Mathis left the agency, later dying in a car accident.

== Biography ==
Mathis was born on July 7, 1949. She was raised in both North Carolina and Florida. In 1972, she graduated with a bachelors degree in Political Science from New York University, and in 1975 earned her J.D. from the University of North Carolina School of Law. Her law school dean encouraged her to apply to the FBI Academy.

Prior to joining the FBI Academy, Mathis shared,

“…I am interested in delving into the relation of defending of rights and enforcement of rights. Going into the FBI seemed like a natural step.”

Mathis arrived at the FBI Academy on February 17, 1976. She was a pioneer at the time. Only 41 of the Bureau's 8,500 agents were women.

After completing her training, Mathis received her badge and credentials as an FBI Special Agent on June 2, 1976. Her first posting was at the FBI's New York Field Office where she would join the organized crime squad.

In 1979, Mathis left the FBI to work as an attorney in New York. In 1982, she returned to Florida to care for her family. Mathis died in a car accident in at age 34 on October 22, 1983.

== See also ==
- James Wormley Jones, recognized as the first African-American Federal Bureau of Investigation special agent
- Cassandra Chandler, first African-American woman to lead an FBI field office, first woman to be the FBI's national spokesperson
