= Joe De Medici =

Australian rules footballer

Personal information
- Full name: Joe De Medici
- Born: 28 May 1920
- Died: 12 February 1980 (aged 59)
- Original team: Lilydale
- Height: 180 cm (5 ft 11 in)
- Weight: 77 kg (170 lb)

Playing career^{1}
Years	Club	Games (Goals)
1941–42	Footscray	10 (16)
1944	South Melbourne	5 (3)
Total		15 (19)
- ^{1} Playing statistics correct to the end of 1944.

Joe De Medici (28 May 1920 – 12 February 1980) was a former Australian rules footballer who played with Footscray and South Melbourne in the Victorian Football League (VFL).
