= Marius Lavet =

French electrical engineer (1894–1980)

- Born: February 7, 1894; Clermont-Ferrand, Auvergne, France
- Died: February 11, 1980 (aged 86); Paris, Île-de-France, France
- Education: Supélec; Arts et Métiers ParisTech
- Occupation: Engineer
- Known for: Stepper motor
- Awards: Knight of the Legion of Honour; Price Haag (1969); Prize of the Academy of Sciences (1971); Golden Badge of the 9th International Congress chronometry (1972); Nessim Habif Prize (1976)

Marius Lavet (February 8, 1894 in Clermont-Ferrand – February 14, 1980 in Paris) was a French engineer who invented in 1936 the principle of stepper motor. He studied at Supélec, the School of Electric Power, French private engineering school.

A stepper motor can turn an electrical impulse into angular movement. This type of engine is very common in all devices where it is desirable to control the speed or position in open loop, usually in positioning systems. The invention of Lavet is enshrined in French Patent FR823395 and was instrumental, among other applications, for the development of watches with quartz mechanisms, using the principle known as the piezoelectric. Quartz watches dominate the world market today, due to their low price and high precision.
