= Bertha Louise Douglass =

American civil-rights activist and lawyer

Bertha Louise Douglass (January 26, 1895 – February 29, 1980) was an American civil rights activist and lawyer who was the second African American woman admitted to the Virginia State Bar.

== Early life and education ==
Bertha L. Douglass was born in 1895 in Norfolk, Virginia, the daughter of John H. Douglass and Margaret Anne Cornick Douglass. She attended public schools and graduated from Norfolk Mission College in 1915.

== Career ==
=== Law ===
In 1917, Douglass began working as a stenographer for John Eugene Diggs, one of Norfolk's few African American attorneys. Douglass became a Virginia Notary Public in 1919.

Douglass enrolled in the American Correspondence School of Law in 1922. She passed the bar examination in 1926, and became the second African American woman admitted to practice law in Virginia, and the first Black female lawyer in Norfolk. After becoming a lawyer, Douglass began working as an attorney in Diggs' law firm. In the practice, she specialized in civil law, wills, and federal pension cases.

During the 1930s, Douglass served as president of the Norfolk County Bar Association. During the 1940s, Douglass served two terms as Virginia vice president of the National Association of Women Lawyers. Douglass also served on the board of directors of the Old Dominion Bar Association.

During World War II, Douglass was a volunteer with the all-black Norfolk Auxiliary of the American Red Cross Motor Corps.

In 1949, Douglass opened her own law office. She served as general counsel for the Norfolk Association of Real Estate Brokers, an organization that worked to combat housing discrimination towards African American families. Outside of her law practice, Douglass was the owner and operator of the Eureka Real Estate Company from 1944 to 1974. She retired from practicing law in the late 1970s.

=== Civil rights activism ===
In the 1940s, Douglass encouraged African American women to register to vote, and was an active member of the Negro Women's Democratic Club of Norfolk. She also assisted African American women with paying poll taxes. Following the 1955 Brown v. Board of Education ruling, Douglass was a signatory to a petition to the Virginia General Assembly and Governor Thomas B. Stanley to desegregate Virginia's public schools.

In 1961, Douglass helped organized sit-ins at three major department stores in Virginia. She worked with the NAACP to support efforts to desegregate department stores.

== Death and legacy ==
Douglass died on February 29, 1980, and is interred at Calvary Cemetery in Norfolk. Her name is included on the Virginia Women's Monument wall of honor at the state capitol in Richmond.
