= John Sandwall =

Swedish fencer

Personal information
- Born: 26 December 1917 Åseda, Sweden
- Died: 17 February 1980 (aged 62)

Sport
- Sport: Fencing

John Sandwall (26 December 1917 – 17 February 1980) was a Swedish fencer. He competed in the team épée event at the 1956 Summer Olympics.
