= Amanda Snyder =

American painter

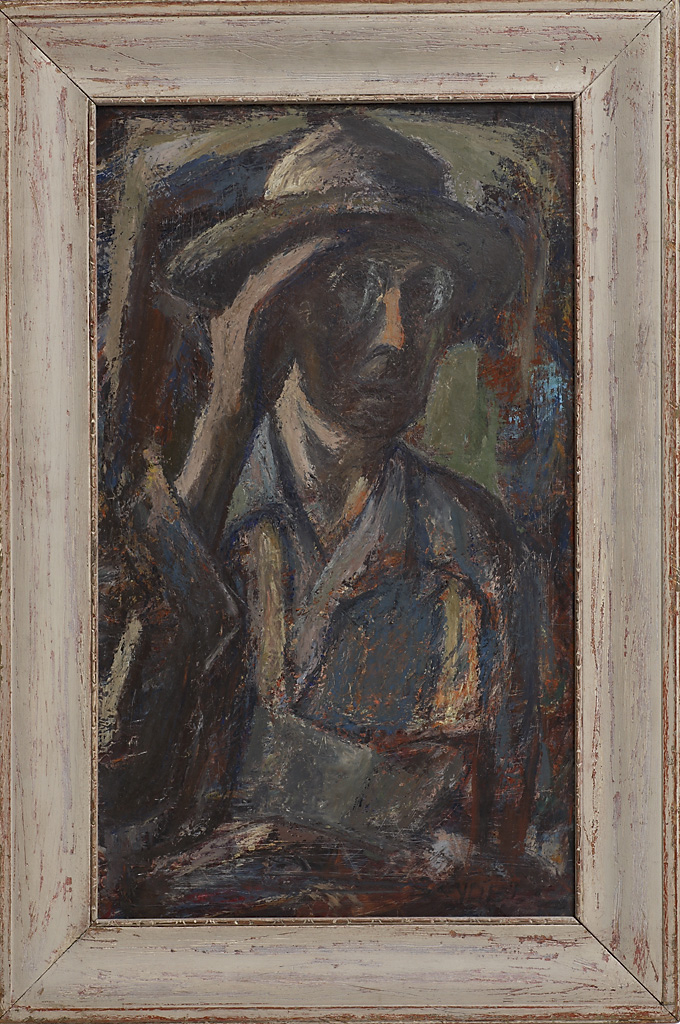
- Self-portrait, 1948
- Born: Amanda Viola Tester; March 15, 1894; Mountain City, Tennessee
- Died: February 3, 1980 (aged 85); Portland, Oregon
- Education: Portland Museum Art School
- Known for: Abstract compositions, portraits, paintings of birds, clowns, still life
- Movement: Early modern painters; Impressionism, Expressionism
- Spouse: Edmund Snyder

Amanda Viola Snyder, née Tester, (March 15, 1894 – February 3, 1980) was a contemporary American artist from Portland, Oregon. She produced hundreds of drawings, paintings and woodcuts, and held 32 solo exhibitions.

== Early life and education ==
Snyder was born near Mountain City, Tennessee, the eldest child of William Jefferson Tester and Della Lee (née Hull) Tester. When she was nine years old her family moved to Roseburg, Oregon. Even in elementary school she had an aptitude for art. She married Edmund Snyder on July 16, 1916, and they moved to Portland, Oregon. Their son Eugene was born in 1918.

In 1917 she attended classes at the Portland Museum Art School, and in 1925 Snyder studied portrait painting with English portraitist Sidney Bell.

== Career ==
As a primarily self-taught artist, Snyder developed her own variations of Impressionism and Expressionism. She has been described as "reclusive and dedicated," working alone in the basement of her home in Portland.

She exhibited in a four woman show in 1954 with Jolan Torak, LaVon Lucas, and LaVerne Krause at Portland's Kharouba Gallery.

She held 32 solo exhibits in her lifetime, and her works are in collections of Jordan Schnitzer Museum of Art, the Portland Art Museum, the Seattle Art Museum, the Hallie Ford Museum of Art, Reed College and the Oregon Historical Society.

== Critical reception ==
Museum docents Ginny Allen and Jody Klevit describe Snyder's style in Oregon Painters: the First Hundred Years (1859-1959):

Snyder liked the rough texture of many layers of paint softened by scumbling, using that technique to great effect. In 1929 she met Clayton Sumner Price at one of his gallery shows. He later informed her that her work, especially the clowns and religious paintings, had something in common with the French painter Rouault.

Allen and Klevit further describe the development of Snyder's style, "Over the years her style changed from realistic through impressionistic to the increasingly abstract." Snyder's landscape work is described in the exhibition notes for the "Picturing Oregon" exhibition of the Portland Art Museum: "Oregon’s leading artists often combined social realism with a modernist appropriation of cubism... Amanda Snyder employed cubist principles and the rain-darkened palette of the Northwest to create powerful geometric landscapes."

== Books by Amanda Snyder ==
- A Bookful of Birds
- Oregon Originals: The Art of Amanda Snyder & Jefferson Tester

== Selected works by Amanda Snyder ==
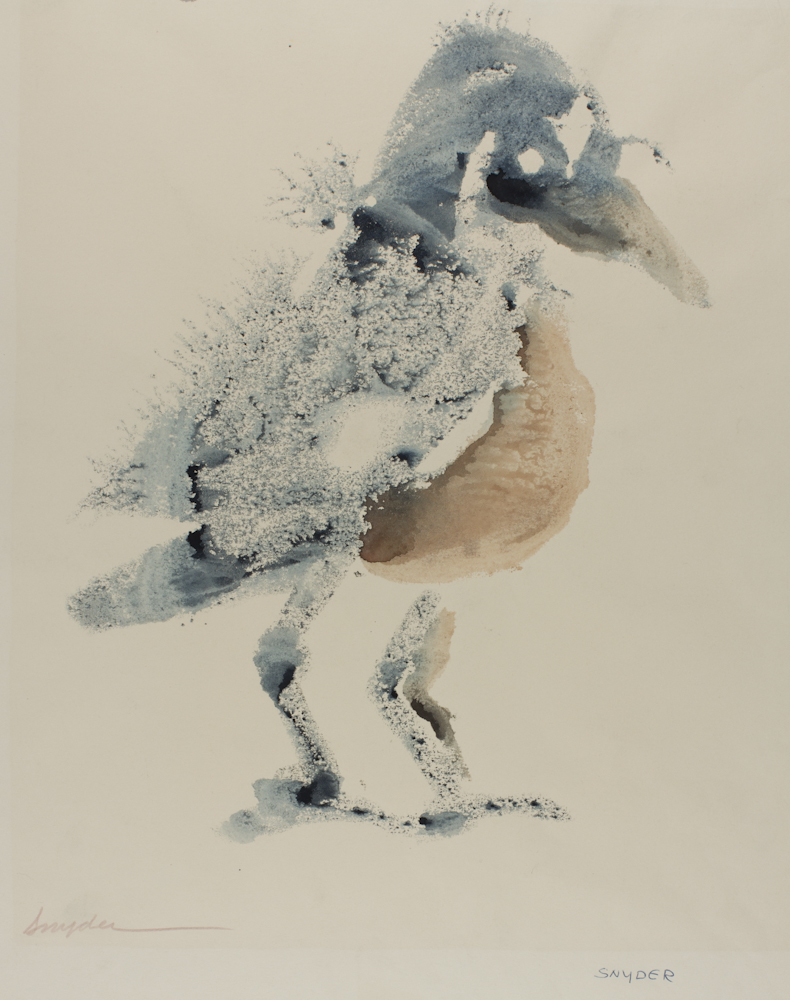
Young Robin by Snyder, ca. 1950

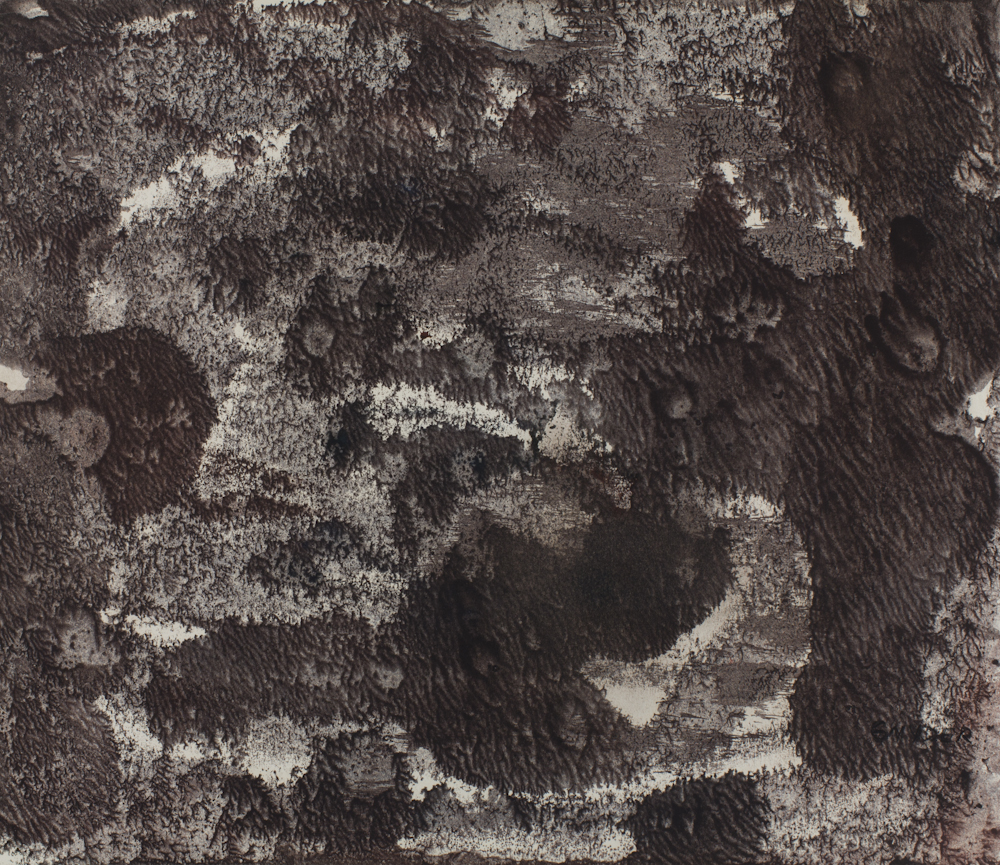
"Cave dwellers" by Amanda Snyder

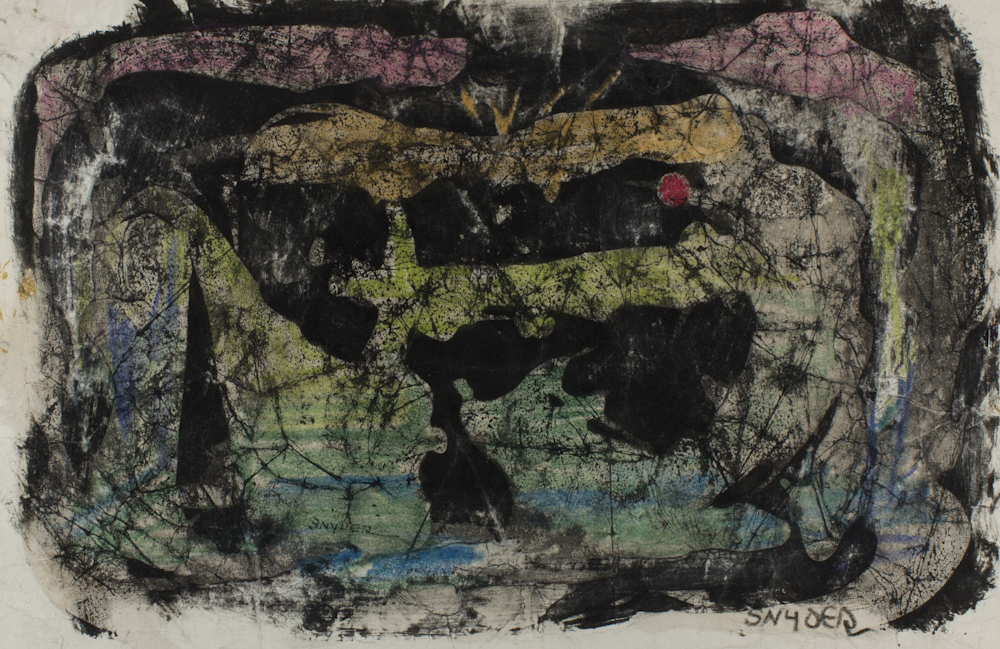
"Aquatic," by Amanda Snyder

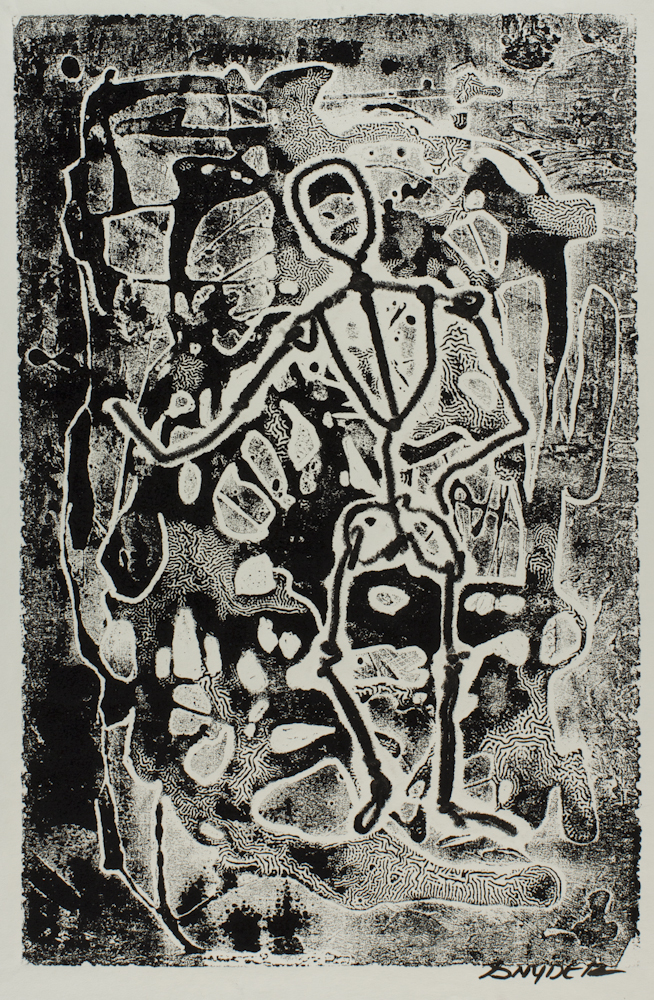
"Destiny" by Snyder
