= James Wormley Jones =

African-American FBI agent (1884–1958)

James Wormley Jones (September 22, 1884 – December 11, 1958) was an African-American policeman and World War I veteran, who is best known for having been the first African-American Federal Bureau of Investigation special agent.

== Early life ==
Jones was born in Fort Monroe, Virginia. At a young age, he moved with his family to Cambridge, Massachusetts, where he completed his early education. Returning to Virginia, he took up studies at Norfolk Mission College and a year later went to continue his education at Virginia Union University, though he did not graduate.

== Police career ==
Jones began service with the Washington Metropolitan Police Department in January 1905. He rose from being a footman to a horseman then a motorcycle policeman. His work resulted in him being promoted to detective. During this time he and his wife Ethel T. (Peters) Jones became the parents of three children. Their son John B. Jones was born in 1910. Another son, Amos W. Jones, was born in 1911. Their daughter Mildred Theodora Jones was born in 1915.

== Military exploits ==
In 1917 Jones joined the United States Army. He attended the Officers' Training School in Des Moines, Iowa, and once his training was complete he was given a commission as a captain. He was assigned to the 368th Infantry Regiment (United States), 92nd Division, in command of Company F.

After his company was sent to France in 1918, he saw action in the Vosges Mountains, Argonne Sector, and the Metz front.

"Neither can I individualize respecting the magnificent valor of the men of the company led by Captain Jones in this engagement, which Secretary Baker himself praised. When the awful bombardment died away, just as the gray streaks of early dawn pierced the night's blackness, which was made grayer by a thick heavy fog, the Captain ordered a charge 'over the top' with fixed bayonets; through the treacherous fog and into no-man-knew-what or seemed to care. The first wave, or detachment, went over with a cheer---a triumphant cheer---and the second wave followed their comrades with a dash. It may, perhaps, be best to let these boys and officers tell with their lips of the terrific, murderous shell, shrapnel, gas, and machine-gun fire that baptized them, only to make them the more hardened and intrepid warriors; of how they contended every inch; fought with marvelous valor, never for an instant faltering. Trench after trench of the enemy was entered and conquered; dugout after dugout was successfully grenade and made safe for the boys to follow; wires were cut and communicating trenches explored; machine-gun nests were raided and silenced, and still, the boys fought their way on. Of course, as a natural sequence to such a daring raid, there were casualties, but the black soldiers, heroes as they were, never flinched at death, and the wounded were too proud of their achievements even to murmur because of the pain they endured. Captain Jones and his men took over a mile of land and trenches which for four years had been held by the Germans. The newspapers have given due and proper credit to the Americans for this daring raid, but the world has not been informed that it was the colored soldiers of America, under Captain J. Wormley Jones, a former Washington, D. C. policeman, who made the charge that was as daring, and more successful, than the Tennyson-embalmed charge of 'The Light Brigade.'"

During that time he became an instructor with the 92nd Division School of Specialists. His work there resulted in his being promoted to senior instructor. With the war's end in 1918, he resigned from his post and resumed his work at the Metropolitan Police.

== FBI and Marcus Garvey ==
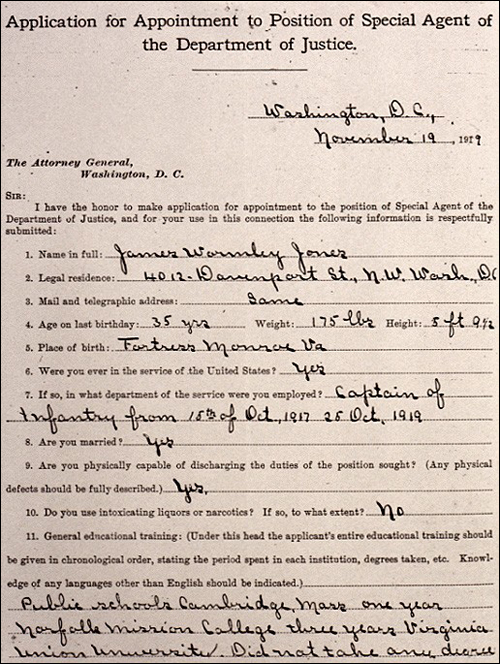
Jones's application to join the FBI

Jones was appointed as the first African-American special agent on November 19, 1919, by Bureau of Investigation director A. Bruce Bielaski. Jones was assigned to a new section of the Justice Department created to track the activities of groups perceived as subversive. His work there was under the direct supervision of J. Edgar Hoover.

During his time in the FBI, Jones served in New York City and Pittsburgh. In New York, he was assigned to infiltrate the Universal Negro Improvement Association under the leadership of Marcus Garvey. Although he was seeking evidence of subversive activities during the "Red Scare" of 1919, Jones' work led to the arrest and trial of Garvey on mail fraud charges.

While conducting his surveillance, Jones adopted the code number 800 for his reports and was also known as agent "800". He knew that his clandestine role was not well concealed. During a March 1920 speech at the UNIA Liberty Hall, he took special pains to point out to the audience that he was true of African ancestry, although he had the appearance of a person of Caucasian or European ancestry. Nevertheless, he engendered the trust of the UNIA leadership to such an extent that he was able to gain responsibility for registering all incoming correspondence. His access to UNIA correspondence and his position as Adjutant General in the African Legion were essential in enabling his information-gathering activities.

In August 1921 Jones began conducting similar surveillance on the African Blood Brotherhood. Eventually recognized as an ex-police officer, Jones was no longer an asset as a clandestine agent and he resigned from the Bureau on April 14, 1923.

Jones died on December 11, 1958, in Dormont, Pennsylvania.

On the February 10th, 2021, episode of The Daily Show with Trevor Noah, Roy Wood Jr. performed a comedy segment on James Wormley Jones accusing him of being a "black spy" who put Marcus Garvey in prison.

== See also ==
- Sylvia E. Mathis, first black woman special agent at the Federal Bureau of Investigation
