= Maxwell K. Goldstein =

American scientist (1908–1980)

- Born: January 15, 1908
- Died: February 18, 1980 (aged 72)
- Citizenship: United States
- Education: Johns Hopkins University
- Occupations: Scientist, electrical engineer, inventor
- Organization: United States Navy
- Known for: Implementation of HF/DF anti-submarine technology during World War II
- Spouse: Sydelle Noble
- Children: Barbara, Mara
- Parent(s): Bessie and Louis Goldstein

Maxwell K. Goldstein (January 15, 1908 – February 18, 1980) was a first generation Jewish-American scientist and engineer who was instrumental in the development and deployment of high-frequency direction finding by the United States Navy during the Second World War. High-frequency direction finding (known as huff-duff or HF/DF) played a significant role in the Allies efforts to counter the threat of German U-boats (submarines) during the Battle of the Atlantic. This success helped ensure the continued flow of equipment and supplies from the United States to Britain and to European battlefields, which was a critical factor in the ultimate Allied victory. Following World War II, Goldstein founded Balco Research Laboratory, which specialized in high resistance capacitors used in numerous military, civilian, and NASA projects.

== Early years ==
Maxwell Goldstein was born on January 15, 1908, to Bessie and Louis Goldstein, Jewish immigrants from Warsaw. He grew up in Baltimore, MD, attending primary school at Clifton Park Junior High School and high school at Baltimore Polytechnic Institute. He received a Bachelor of Engineering degree from Johns Hopkins University in 1930, followed by his doctorate in electrical engineering in 1934. During his time at Johns Hopkins, he established a reputation as being particularly skilled with practical solutions to technical problems, particularly with regards to radio technologies. From 1935 to 1937, he worked for the Air Navigation Development Board at the U.S. Army Air Force base at Wright Field (later Wright-Patterson Air Force Base), and then spent two years working for the Navigation Development Board of the Department of Commerce's Civil Aeronautics Authority. In 1939, he joined the Naval Research Laboratory.

== World War II ==
When World War II began, Goldstein led the Naval Research Laboratory's Radio Direction Finder section. He also served as one of three members of the Navy Department's Direction Finder Board and was the naval representative on the National Defense Research Committee for Radio Direction Finders. After the United States entered the war after the attack on Pearl Harbor, Goldstein's team was tasked with finding a solution to the problem of installing HF/DF systems on navy ships.

=== The Battle of the Atlantic and the U-boat threat ===
By early 1942, German U-boats, operating in squadrons called "Wolfpacks," were sinking hundreds of thousands of tons of Allied shipping each month. These losses were a serious threat to the Allied ability to transport equipment and supplies from the U.S. to England and to European battlefields. Allied naval forces implemented a number of countermeasures, including the use of convoys, early radar sets, and decrypted radio intercepts (through the Ultra program), but despite these tactics and tools, the tonnage lost to enemy submarines remained high.

The Allies were aware of one potential opportunity that could be exploited if the technical means could be found. The U-boat wolfpacks were under the direct command of GrossAdmiral Karl Dönitz, the German naval commander in chief. A former submariner with service in World War I, Dönitz insisted on personally guiding the submarine war, requiring his submarine captains to report in to him directly, often multiple times per day. A High Frequency Direction Finding system could determine the point of origin of such transmissions; the high level of radio traffic between the U-boat commanders and Dönitz's headquarters would provide the Allies with ample opportunities to use HF/DF to detect the wolfpacks and determine their locations and bearings.

=== High frequency direction finding ===
High Frequency Direction Finding uses a radio receiver to determine the direction and strength of a radio wave sent by a transmitter. By triangulating the measurements of two or more such receivers, a HF/DF system can then determine the location of the transmitter. In naval applications, HF/DF enables a system of receivers (mounted on shore installations or on several ships, as in a convoy) to detect radio transmissions sent by potential threats (other ships, submarines or aircraft) and to determine their location and bearing. This information then allows the force deploying the receivers to take appropriate countermeasures.

Prior to World War II, both the British and the U.S. had installed shore-based Direction Finding (D/F) installations, and had begun the process of developing and deploying HF/DF systems. Although these shore-based systems were useful for detecting enemy vessels and aircraft operating close to shore, there was a clear need for a system that could be deployed on ships operating out on ocean.

The U.S. HF/DF effort was based on a system invented by Dr. Henri Busignies a French engineer at ITT who had escaped Nazi-occupied France in late 1940. After the United States entered the war in December 1941, the U.S. Navy accelerated development of shipboard HF/DF. By early 1942, U.S. engineers at the Naval Research Laboratory and ITT, building on Busignies' work, had developed a shipboard HF/DF system designated "DAQ".

=== Solving the HF/DF problem ===
Although the new DAQ HF/DF system worked well in shore-based testing and was theoretically sound, it did not function correctly when installed on ships, giving false positives and ambiguous location readings. Goldstein was tasked to devise a solution to this problem for both Navy and Coast Guard vessels.

Goldstein determined that the ship's own structure and electronic equipment was causing the interference, and devised a practical solution. First, to provide the clearest possible access to transmitted radio waves, the HF/DF receiver antenna was placed at the highest point of the ship's mast, receiving priority over even the radar apparatus. Secondly, Goldstein developed a detailed testing and calibration protocol through which every individual HF/DF system was carefully customized to account for the structure, layout and electronics of the specific ship into which it was being installed. This calibration procedure was carried out in port, by having a small craft circle around the HF/DF-equipped vessel while transmitting its bearings on the frequencies employed by German submarines, and matching the transmitted data against the DAQ HF/DF reading.

Goldstein's work enabled the U.S. Navy to begin widespread implementation of HF/DF. In June 1942, the navy began equipping half of all new-construction destroyers and destroyer-escorts with HF/DF systems.

This breakthrough paid immediate dividends: between July 1942 and May 1943 Allied direction finders managed to divert 105 (out of 174) North Atlantic convoys away from wolf-pack ambushes, and enabled another 23 partially to avoid such traps. The Allied use of a full suite of technical innovations (including direction finding, radar and Ultra signals decryption) to help anticipate, avoid, and strike back against the U-boat threat decisively turned the tide of the Battle of the Atlantic. In November 1943, stating, "The enemy holds every trump card... knows all our secrets and we know none of his" Admiral Donitz permanently abandoned wolf-pack tactics, leaving individual U-boats to operate on their own. This shift in tactics relegated U-boats to little more than a harassment role, and signaled the end of German offensive operations in the Atlantic.

=== Recognition ===
On July 5, 1946, Secretary of the Navy James Forrestal presented Goldstein with the Navy Distinguished Civilian Service Award (the highest civilian honor the U.S. Navy can bestow upon a civilian employee), stating:

"For distinguished contributions to the Naval Service in developing high frequency direction finding as a vital weapon for combating the German submarine menace during the crucial Battle of the Atlantic. These contributions came about because of his persistent research and development which led to the NAvy's first successful shipboard high frequency direction finder."

Goldstein also received the Washington Academy of Science's 1949 award for Electrical Engineering for young scientists in recognition of his wartime work at the Naval Research Laboratory.

== Subsequent work ==
Following his work on HF/DF, in 1944 Goldstein was made head of the Navigation Section. He joined the Naval Science Division of the Office of Naval Research (ONR) early in 1948, taking a leave of absence in 1949 to become the senior technical staff member on the Air Navigation Development. In 1951 he co-founded Balco Research Laboratories in Newark, New Jersey, which specialized in high resistance, military grade capacitors. Balco became the sole supplier to the North Atlantic Treaty Organization (NATO) in 1962 and also supplied capacitors for the U.S. Navy's Polaris nuclear missile program.

== Marriage and family life ==
Goldstein married Sydelle Noble in New York City on January 22, 1939. They had two daughters, Barbara and Mara. He died at the age of 72, on February 18, 1980, and is buried with his wife.

== Patents ==
- US2544669 A—Direction Finder
- US2575340 A—Determination of Ground Constants
- US2452564 A—Direction Finder
- US2654085 A—Detector System
- US2485585 A—Direction Finder
- US2595263 A—Apparatus for measuring the phase shift between the input and output voltages of a circuit under test
- US2449553 A—Radio Compass
- US2305614 A—Phase Meter
- US2405203 A—Phase type direct indication direction finder
