= Ludomila Alexandrowna Scheiwiler-von Schreyder =

Swiss women's rights activist

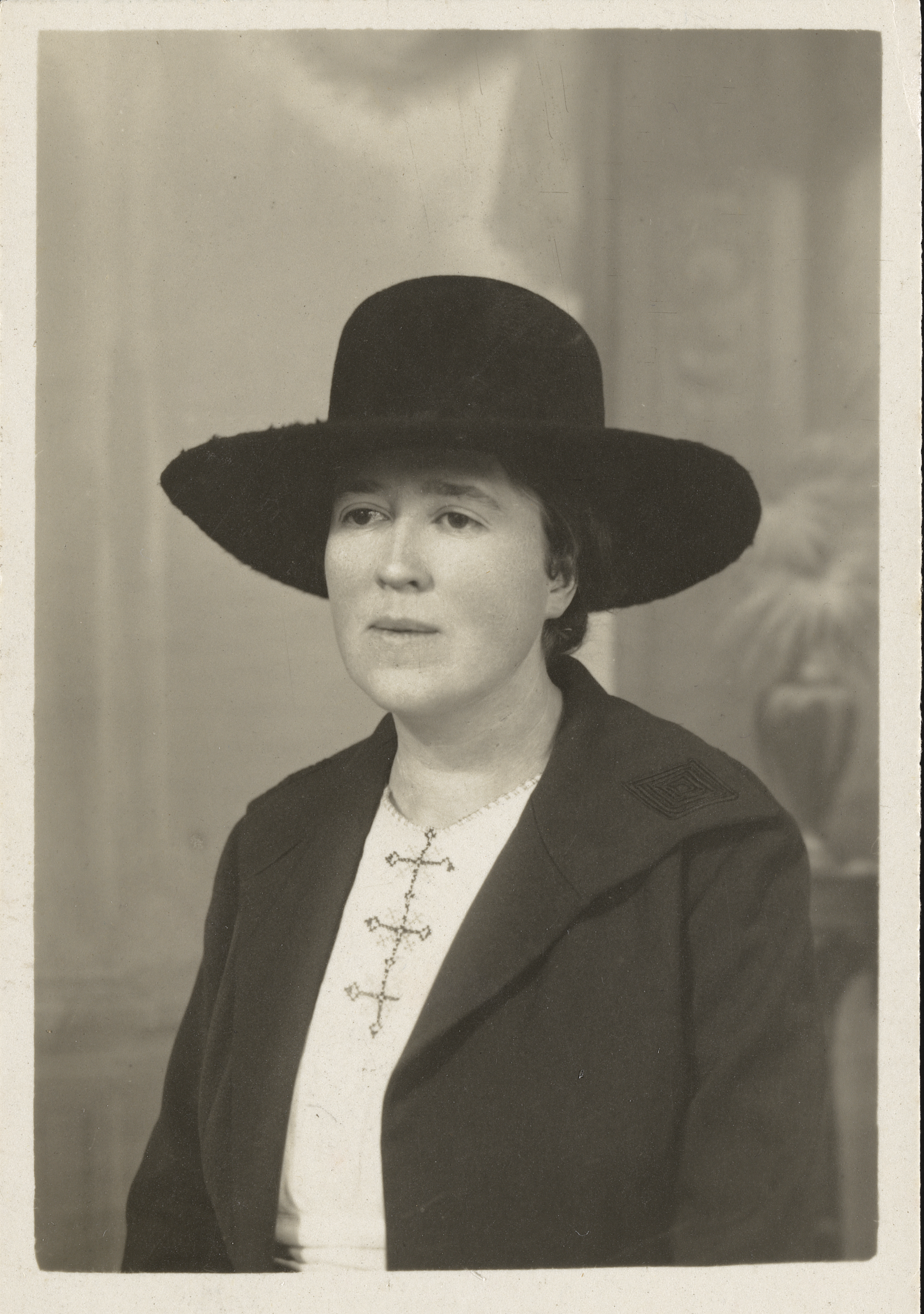
- Born: Ludomila Alexandrowna von Schreyder; April 10, 1888; Tbilisi, Russian Empire (now Georgia)
- Died: February 3, 1980 (aged 91); Frauenfeld, Switzerland
- Citizenship: Zürich (1913), Waldkirch (1925)
- Education: Gymnasium in Vienna and Zürich; Theology studies in Zürich and Berlin; Social-charitable school for women in Lucerne (diploma 1926)
- Occupation: Women's rights activist
- Known for: Founding and leading the Thurgau Association for Women's Suffrage
- Spouse: Albert Scheiwiler (m. 1925)
- Parent(s): Alexander von Schreyder; Bertha Broscis

Ludomila Alexandrowna Scheiwiler-von Schreyder (10 April 1888 – 3 February 1980) was a Swiss women's rights activist who founded and led the Thurgau Association for Women's Suffrage (thurgauer Frauenstimmrechtsvereinigung).

== Early life and education ==
Scheiwiler-von Schreyder was born on 10 April 1888 in Tbilisi, in the Russian Empire (now Georgia), into a German family. She was the daughter of Alexander von Schreyder, a station master, and Bertha Broscis. She later acquired Swiss citizenship, becoming a citizen of Zürich in 1913 and of Waldkirch in 1925.

She attended gymnasium primarily in Vienna and Zürich, and pursued interrupted studies in theology at Zürich and Berlin. From 1924 to 1926, she studied at the social-charitable school for women in Lucerne, receiving her diploma in 1926.

== Marriage and career ==
In 1925, she married Albert Scheiwiler, a Doctor of Letters and gymnasium teacher.

In 1926, Scheiwiler-von Schreyder launched the Thurgau Association for Women's Suffrage (thurgauer Frauenstimmrechtsvereinigung), which she presided over from 1943 to 1966. Possessing remarkable abilities in public speaking and music, she delivered numerous lectures on the position of women in politics and society. From 1940 to 1952, she served in the women's auxiliary service of the Swiss Armed Forces.
