= Lawrie Hodgson =

English footballer

Personal information
- Full name: Lawrence Hodgson
- Date of birth: 19 January 1917
- Place of birth: Birkenhead, England
- Date of death: 18 February 1980 (aged 63)
- Place of death: Birkenhead, England
- Position: Full back

Senior career*
Years	Team	Apps	(Gls)
1939–1951	Tranmere Rovers	78	(0)
- * Club domestic league appearances and goals

Lawrie Hodgson (19 January 1917 – 18 February 1980) was an English footballer, who played as a full back in the Football League for Tranmere Rovers.
