= Mow Mitchell =

American rugby union player (b. 1886)

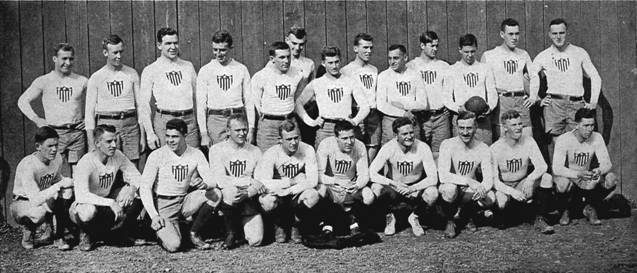
- Mitchell with the US team in 1913 (pictured front row, third from right)
- Full name: Mowatt Merrill Mitchell
- Born: September 18, 1886 San Francisco, California
- Died: February 18, 1980 (aged 93) Santa Clara, California
- School: Los Angeles High School
- University: Stanford University
- Notable relative: Ruth Comfort Mitchell Young (sister)

Rugby union career
- Position: Fly-half
Amateur team(s)
Years	Team	Apps	(Points)
1907–1910, 1913	Stanford University		
1913–1914	Los Angeles Athletic Club		
1915	Southern California All-Stars		
- Correct as of December 13, 2018
International career
Years	Team	Apps	(Points)
1913	United States	1	(0)
- Correct as of December 13, 2018

Mowatt Merrill "Mow" Mitchell (September 18, 1886 – February 18, 1980) was an American rugby union player and official who played at fly-half for the United States men's national team in its first capped match against New Zealand in 1913. He was also the first recipient of the California Mr. Basketball award, winning in 1905 and 1906.

== Biography ==
Mow Mitchell was born on September 18, 1886, in San Francisco, California, the second child and eldest son of John Samuel Mitchell and Florence Standish Mitchell (born Mowatt). Mitchell attended Los Angeles High School where he played basketball and baseball.

Mitchell began attending Stanford University in 1907. In that year, Mitchell served as captain of the school's freshman baseball team and played first base. Later in 1907, Mitchell joined the Stanford rugby team for a season that would be highlighted by a 21–11 victory over the University of California in the Big Game. Mitchell began serving as captain of the Stanford rugby team in the 1909 season. Mitchell graduated from Stanford with a degree in economics in May 1910.

By 1910, Mitchell had begun officiating rugby matches in Southern California. By 1914, his work as an official was well-regarded. Mitchell returned to Stanford for graduate studies and rejoined the university's rugby team in 1913. On November 15, 1913, Mitchell played for the United States at fly-half in its first test match against New Zealand—a 51–3 defeat. (Mitchell was injured during the match and replaced by a substitute.) In 1913 and 1914, Mitchell played rugby for the Los Angeles Athletic Club team. In 1915, alongside fellow Stanford and United States rugby player Louis Cass, Mitchell was a member of a Southern California All-Star rugby team that played a series of matches against university and Northern California All-Star opposition in October and November of that year. Mitchell was a strong proponent of Stanford University continuing to play rugby instead of American football; in spite of this, the University would ultimately revert to football.

On June 5, 1917, Mitchell enlisted with the United States Army. Mitchell served with the American Expeditionary Forces during World War I. Later in life, Mitchell married Simone Debruyn, with whom he had two children. Mitchell's brother, Stan, was also a rugby player and Stanford University attendee. Mitchell's older sister, Ruth Comfort Mitchell, was an author, playwright, and poet. Mow Mitchell died on February 18, 1980, in Santa Clara, California, at the age of 93.
