= William Stoney =

British swimmer

Personal information
- Born: 5 May 1898 Pateley Bridge, England
- Died: 16 February 1980 (aged 81) Huddersfield, England

Sport
- Sport: Swimming

William Stoney (9 May 1898 – 16 February 1980) was a British swimmer. He competed in the men's 200 metre breaststroke event at both the 1920 Summer Olympics and the 1924 Summer Olympics.
