= Roy Fosdahl =

Norwegian footballer (1911-1980)

Personal information
- Date of birth: 20 April 1911
- Place of birth: Fredrikshald, Norway
- Date of death: 5 February 1980 (aged 68)
- Position: Goalkeeper

International career
| Years | Team | Apps | (Gls) |
| 1930–1934 | Norway | 2 | (0) |

Roy Fosdahl (20 April 1911 – 5 February 1980) was a Norwegian footballer. He played in two matches for the Norway national football team from 1930 to 1934.
