= Karl Jestrab =

Austrian footballer (1907–1980)

Personal information
- Date of birth: 12 January 1907
- Date of death: 14 February 1980 (aged 73)
- Position: Defender

Senior career*
Years	Team	Apps	(Gls)
1925–1931	Wacker Wien		
1931	Servette		
1932–1937	Rapid Wien		
1937–1950	KSV Straßenbahn Wien		
1950–1951	SV Wienerberg		
1951–1952	Wacker Wien		

International career
1935	Austria	1	(0)
- * Club domestic league appearances and goals

Karl Jestrab (12 January 1907 – 14 February 1980) was an Austrian footballer who played as a defender. He made one appearance for the Austria national team in 1935.
