= Eric O. Anderson =

American politician

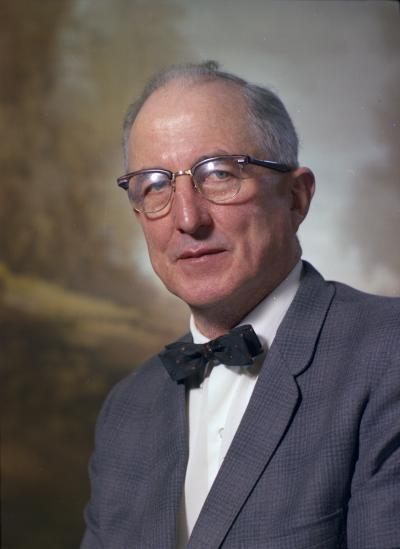
- Anderson in 1967

Member of the Washington House of Representatives for the 19th district
- In office 1967–1975

Member of the Washington House of Representatives for the 21st district
- In office 1961–1967

Personal details
- Born: September 26, 1905 New Zealand
- Died: February 13, 1980 (aged 74) Hoquiam, Washington, United States
- Party: Democratic

Eric O. Anderson (September 26, 1905 – February 13, 1980) was an American politician in the state of Washington. He served in the Washington House of Representatives from 1961 to 1975.
