= Ron Jackson (footballer) =

English footballer

Personal information
- Date of birth: 15 October 1919
- Place of birth: Crook, County Durham, England
- Date of death: 28 February 1980 (aged 60)
- Place of death: Althorp, Northamptonshire, England
- Position: Full back

Senior career*
Years	Team	Apps	(Gls)
1945–1949	Wrexham	108	(0)
1949–1955	Leicester City	161	(0)
- Kettering
- * Club domestic league appearances and goals

Ronald Jackson (15 October 1919 – 28 February 1980) was an English professional footballer, who played as a full back. He made over 250 appearances in the English Football League, between spells at Wrexham and Leicester City.
