= Margaret Heavey =

Irish polyglot and classics scholar

Margaret Mary Heavey
- Born: Margaret Mary Heavey; 18 October 1907; Athenry, Ireland
- Died: 15 February 1980 (aged 71); Galway, Ireland
- Other name: Mairghréad Ní Éimhthigh

Margaret Mary Heavey (18 October 1907 – 15 February 1980) was a polyglot and classics scholar. She taught in the Classics department at University College Galway from 1931 to 1980, and worked primarily in Irish, translating from Greek and Latin along with writing original works.

She is now honoured and remembered through the Margaret Heavey Memorial Lecture, an annual event held at NUI Galway, featuring a lecture by a chosen speaker. The last speaker, Prof. Hans van Wees (Grote Professor of Ancient History, university College London) spoke on 'The rise of a slave-owning society in early Greece'.

Upon her death in 1980, she donated to NUI Galway to establish the Athenry Prizes. The prize value is €300 and is awarded to students who obtain excellent results in Classics.

== Early life and education ==
Born in Athenry, Ireland to Thomas Heavey, a saddler and Alice Kirwan, from the Dublin undertaker family, Heavey was the eldest of six. She had two sisters, Susan and Frances Theresa and three brothers, Thomas Joseph, John Patrick and Christopher. Heavey attended the new Presentation School which had opened on 2nd Jan 1908. She started in 1911 and finished in 1924, at age 16. She went straight into University College Galway to study classics for her degree, gaining her BA in 1927. She did a higher diploma in education and an MA in classics together in 1928. She was multilingual, speaking English, Irish, German, French, Italian, Hebrew, Latin and Greek. She also had considerable talent in mathematics. Heavey was awarded the National University of Ireland travelling student scholarship and spent two years travelling and studying, based in Munich.

== Career ==
Heavey graduated with a BA from UCG (University College Galway) in 1927 and earned a Higher Diploma in Education and an MA in Classics in 1928. Whilst in the same year she won the National University of Ireland Travelling Studentship in Classics, allowing her to spend the next 2 years studying in Munich.

Heavey was appointed to the Classics Department in University College Galway in 1931. She eventually became the Professor of Classics (lecturing on Latin through Irish) from 1958 to 1977 and Dean of Arts from 1970 to 1976. She looked after her mother until her death in 1970 at which point she gave a home to her niece Ann, Ann's husband and their three children. Despite retiring, Heavey continued to be a lecturer in the university until she felt ill. She died three days later on 15 February 1980. Heavey bequeathed a donation to University College Galway to establish the Athenry Prizes and there is an annual Margaret Heavey Memorial Lecture.

She was well respected for her work in translations from Greek and Latin into Irish, allowing Irish students the opportunity to study these texts in the language. Síle Ní Mhurchú looked at significant individuals who contributed in this area and made reference to Heavey under 'Other Translators and Editors'. D. E. W. Wormell (Prof. of Latin at Trinity College, Dublin) said this in testimonial upon the occasion of her promotion to Professor in 1958.

"The standard attained by her pupils was high, and they combined accuracy and freshness of approach in a way that suggested thorough preparation by a teacher who was ready to take pains over fundamentals while welcoming originality… her mastery of Greek and Latin shows her to be an exceptionally gifted linguist with a feeling for language and a sense of style." - D. E. W. Wormell (Prof. of Latin at Trinity College, Dublin)

== Bibliography ==
- An Irish-language commentary on book II of Caesar's Gallic War (1940)
- Bun-Chúrsa Ceapadóireachta Gréigise (1941) [trans. North and Hillard's Latin Prose Composition]
- Graiméar Gréigise, 2 vols (1942) [trans. Sonnenschein's Greek Grammar]
- Prós-cheapadóireacht Laidne / Bradley's Arnold (1947) (with Seán Seártan)
