= Princess Anne Road =

Road in North Carolina and Virginia

- Length: 37.6 mi (60.5 km)
- South end: NC 615 Knotts Island Road, at the Virginia–North Carolina state line
- Major junctions: SR 603 in Pungo; SR 149 in Virginia Beach; SR 165 in Princess Anne Courthouse; SR 225 in Virginia Beach; SR 190 in Virginia Beach; US 58 in Norfolk; US 13 in Norfolk, SR 166 in Norfolk; SR 194 in Norfolk; SR 168 in Norfolk; US 460 in Norfolk; SR 337 in Norfolk
- North end: Dead end south of the Weyanoke Bird and Wildlife Sanctuary, at the Norfolk Southern Lamberts Point Yard

Princess Anne Road is a major thoroughfare in the Hampton Roads area, connecting onto Knotts Island Road (NC 615) at the North Carolina–Virginia border, and ending in Downtown Norfolk, Virginia.

== History ==
Princess Anne Road was the spine road of Princess Anne County before its absorption into the city of Virginia Beach.
