= Costante Bonazza =

Polish-Italian footballer (1924-1980)

Personal information
- Date of birth: 6 March 1924
- Place of birth: Ceriano Laghetto, Italy
- Date of death: 28 February 1980 (aged 55)
- Place of death: Lubań Śląski, Poland
- Positions: Defender; midfielder

Youth career
- Ambrosiana

Senior career*
Years	Team	Apps	(Gls)
- unknown lower league Italian club
1945–?	CKS Zduny		
- KS Zryw Choszczno
- Gwardia Koszalin
- Barycz Milicz
1949–1951	Arkonia Szczecin	8	(0)
- Sparta Lubań Śląski
- * Club domestic league appearances and goals

Costante Bonazza (6 March 1924 – 28 February 1980) was a Polish-Italian footballer who played as a right or central defender or attacking midfielder. He is best known for being the first Italian professional football player to play in Poland.

Born in Ceriano Laghetto, Italy on 6 March 1924, he started playing in the youth squads of Ambrosiana, and later in the Italian minor leagues. He was severely impacted by World War II, as in July 1944 he was interned at the Auschwitz concentration camp and lost all the members of his family during the war. He was released in 1945, and decided to move to Poland. He later married a Polish woman named Eleonora, and acquired Polish citizenship. He worked also in 1949 as car fitter in garage of the Provincial Headquarters of the Milicja Obywatelska in Szczecin.

He played in Poland for ten years; he made his debut in the top flight with Arkonia Szczecin for whom he played 8 games. He ended his career in 1955, and lived in Lubań Śląski till his death on 28 February 1980.
