= 1987 in the United States =

- Decades: 1960s; 1970s; 1980s; 1990s; 2000s
- See also: History of the United States (1980–1991); Timeline of United States history (1970–1989); List of years in the United States

Events from the year 1987 in the United States.

== Incumbents ==
=== Federal government ===
- President: Ronald Reagan (R-California)
- Vice President: George H. W. Bush (R-Texas)
- Chief Justice: William Rehnquist (Virginia)
- Speaker of the House of Representatives:

Tip O'Neill (D-Massachusetts) (until January 3)
Jim Wright (D-Texas) (starting January 6)

- Senate Majority Leader:

Bob Dole (R-Kansas) (until January 3)
Robert Byrd (D-West Virginia) (starting January 3)

- Congress: 99th (until January 3), 100th (starting January 3)

==== State governments ====
Governors and lieutenant governors

=== Governors ===
- Governor of Alabama: George Wallace (Democratic) (until January 19), H. Guy Hunt (Republican) (starting January 19)
- Governor of Alaska: Steve Cowper (Democratic)
- Governor of Arizona: Bruce Babbitt (Democratic) (until January 5), Evan Mecham (Republican) (starting January 5)
- Governor of Arkansas: Bill Clinton (Democratic)
- Governor of California: George Deukmejian (Republican)
- Governor of Colorado: Richard Lamm (Democratic) (until January 13), Roy Romer (Democratic) (starting January 13)
- Governor of Connecticut: William A O'Neill (Democratic)
- Governor of Delaware: Michael Castle (Republican)
- Governor of Florida:
  - until January 3: Bob Graham (Democratic)
  - January 3 – 6: Wayne Mixson (Democratic)
  - starting January 6: Bob Martinez (Republican)
- Governor of Georgia: Joe Frank Harris (Democratic)
- Governor of Hawaii: John D. Waihee III (Democratic)
- Governor of Idaho: John V. Evans (Democratic) (until January 5), Cecil D. Andrus (Democratic) (starting January 5)
- Governor of Illinois: James R. Thompson (Republican)
- Governor of Indiana: Robert D. Orr (Republican)
- Governor of Iowa: Terry E. Branstad (Republican)
- Governor of Kansas: John W. Carlin (Democratic) (until January 12), Mike Hayden (Republican) (starting January 12)
- Governor of Kentucky: Martha Layne Collins (Democratic) (until December 8), Wallace G. Wilkinson (Democratic) (starting December 8)
- Governor of Louisiana: Edwin W. Edwards (Democratic)
- Governor of Maine: Joseph E. Brennan (Democratic) (until January 7), John R. McKernan Jr. (Republican) (starting January 7)
- Governor of Maryland: Harry R. Hughes (Democratic) (until January 20), William Donald Schaefer (Democratic) (starting January 20)
- Governor of Massachusetts: Michael Dukakis (Democratic)
- Governor of Michigan: James Blanchard (Democratic)
- Governor of Minnesota: Rudy Perpich (Democratic)
- Governor of Mississippi: William Allain (Democratic)
- Governor of Missouri: John Ashcroft (Republican)
- Governor of Montana: Ted Schwinden (Democratic)
- Governor of Nebraska: Bob Kerrey (Democratic) (until January 9), Kay A. Orr (Republican) (starting January 9)
- Governor of Nevada: Richard Bryan (Democratic)
- Governor of New Hampshire: John H. Sununu (Republican)
- Governor of New Jersey: Thomas Kean (Republican)
- Governor of New Mexico: Toney Anaya (Democratic) (until January 1), Garrey Carruthers (Republican) (starting January 1)
- Governor of New York: Mario Cuomo (Democratic)
- Governor of North Carolina: James G. Martin (Republican)
- Governor of North Dakota: George A. Sinner (Democratic)
- Governor of Ohio: Dick Celeste (Democratic)
- Governor of Oklahoma: George Nigh (Democratic) (until January 12), Henry Bellmon (Republican) (starting January 12)
- Governor of Oregon: Victor G. Atiyeh (Republican) (until January 12), Neil Goldschmidt (Democratic) (starting January 12)
- Governor of Pennsylvania: Dick Thornburgh (Republican) (until January 20), Robert P. Casey (Democratic) (starting January 20)
- Governor of Rhode Island: Edward D. DiPrete (Republican)
- Governor of South Carolina: Richard Riley (Democratic) (until January 14), Carroll A. Campbell Jr. (Republican) (starting January 14)
- Governor of South Dakota: William J. Janklow (Republican) (until January 6), George S. Mickelson (Republican) (starting January 6)
- Governor of Tennessee: Lamar Alexander (Republican) (until January 17), Ned McWherter (Democratic) (starting January 17)
- Governor of Texas: Mark White (Democratic) (until January 20), Bill Clements (Republican) (starting January 20)
- Governor of Utah: Norman H. Bangerter (Republican)
- Governor of Vermont: Madeleine M. Kunin (Democratic)
- Governor of Virginia: Gerald L. Baliles (Democratic)
- Governor of Washington: Booth Gardner (Democratic)
- Governor of West Virginia: Arch A. Moore Jr. (Republican)
- Governor of Wisconsin: Tony Earl (Democratic) (until January 5), Tommy Thompson (Republican) (starting January 5)
- Governor of Wyoming: Edgar J. Herschler (Democratic) (until January 7), Mike Sullivan (Democratic) (starting January 7)

=== Lieutenant governors ===
- Lieutenant Governor of Alabama: Bill Baxley (Democratic) (until January 19), Jim Folsom Jr. (Democratic) (starting January 19)
- Lieutenant Governor of Alaska: Stephen McAlpine (Democratic)
- Lieutenant Governor of Arkansas: Winston Bryant (Democratic)
- Lieutenant Governor of California: Leo T. McCarthy (Democratic)
- Lieutenant Governor of Colorado: Nancy Dick (Democratic) (until January 13), Mike Callihan (Democratic) (starting January 13)
- Lieutenant Governor of Connecticut: Joseph J. Fauliso (Democratic)
- Lieutenant Governor of Delaware: Shien Biau Woo (Democratic)
- Lieutenant Governor of Florida:
  - until January 3: Wayne Mixson (Democratic)
  - January 3-6: vacant
  - starting January 6: Bobby Brantley (Republican)
- Lieutenant Governor of Georgia: Zell Miller (Democratic)
- Lieutenant Governor of Hawaii: Ben Cayetano (Democratic)
- Lieutenant Governor of Idaho: David H. Leroy (Republican) (until January 5), Butch Otter (Republican) (starting January 5)
- Lieutenant Governor of Illinois: George H. Ryan (Republican)
- Lieutenant Governor of Indiana: John Mutz (Republican)
- Lieutenant Governor of Iowa: Robert T. Anderson (Democratic) (until January), Jo Ann Zimmerman (Democratic) (starting January)
- Lieutenant Governor of Kansas: Thomas R. Docking (Democratic) (until January 12), Jack D. Walker (Republican) (starting January 12)
- Lieutenant Governor of Kentucky: Steve Beshear (Democratic) (until December 8), Brereton Jones (Democratic) (starting December 8)
- Lieutenant Governor of Louisiana: Robert "Bobby" Freeman (Democratic)
- Lieutenant Governor of Maryland: J. Joseph Curran (Democratic) (until January 21), Melvin A. Steinberg (Democratic) (starting January 21)
- Lieutenant Governor of Massachusetts: vacant (until month and day unknown), Evelyn Murphy (Democratic) (starting month and day unknown)
- Lieutenant Governor of Michigan: Martha W. Griffiths (Democratic)
- Lieutenant Governor of Minnesota: Marlene Johnson (Democratic)
- Lieutenant Governor of Mississippi: Brad Dye (Democratic)
- Lieutenant Governor of Missouri: Harriett Woods (Democratic)
- Lieutenant Governor of Montana: George Turman (Democratic)
- Lieutenant Governor of Nebraska: Donald F. McGinley (Democratic) (until January 9), William E. Nichol (Republican) (starting January 9)
- Lieutenant Governor of Nevada: Bob Cashell (Democratic) (until January 5), Bob Miller (Democratic) (starting January 5)
- Lieutenant Governor of New Mexico: Mike Runnels (Democratic) (until January 1), Jack L. Stahl (Republican) (starting January 1)
- Lieutenant Governor of New York: Stan Lundine (Democratic) (starting January 1)
- Lieutenant Governor of North Carolina: Robert B. Jordan, III (Democratic)
- Lieutenant Governor of North Dakota: Ruth Meiers (Democratic) (until March 19), Lloyd Omdahl (Democratic) (starting March 19)
- Lieutenant Governor of Ohio: vacant (until January 12), Paul R. Leonard (Democratic) (starting January 12)
- Lieutenant Governor of Oklahoma: Spencer Bernard (Democratic) (until January 12), Robert S. Kerr III (Democratic) (starting January 12)
- Lieutenant Governor of Pennsylvania: William Scranton, III (Republican) (until January 20), Mark Singel (Democratic) (starting January 20)
- Lieutenant Governor of Rhode Island: Richard A. Licht (Democratic)
- Lieutenant Governor of South Carolina: Michael R. Daniel (Democratic) (until January 14), Nick Theodore (Democratic) (starting January 14)
- Lieutenant Governor of South Dakota: Lowell C. Hansen II (Republican) (until January 6), Walter Dale Miller (Republican) (starting January 6)
- Lieutenant Governor of Tennessee: John S. Wilder (Democratic)
- Lieutenant Governor of Texas: William P. Hobby Jr. (Democratic)
- Lieutenant Governor of Utah: W. Val Oveson (Republican)
- Lieutenant Governor of Vermont: Peter Plympton Smith (Republican) (until month and day unknown), Howard Dean (Democratic) (starting month and day unknown)
- Lieutenant Governor of Virginia: Douglas Wilder (Democratic)
- Lieutenant Governor of Washington: John Cherberg (Democratic)
- Lieutenant Governor of Wisconsin: James Flynn (Democratic) (until January 5), Scott McCallum (Republican) (starting January 5)

== Events ==
=== January ===
- January 5 – President Ronald Reagan undergoes prostate surgery, causing speculation about his physical fitness to continue in office.
- January 13 – New York mafiosi Anthony "Fat Tony" Salerno and Carmine Peruccia are sentenced to 100 years in prison for racketeering.
- January 22 – Pennsylvania State Treasurer R. Budd Dwyer commits suicide by shooting himself during a press conference. The incident was captured by news cameras and later broadcast on television.
- January 27 – State of the Union Address.
- January 28 – The U.S. State Department invalidates US passports for travel to or through Lebanon due to security concerns. The ban was lifted in 1997.
- January 29 – William J. Casey ends his term as Director of the Central Intelligence Agency.
- January 31 – The last Ohrbach's department store closes in New York City after 64 years of operation.

=== February ===
- February 9 – Brownsville, Texas, receives 7 inches (177.80 mm) of rain in just two hours; flooding in some parts of the city is worse than that caused by Hurricane Beulah in 1967.
- February 11 – The United States military detonates an atomic weapon at the Nevada Test Site.
- February 20 – A second Unabomber bomb explodes at a computer store in Salt Lake City, injuring the owner.
- February 26 – Iran–Contra affair: The Tower Commission rebukes U.S. President Ronald Reagan for not controlling his National Security Council staff.

=== March ===
- March 2 – American Motors Corporation is acquired by the Chrysler Corporation.
- March 3 – Ruthless Records was founded by Eazy-E & Jerry Heller.
- March 4
  - U.S. President Ronald Reagan addresses the American people on the Iran–Contra affair, acknowledging that his overtures to Iran had 'deteriorated' into an arms-for-hostages deal.
  - Jonathan Pollard is sentenced to life in prison on one count of espionage.
- March 11 – The Watsonville Cannery strike comes to an official end with companies agreeing to union protection of wage cuts, among other benefits.
- March 12 – AIDS Coalition to Unleash Power, abbreviated to ACT UP, is formed at the Lesbian, Gay, Bisexual & Transgender Community Center in New York City.
- March 18 – Woodstock of physics: The marathon session of the American Physical Society’s meeting features 51 presentations concerning the science of high-temperature superconductors.
- March 19 – In Charlotte, North Carolina, televangelist Jim Bakker, head of PTL Ministries, resigns after admitting an affair with church secretary Jessica Hahn.
- March 29 – The World Wrestling Federation presents WrestleMania III at the Pontiac Silverdome in Pontiac, Michigan. Hulk Hogan retains the WWF World Heavyweight Championship defeating his former friend André The Giant.
- March 30 – The 59th Academy Awards, hosted by Chevy Chase, Goldie Hawn and Paul Hogan, are held at Dorothy Chandler Pavilion in Los Angeles. Oliver Stone's Platoon wins four awards out of eight nominations, including Best Picture and Best Director. The film is tied in nominations by James Ivory's A Room with a View.

=== April ===
- April 5 – The Fox Network makes its primetime debut.
- April 19 – The Simpsons cartoon first appears as a series of shorts on The Tracey Ullman Show.
- April 23 – L'Ambiance Plaza collapse: 28 construction workers are killed at a residential project under construction in Bridgeport, Connecticut. It was one of the worst disasters in Connecticut history.
- April 27 – The United States Department of Justice declares incumbent Austrian president Kurt Waldheim an "undesirable alien".
- April 30 – NASCAR driver Bill Elliott sets the record for the all-time fastest lap at Talladega Superspeedway at 212.8 miles per hour (342.5 km/h).

=== May ===
- May 8 – U.S. Senator Gary Hart drops out of the running for the 1988 Democratic presidential nomination, amid allegations of an extramarital affair with Donna Rice.
- May 17 – The USS Stark is hit by two Iraqi owned Exocet AM39 air-to-surface missiles, killing 37 sailors.
- May 21 – Andrew Wyeth, with his "Helga Pictures," becomes the first living American painter to have a one-man show of his work in the West Building of the National Gallery of Art in Washington, DC.
- May 24
  - Approximately 800,000 people gather for a walk to celebrate the 50th anniversary of the opening of the Golden Gate Bridge in San Francisco, California.
  - Five days before his 48th birthday, Al Unser became the oldest winner of the Indianapolis 500 and only the second driver to win the event four times.

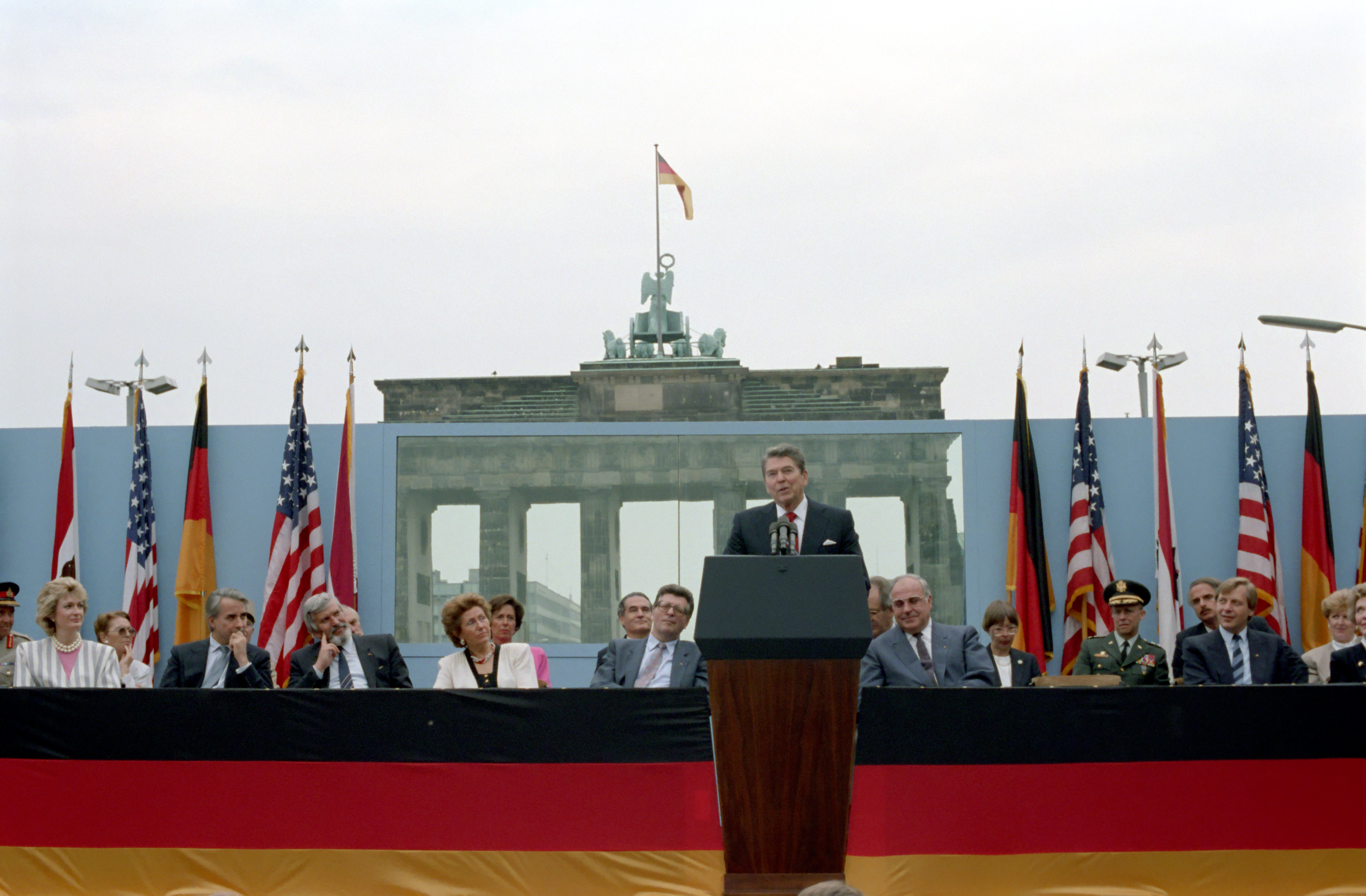
June 12: "Mr. Gorbachev, tear down this wall!"

=== June ===
- June 12 – During a visit to Berlin, Germany, U.S. President Ronald Reagan challenges Soviet General Secretary Mikhail Gorbachev to tear down the Berlin Wall.
- June 16 – Bernhard Goetz is exonerated on 12 of 13 counts by a jury in the case against him stemming from the 1984 shootings of four youths in a New York subway car.
- June 19
  - Teddy Seymour is officially designated the first black man to sail around the world, when he completes his solo sailing circumnavigation in Frederiksted, St. Croix, of the United States Virgin Islands.
  - Edwards v. Aguillard: The Supreme Court of the United States rules that a Louisiana law requiring that creation science be taught in public schools whenever evolution is taught is unconstitutional.
- June 28 – An accidental explosion at Hohenfels Training Area in West Germany kills 3 U.S. troopers.

=== July ===
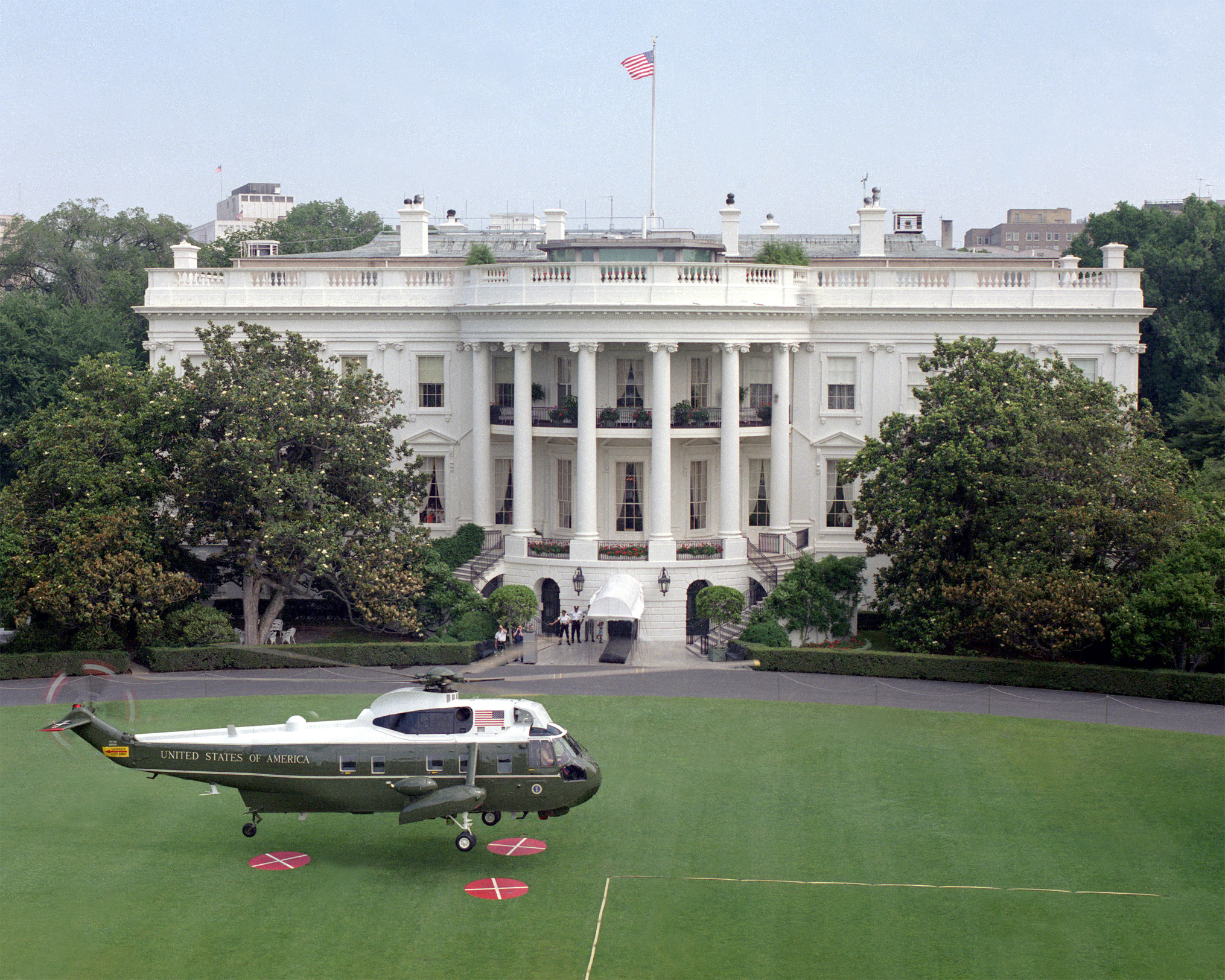
VH-3D landing on White House south lawn, July 1987

- July 1 – U.S. President Ronald Reagan nominates former Solicitor General Robert Bork to the Supreme Court. The nomination is later rejected by the Senate, the first and only nominee rejection to date.
- July 17 – The Dow Jones Industrial Average closes above the 2,500 mark for the first time, at 2,510.04.
- July 25 – United States Secretary of Commerce Malcolm Baldrige Jr. dies in a rodeo accident at a California ranch.

=== August ===
- August 7–23 – Pan American Games are held in Indianapolis.
- August 16 – Northwest Airlines Flight 255 (a McDonnell Douglas MD-82) crashes on takeoff from Detroit Metropolitan Airport in Romulus, Michigan just West of Detroit killing all but one (4-year old Cecelia Cichan) of the 156 people on board (among them Nick Vanos, a center for the Phoenix Suns).
- August 19 – ABC News chief Middle East correspondent Charles Glass escapes his Hezbollah kidnappers in Beirut, Lebanon, after 62 days in captivity.
- August 31 – Michael Jackson releases Bad, his first studio album since Thriller, the best-selling album of all time. The album would produce five number one singles in the US, a record which has not been broken.

=== September ===
- September 17 – Televangelist Pat Robertson announces his candidacy for the 1988 Republican presidential nomination.
- September 25 – Varroa destructor, an invasive parasite, is found for the first time in the U.S.

=== October ===
- October – The unemployment rate drops below 6% for the first time since 1979.
- October 1 – The 5.9 M_{w} Whittier Narrows earthquake affected the Los Angeles Area with a maximum Mercalli intensity of VIII (Severe), killing eight and injuring 200.
- October 10 – Reverend Jesse Jackson launches his second campaign for U.S. president.
- October 11 – The first National Coming Out Day is held in celebration of the second National March on Washington for Lesbian and Gay Rights.
- October 14–16 – A young child, Jessica McClure, falls down a well in Midland, Texas, and is later rescued.
- October 19
  - Black Monday: Stock market levels fall sharply on Wall Street and around the world.
  - Operation Earnest Will: U.S. warships destroy two Iranian oil platforms in the Persian Gulf
- October 23 – On a vote of 58–42, the United States Senate rejects President Ronald Reagan's nomination of Robert Bork to the Supreme Court.
- October 25 – 1987 World Series: The Minnesota Twins defeat the St. Louis Cardinals despite having the worst regular season win–loss ratio for a winner, a record they hold until 2006.
- October 26 – The Dow Jones Industrial Average goes down 156.83 points; at the time it is the second largest decrease ever (trailing Black Monday).

=== November ===
- November 6 – Florida rapist Tommy Lee Andrews is the first person to be convicted as a result of DNA fingerprinting: he is sentenced to 22 years in prison.
- November 13–23 – Atlanta prison riots: Cuban Inmates at the Atlanta Federal Penitentiary rioted over fears of Deportation back to Cuba, seizing hostages and setting fires, resulting in the death of one inmate and significant damage.
- November 18 – Iran–Contra affair: U.S. Senate and House panels release reports charging President Ronald Reagan with 'ultimate responsibility' for the affair.
- November 22 – The Max Headroom Incident: An unidentified person hijacks two television stations in Chicago, Illinois, and broadcasts video of them wearing a mask in the likeness of the character Max Headroom.
- November 23 – Frank Carlucci is sworn in as the new Secretary of Defense, succeeding Caspar Weinberger.

=== December ===
- December – The unemployment rate drops to 5.7%, the lowest since July 1979.
- December 1 – NASA announces the names of four companies who were awarded contracts to help build Space Station Freedom: Boeing Aerospace, General Electric's Astro-Space Division, McDonnell Douglas, and the Rocketdyne Division of Rockwell.
- December 2 – Hustler Magazine v. Falwell is argued before the U.S. Supreme Court.
- December 7 – Pacific Southwest Airlines Flight 1771 crashes near Paso Robles, California, killing all 43 on board, after a disgruntled passenger shoots his ex-supervisor on the flight, then shoots both pilots and himself.
- December 8 – The Intermediate-Range Nuclear Forces Treaty is signed in Washington, D.C. by U.S. President Ronald Reagan and Soviet leader Mikhail Gorbachev.
- December 10 – A squirrel closes down the Nasdaq Stock Exchange when it burrows through a telephone line.
- December 22–28 – Ronald Gene Simmons goes on a 6-day killing spree in Russellville, Arkansas, killing his wife, children, and grandchildren as they arrived to celebrate the holidays at his home. On the 28th he went on a shooting spree, killing an additional woman and wounding 5 others before surrendering to police. The final death toll was 16. He was tried and eventually executed.
- December 29 – Prozac makes its debut in the United States.

=== Date unknown ===
- The Silence=Death Project is launched in New York City by six gay rights activists, including Avram Finkelstein.
- Varroa destructor, an invasive parasite of honeybees, is found in the United States.

=== Ongoing ===
- Cold War (1947–1991)
- Iran–Contra affair (1985–1987)

== Births ==
=== January ===
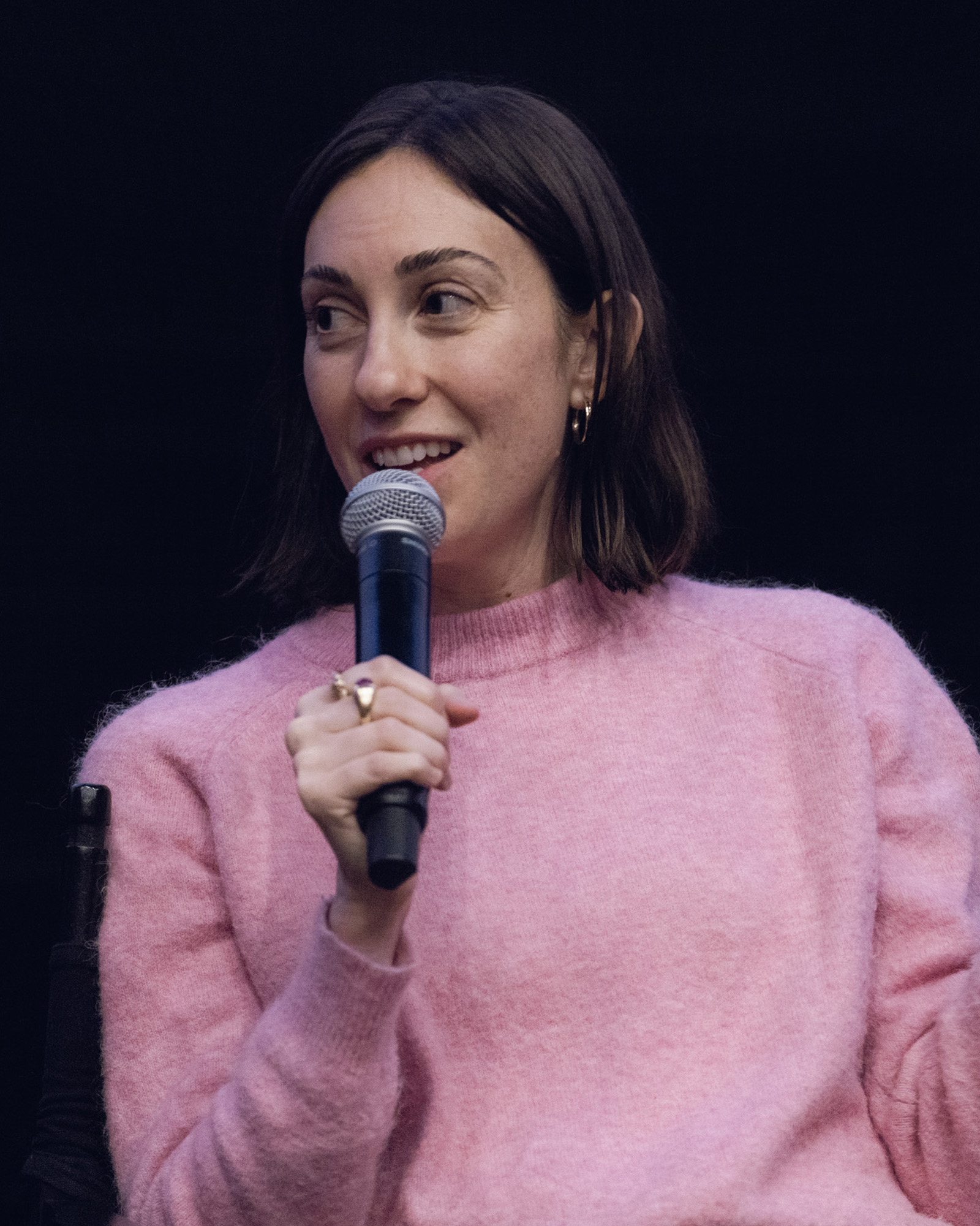
Gia Coppola

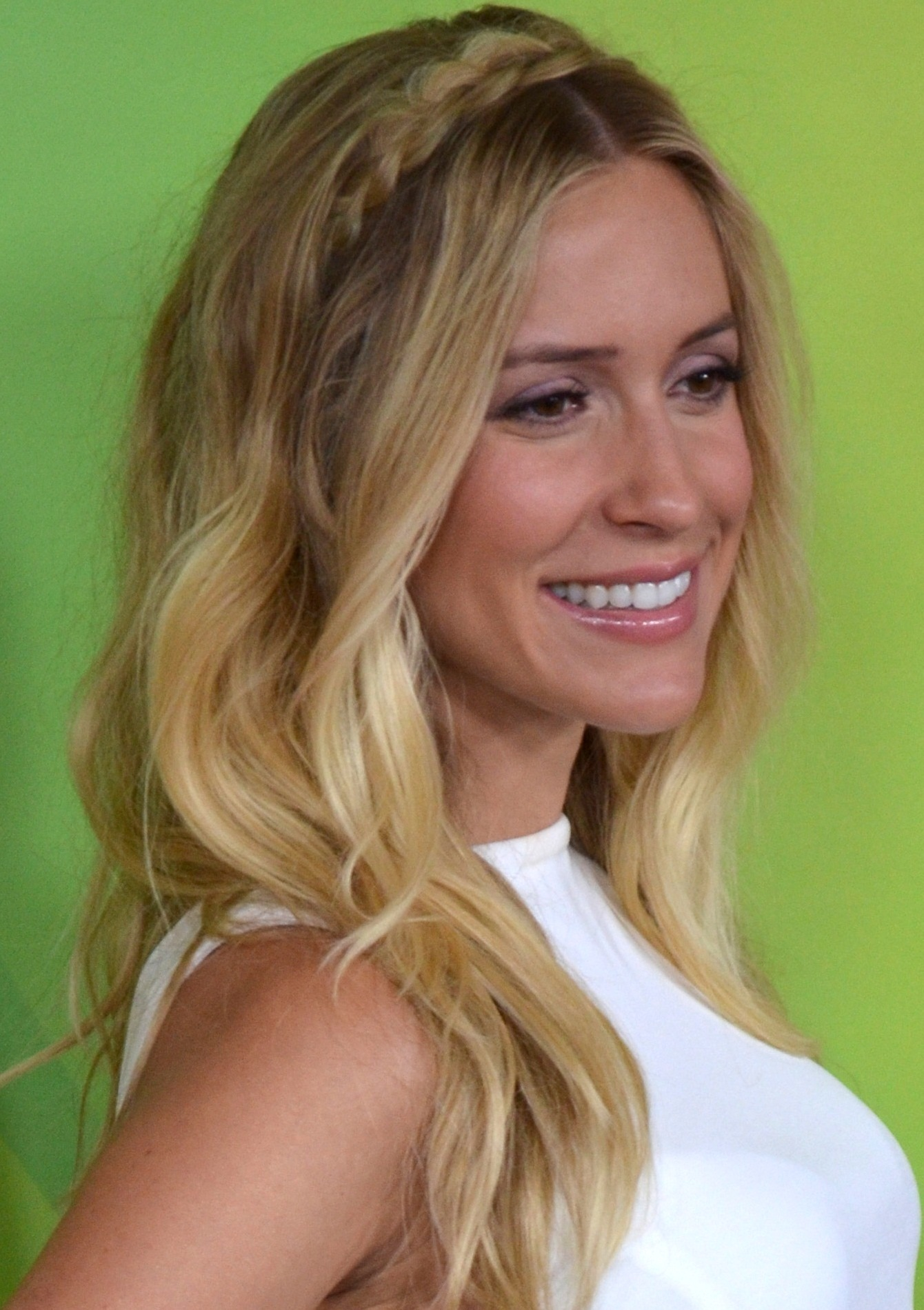
Kristin Cavallari

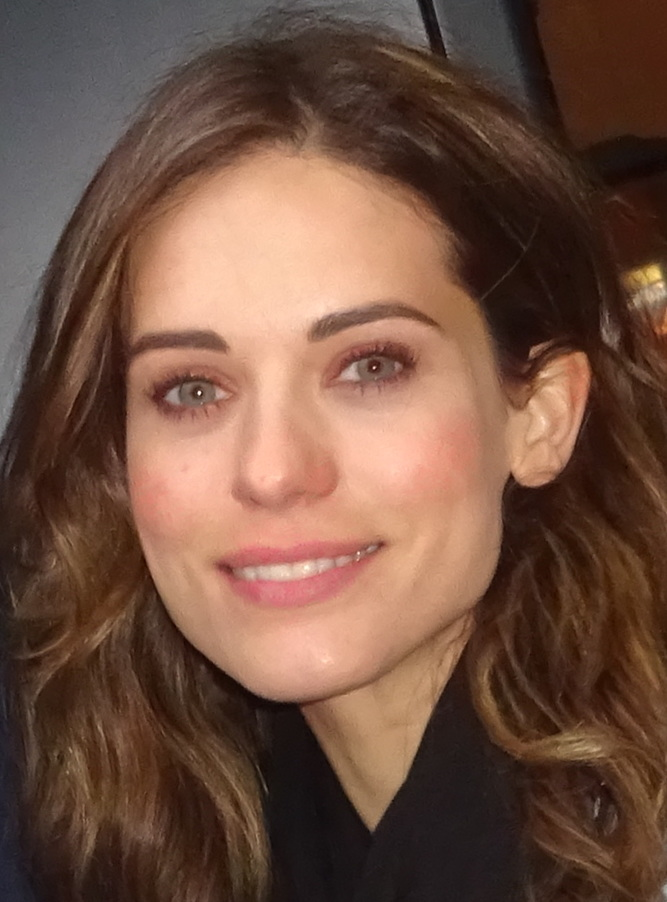
Lyndsy Fonseca

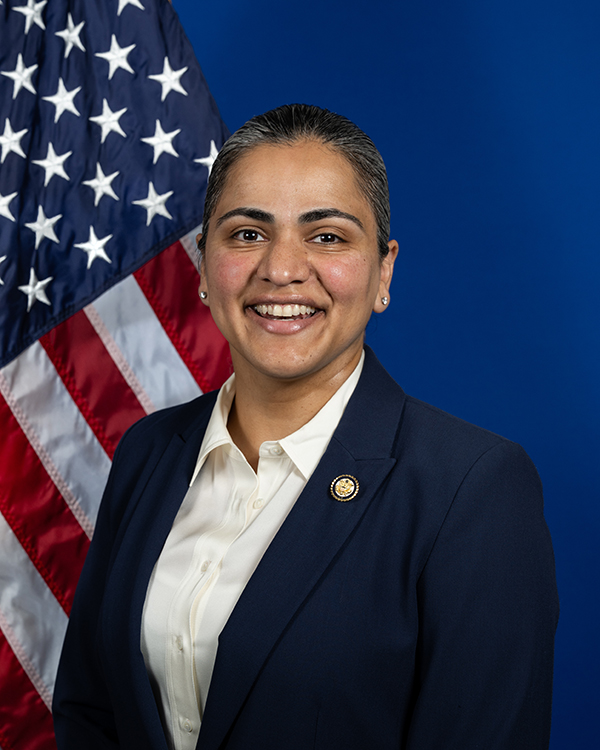
Aisha Wahab

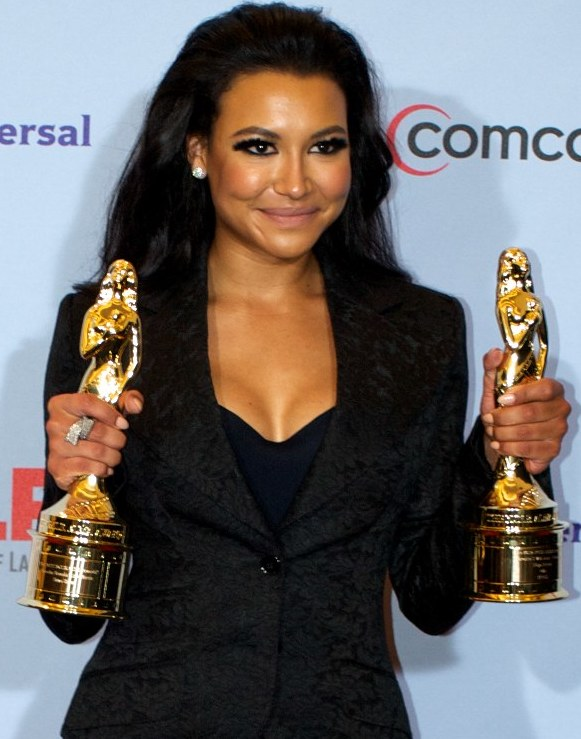
Naya Rivera

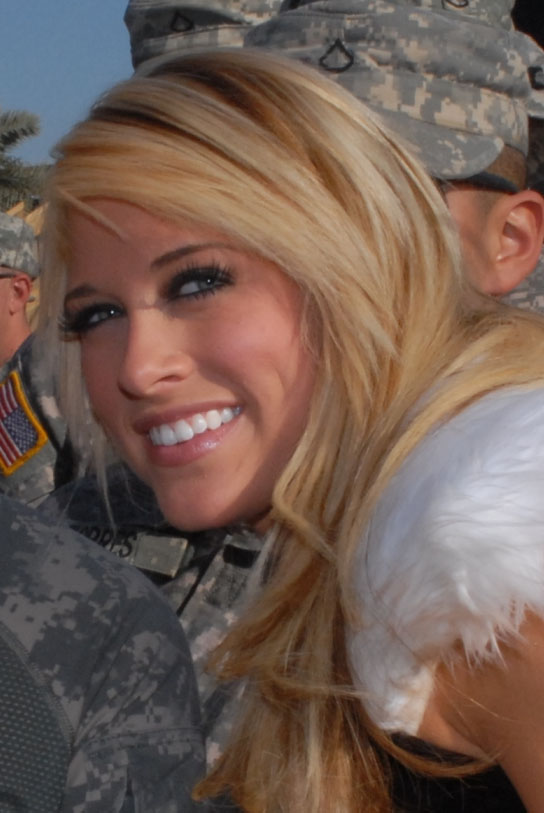
Kelly Kelly

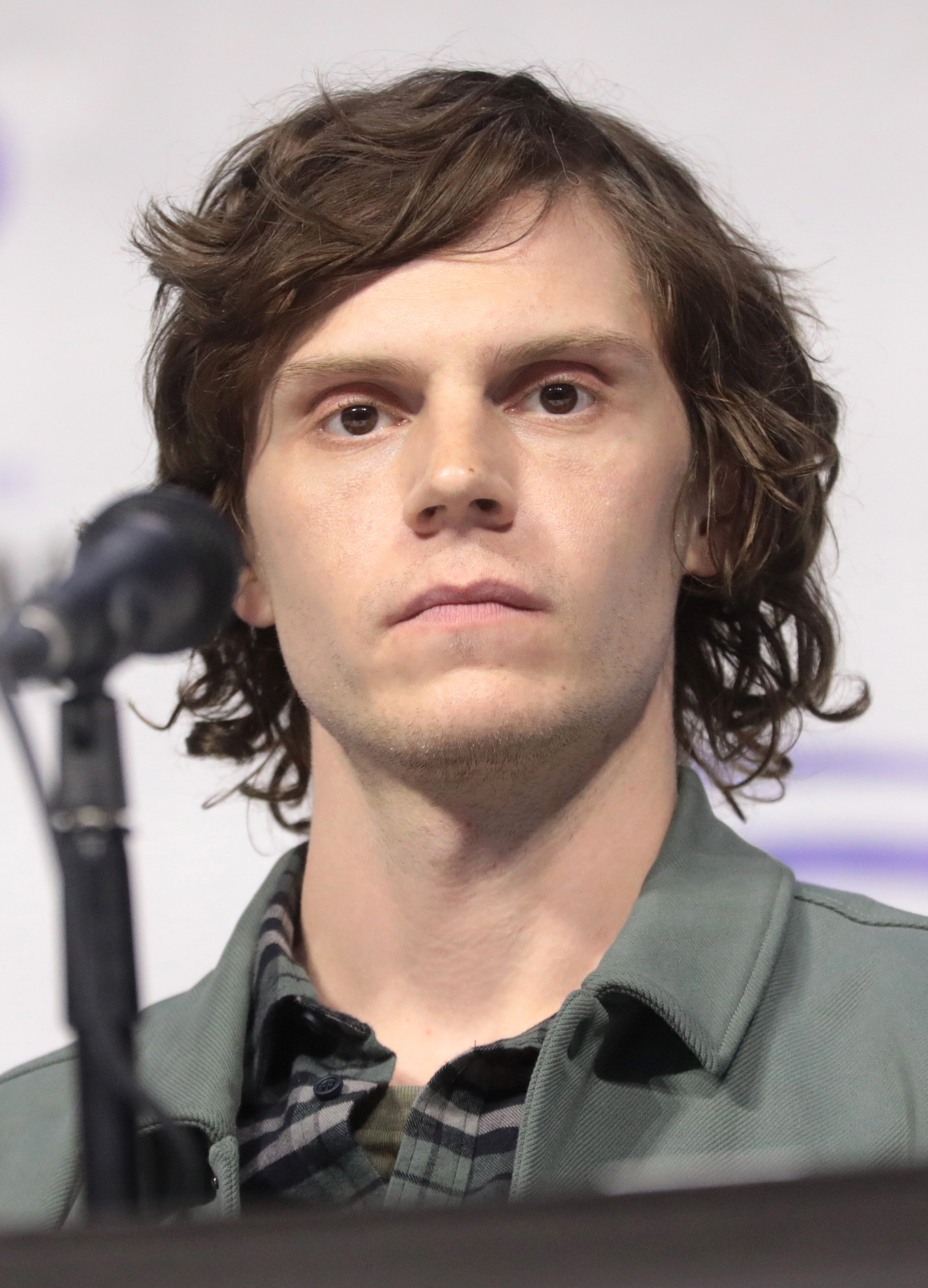
Evan Peters

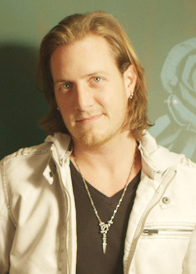
Tyler Hubbard

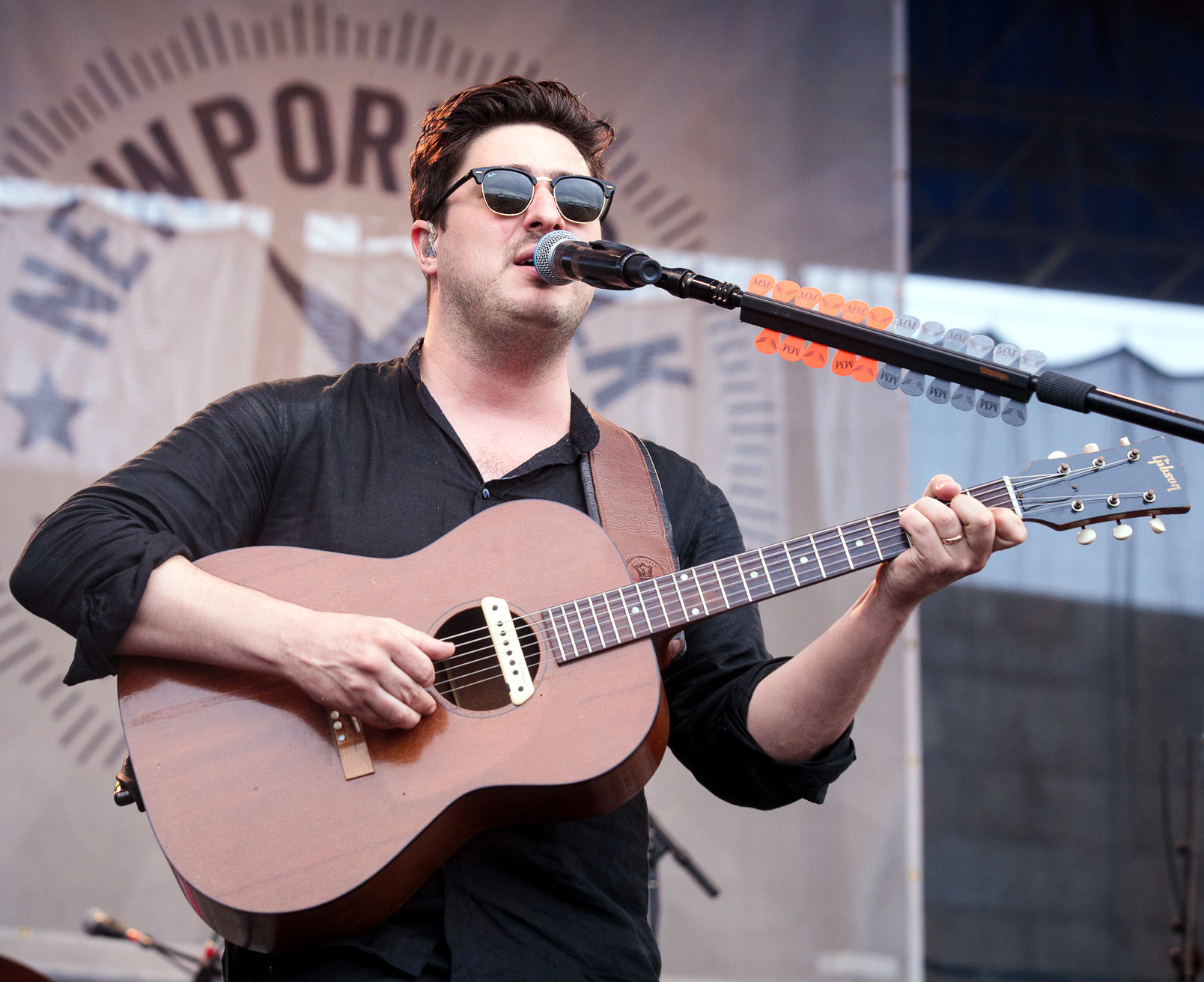
Marcus Mumford

- January 1
  - Will Brandenburg, Olympic alpine skier
  - Gia Coppola, film director, screenwriter, and actress
  - Meryl Davis, Olympic figure skater
  - Ryan Perrilloux, football player
- January 2
  - Shelley Hennig, actress and model
  - Syesha Mercado, singer
  - Lauren Storm, actress and acting coach
- January 5
  - Dexter Bean, stock car racing driver
  - Kristin Cavallari, actress
  - Willie Mack, wrestler
  - Jason Mitchell, actor
- January 6
  - Arin Hanson, internet personality, comedian, voice actor, songwriter, rapper, animator and cartoonist
  - Ndamukong Suh, football player
- January 7
  - Brandon Bantz, baseball player
  - Michael Callahan, soccer player
  - Melanie Cruise, wrestler
  - Alisha Edwards, wrestler
  - Lyndsy Fonseca, actress
- January 10 – Perrish Cox, football player
- January 11
  - Scotty Cranmer, BMX rider
  - Briann January, basketball player
  - Aisha Wahab, politician
- January 12
  - Deena Nicole Cortese, television personality
  - Naya Rivera, actress and singer (d. 2020)
  - Will Rothhaar, actor
- January 13
  - Parker Croft, actor and screenwriter
  - Jack Johnson, ice hockey player
  - Max Van Ville, DJ, producer, and actor
  - Oliver Drake, baseball pitcher player
- January 14 – James Belfer, producer, founder and CEO of Cartuna, founder and CEO of Dogfish Pictures, and founder and managing director of Dogfish Accelerator
- January 15
  - Daniel Caluag, BMX racer
  - Kelly Kelly, model and wrestler
- January 16
  - Callahan Bright, football player
  - Kurt Travis, singer/songwriter
- January 17
  - Jeff Beliveau, baseball player
  - John Cochran, television writer and personality
  - Tony Crocker, basketball player
- January 18
  - Jackie Acevedo, American-born Mexican footballer
  - Nolan Carroll, football player
- January 19
  - Jordan Brauninger, figure skater
  - Shaun Brown, actor
  - Brian Harman, golfer
- January 20
  - Diana Barrera, American-born Guatemalan footballer
  - Peter Broderick, musician and composer
  - Evan Peters, actor
  - Pete Ploszek, actor
- January 21 – Brandon Crawford, baseball player
- January 22
  - Timroy Allen, Jamaican-born cricketer
  - Ray Rice, football player
- January 23
  - Whitney Boddie, basketball player
  - Jarrett Brown, football player
- January 24
  - Marlon Amprey, politician
  - Travis Beckum, football player
  - Brian Cushing, football player
- January 25 – Isaako Aaitui, football player
- January 26
  - Patrick Cullity, ice hockey player
  - Andrew J. Ferchland, actor
- January 27
  - Rucka Rucka Ali, rapper, singer, comedian, and YouTuber
  - Ashley Avis, screenwriter, director, and producer
  - Marcus Brown, football player
  - Anthony Pettis, mixed martial artist
  - Katy Rose, singer/songwriter
  - Hannah Teter, Olympic snowboarder
  - Kristi Toliver, basketball player and coach
- January 28
  - Alexandria Anderson, track and field sprinter
  - David Bowen, politician
  - Chelsea Brummet, actress and singer
  - Katie Nolan, sports personality and TV host
- January 29
  - Alex Avila, baseball player
  - Jessica Burkhart, author
  - Spencer Clark, stock car racing driver (d. 2006)
  - Alex Murrel, singer and actress
- January 30 – Phil Lester, YouTube personality
- January 31
  - Pat Angerer, football player
  - Kurt Baker, musician, songwriter, music producer, and multi-instrumentalist
  - Brandon Bollig, ice hockey player
  - Tyler Hubbard, country singer and one half of Florida Georgia Line
  - Marcus Mumford, English-born singer/songwriter, musician, and frontman for Mumford & Sons

=== February ===
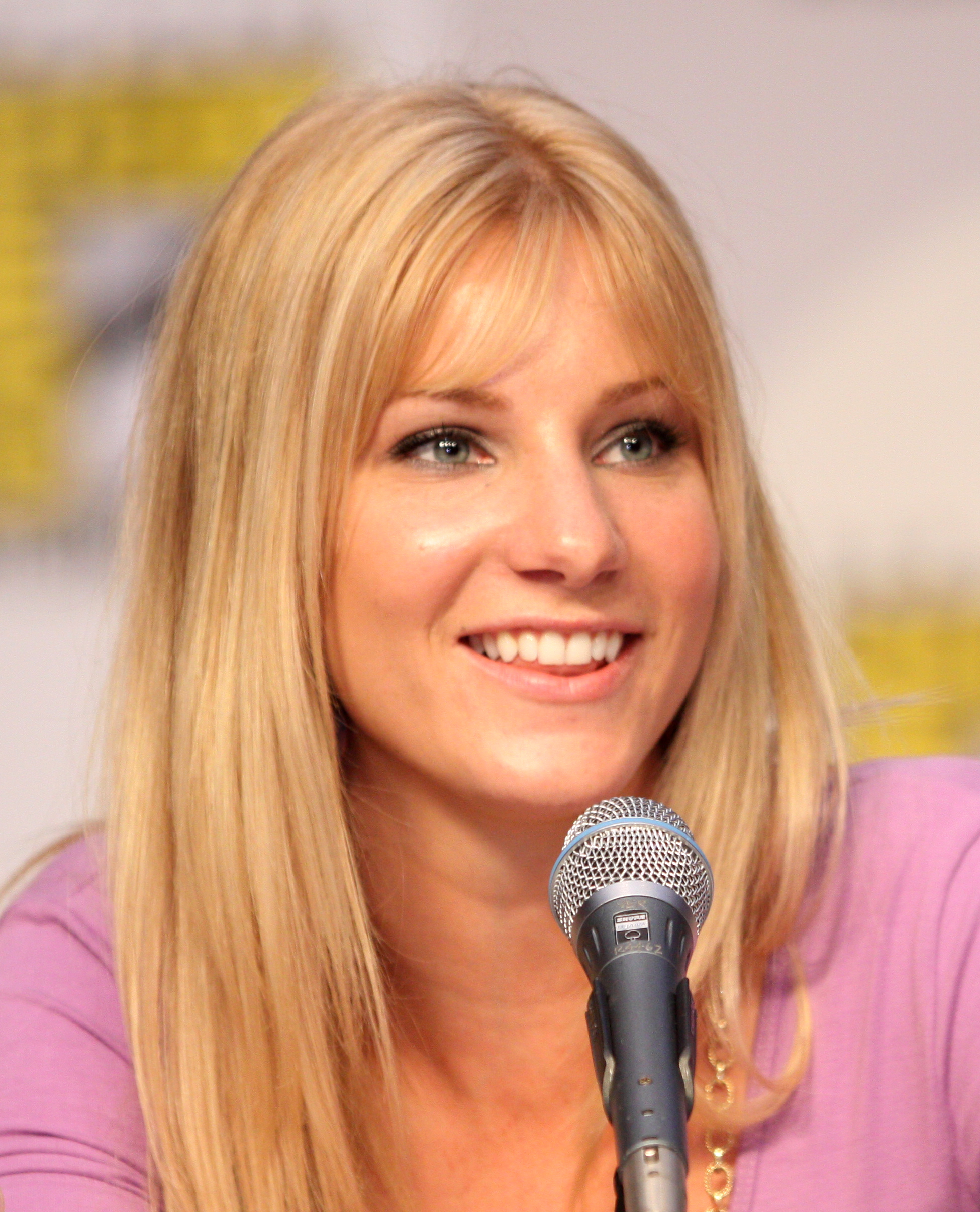
Heather Morris

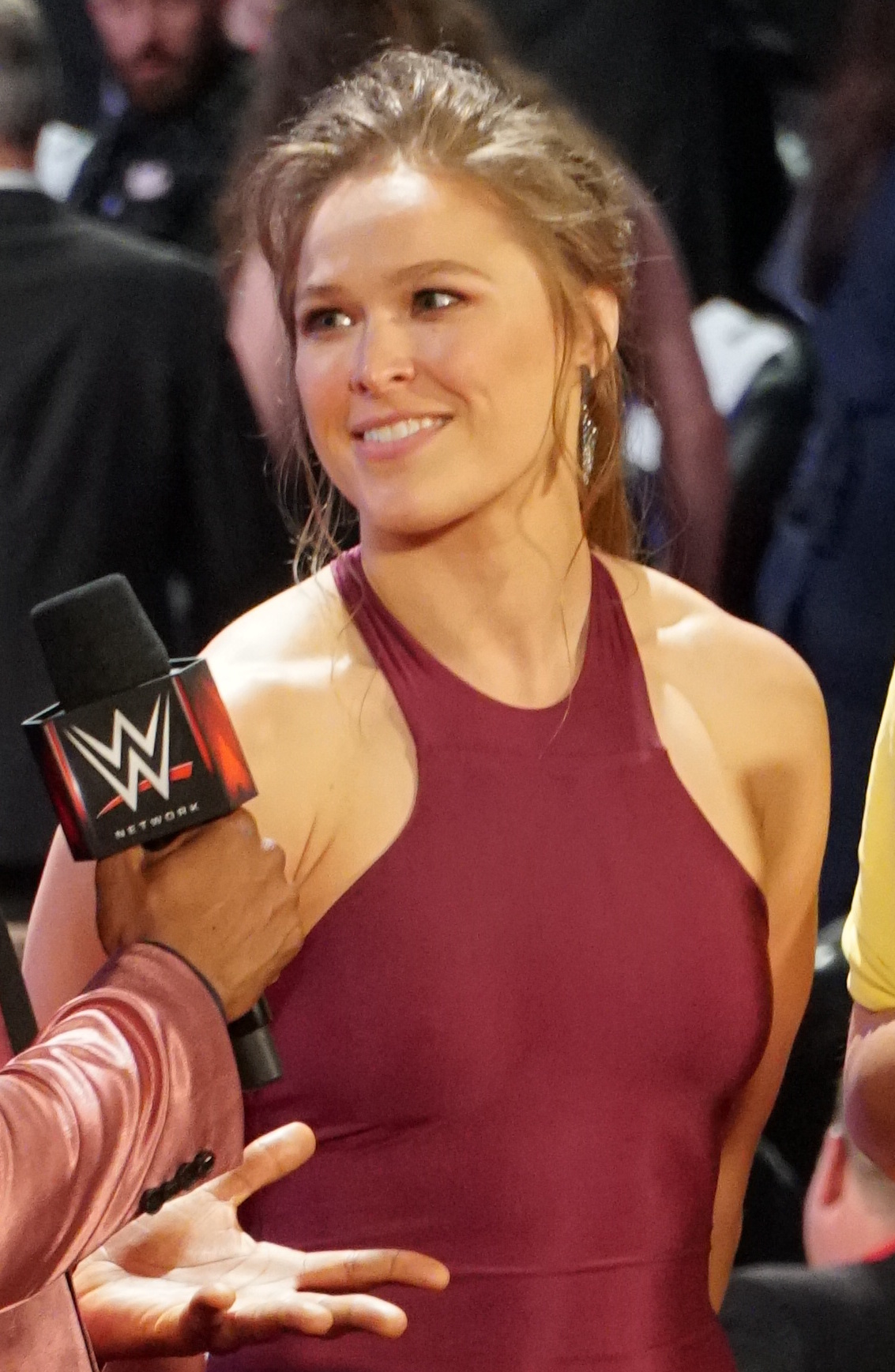
Ronda Rousey

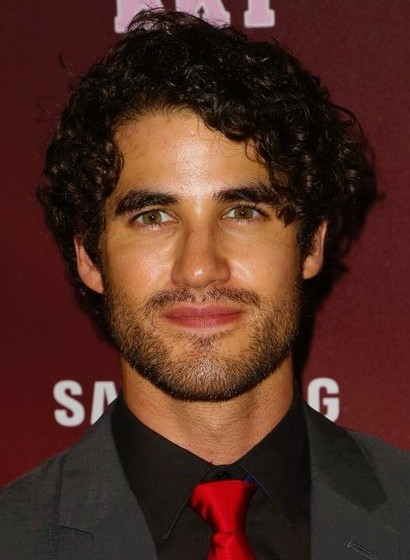
Darren Criss

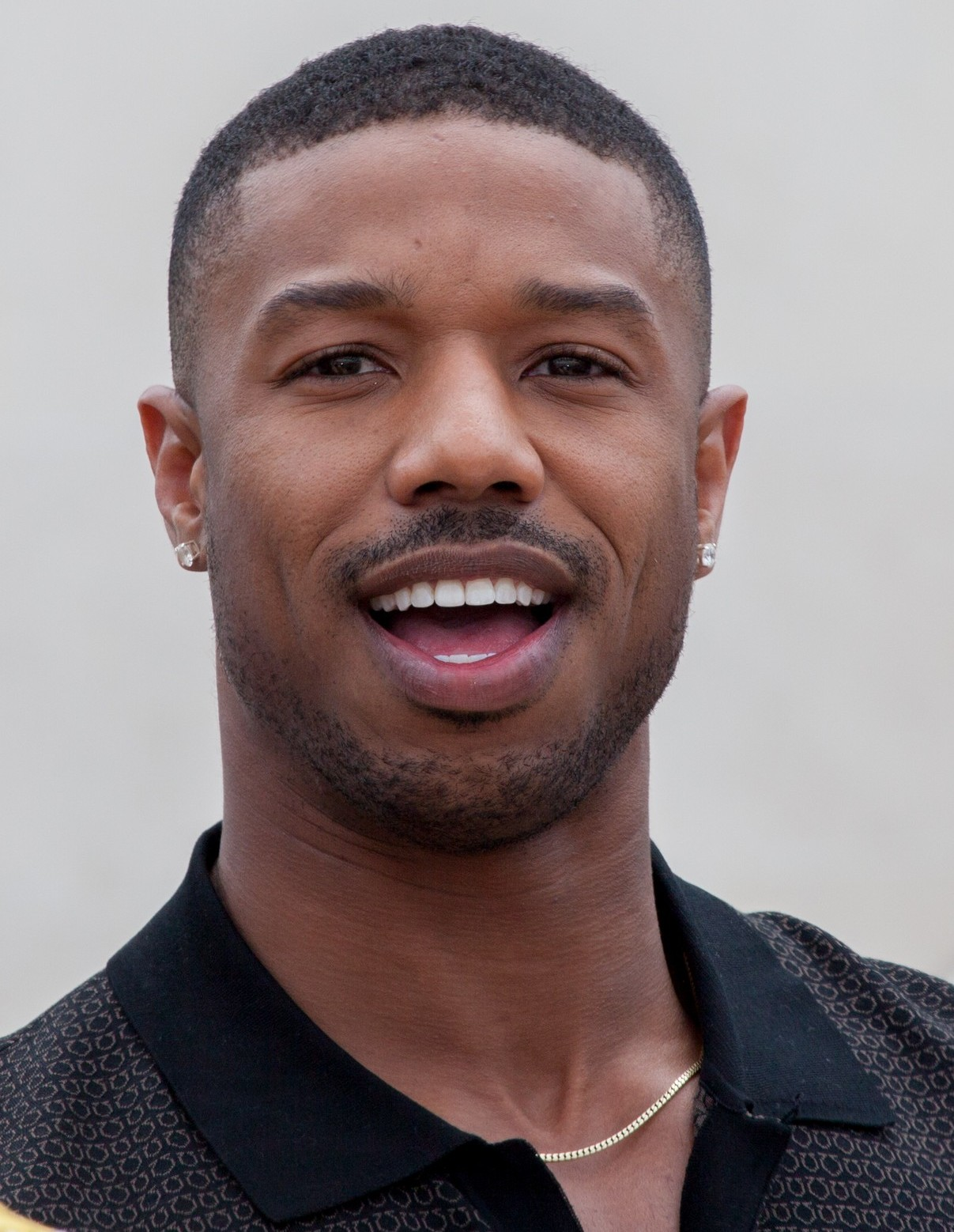
Michael B. Jordan

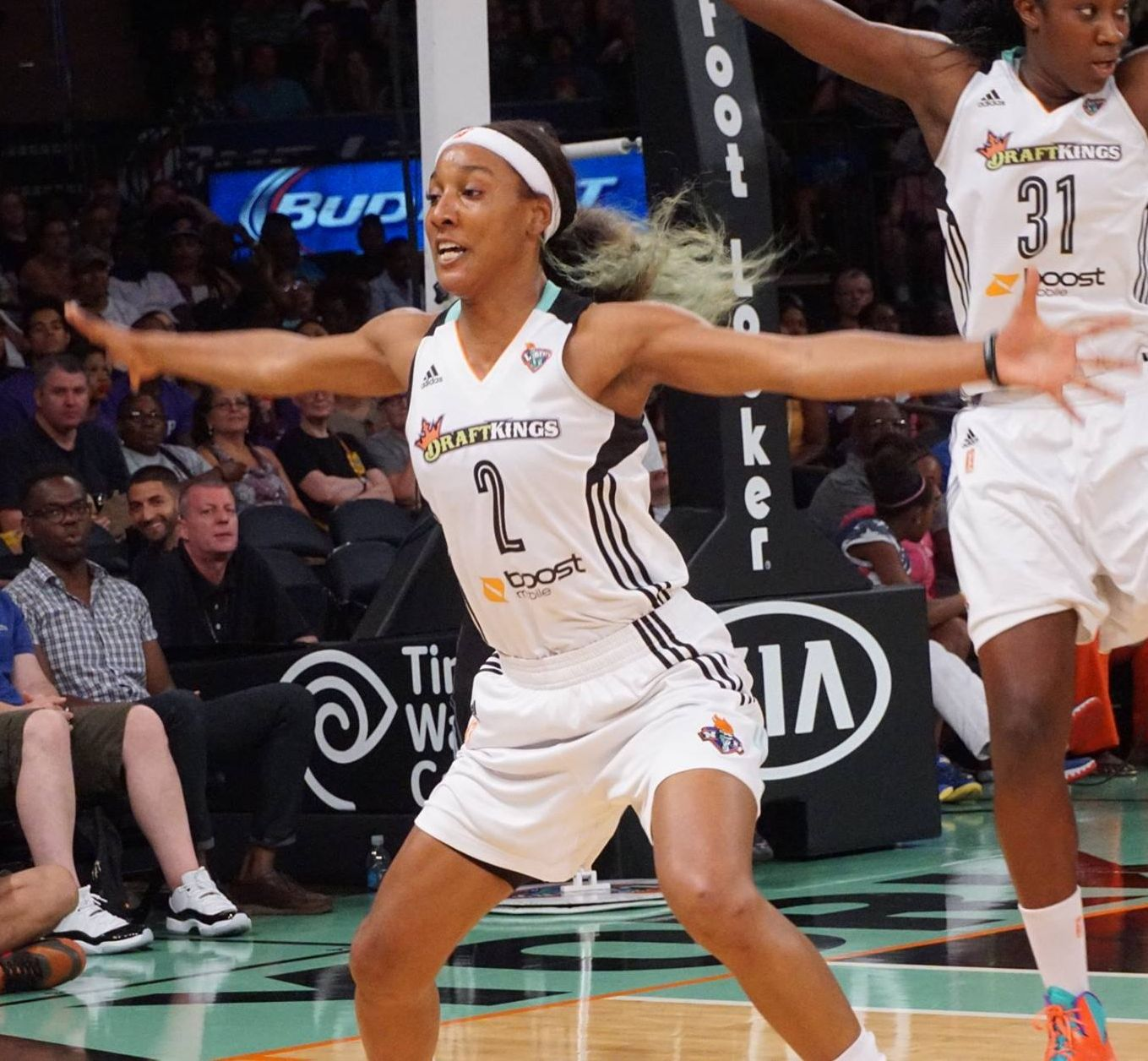
Candace Wiggins

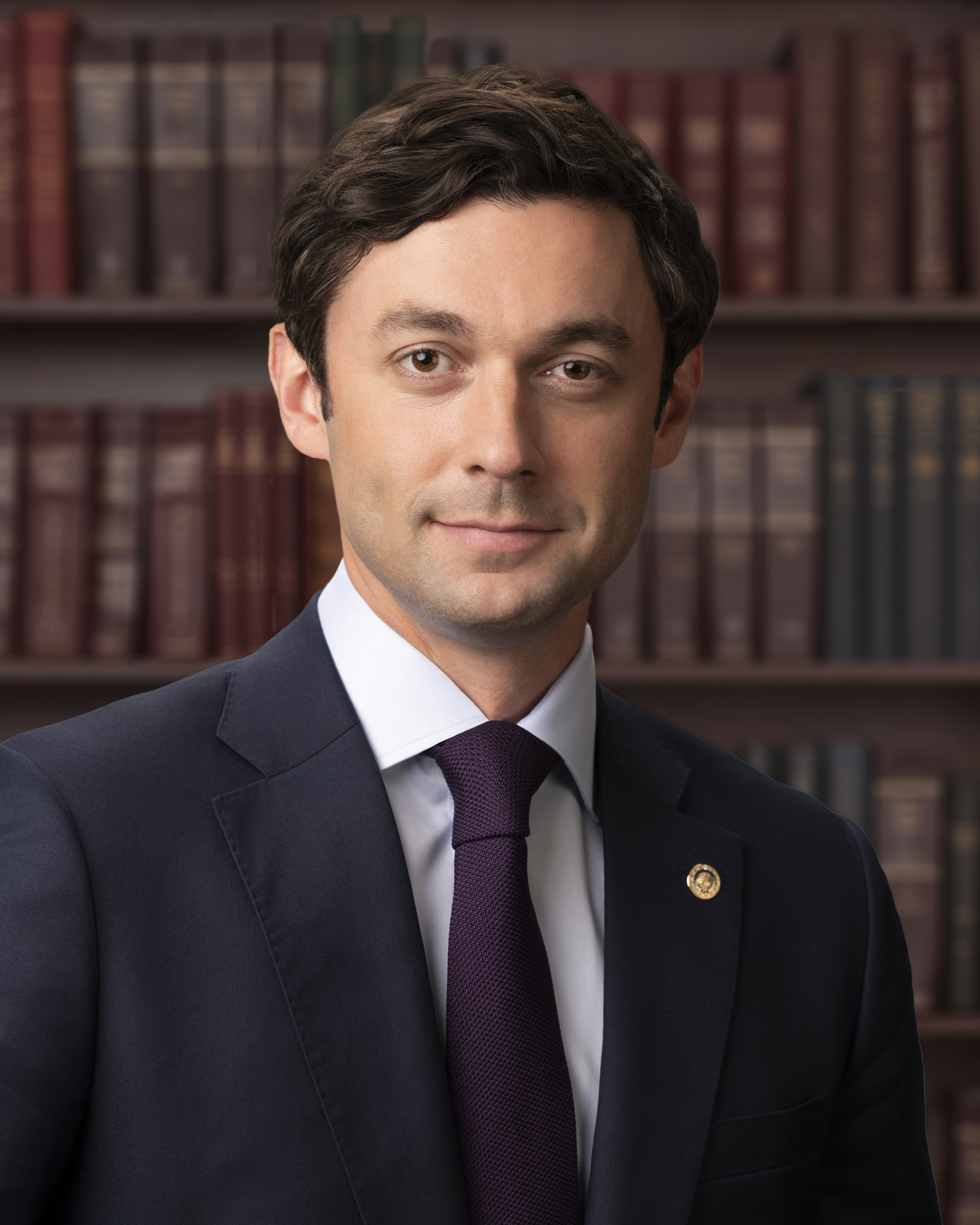
Jon Ossoff

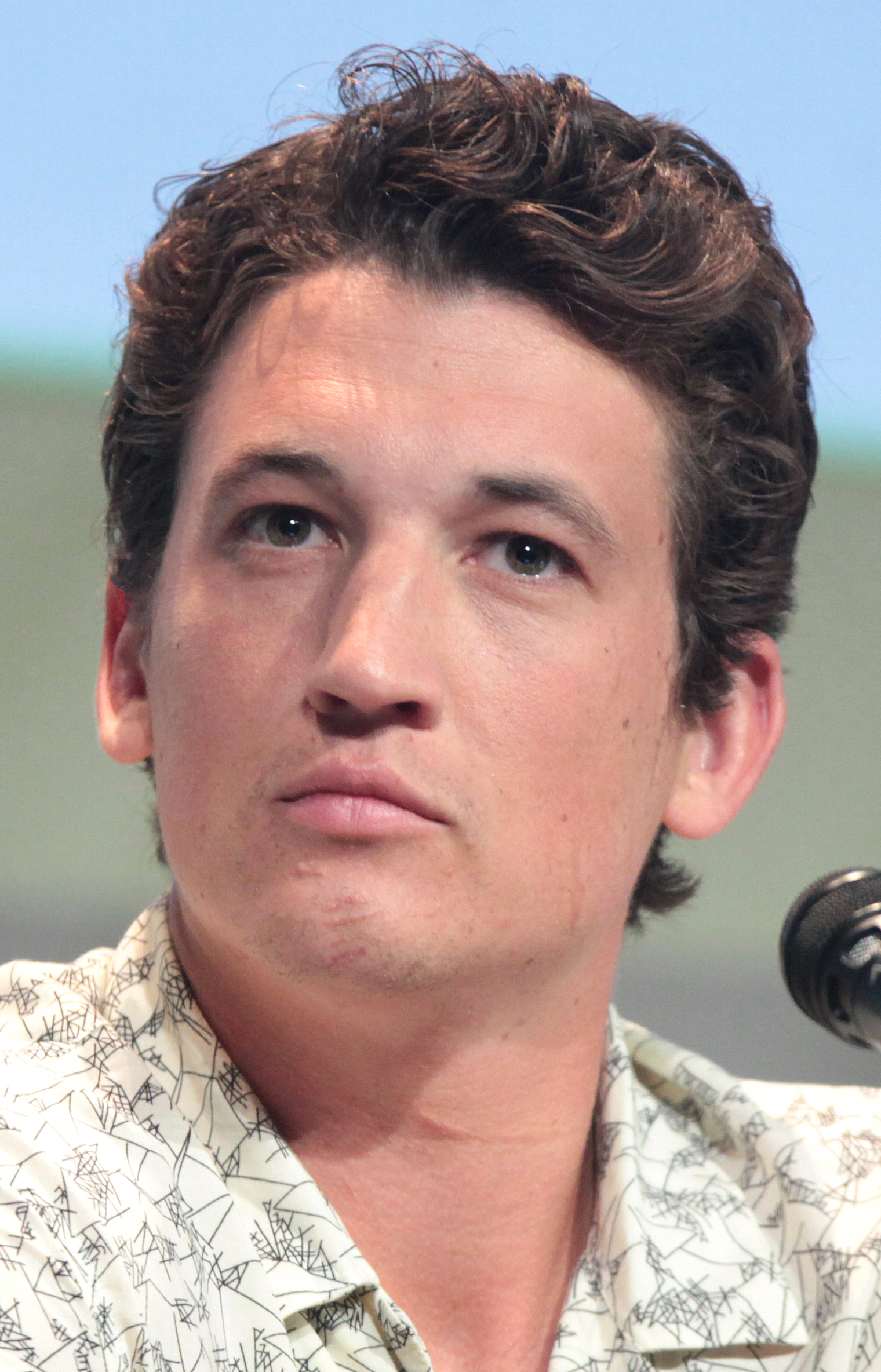
Miles Teller

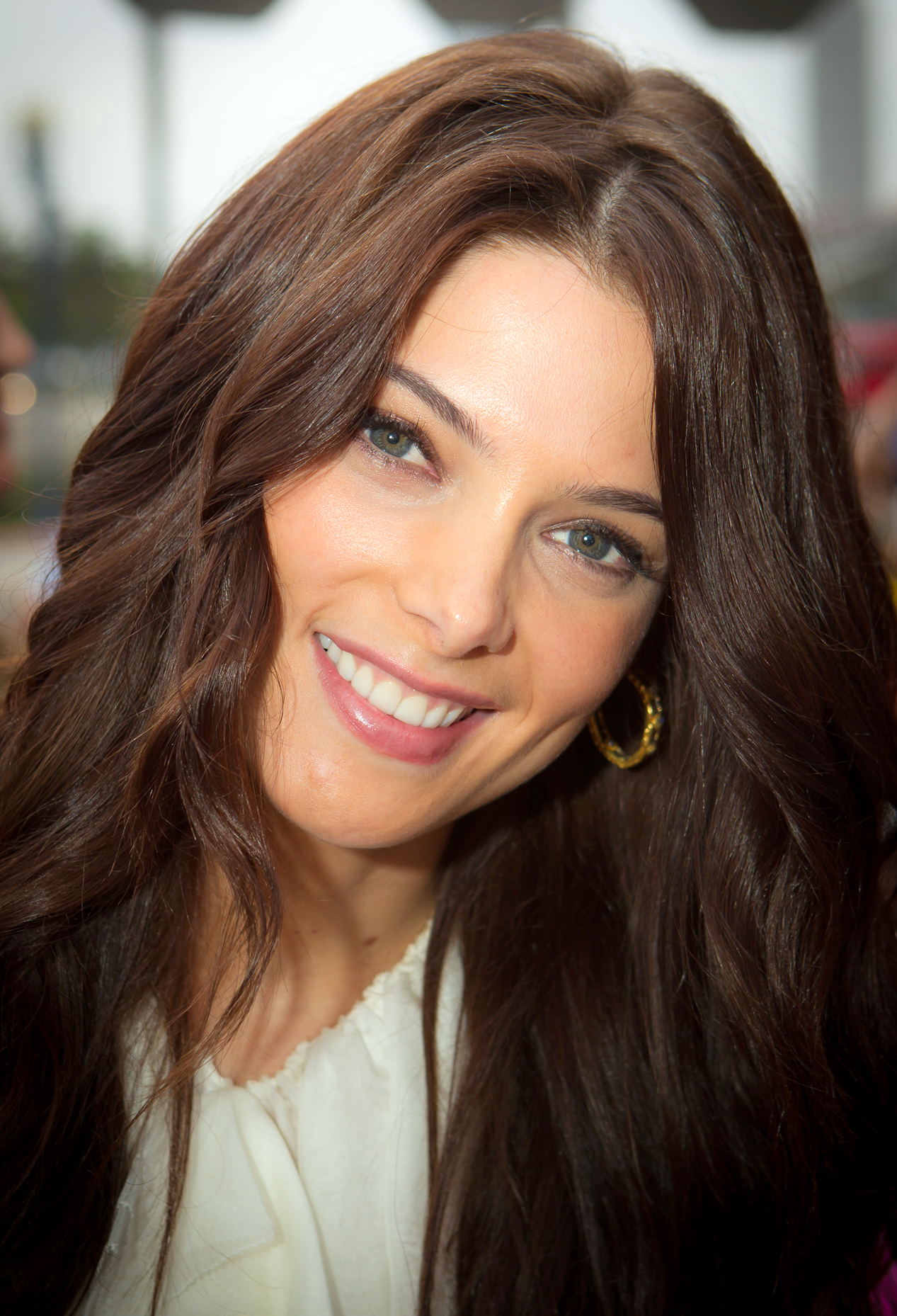
Ashley Greene

- February 1
  - Heather Morris, actress and dancer
  - Ronda Rousey, actress and mixed martial artist
- February 2
  - McKay Coppins, journalist and author
  - Martin Spanjers, actor
- February 4
  - Cameron Achord, football coach
  - Lewis Tan, British-born actor, martial artist, and model
- February 5
  - Adassa, reggaeton singer
  - Brandon Bender, mixed martial artist
  - Kyle Bochniak, mixed martial artist
  - Alex Brightman, actor, singer, and writer
  - Chris Brooks, football player
  - David Buehler, football player
  - Darren Criss, actor
  - Raymond Lee, actor
  - Donald Sanford, American-born Israeli Olympic sprinter
- February 6
  - Pedro Álvarez, baseball player
  - J. J. Ambrose, mixed martial artist
  - Robb Brent, stock car racing driver
  - Malaya Drew, actress
- February 7 – Cynthia Barboza, volleyball player
- February 8 – Jessica Jerome, Olympic ski jumper
- February 9
  - Henry Cejudo, mixed martial artist
  - Michael B. Jordan, actor and producer
- February 10
  - Devon Alexander, boxer
  - Anastasia Ashley, surfer and model
  - Justin Braun, ice hockey player
- February 11
  - Mara Allen, rower
  - Matt Besler, soccer player
  - Brian Matusz, baseball player (d. 2025)
- February 12
  - David Cooper, baseball player
  - Gary LeRoi Gray, actor
- February 13
  - Ryan Buchter, baseball player
  - Steven Dehler, model, actor, and dancer
  - Aileen Geving, Olympic curler
  - Rau'shee Warren, boxer
- February 14
  - Marquez Branson, football player
  - Don Carey, football player
  - Joe Pichler, actor missing From 2006
  - Candace Wiggins, basketball player
- February 15 – Chris Cook, football player
- February 16
  - Leslie Cole, sprinter
  - Jon Ossoff, politician
- February 17
  - Brady Beeson, football player
  - Da'Mon Cromartie-Smith, football player
  - Jon Curran, golfer
  - Danny Farquhar, baseball player
  - Tiquan Underwood, football player
- February 18
  - Elijah Allan-Blitz, actor, musician, and director
  - Samantha Bosco, Paralympic cyclist
  - Steven Lawayne Nelson, convicted murderer (d. 2025)
- February 20
  - Taylor Boggs, football player
  - Miles Teller, actor
  - Daniella Pineda, actress
- February 21
  - Leilani Akiyama, judoka
  - Ashley Greene, actress and model
- February 23
  - Ab-Soul, rapper
  - Nyan Boateng, football player
- February 24 – Ulysses Cuadra, actor and voice actor
- February 25 – Natalie Dreyfuss, actress
- February 26
  - Landon Brown, politician
  - Mike Caussin, football player
- February 27
  - Alexandra Bracken, author
  - Gregory Brigman, Paralympic football player and soccer referee
- February 28
  - Anabelle Acosta, Cuban-born actress
  - Kaitlin Cochran, softball player
  - Michelle Horn, actress
  - Josh McRoberts, basketball player
  - Stephanie Sigman, Mexican-born actress

=== March ===
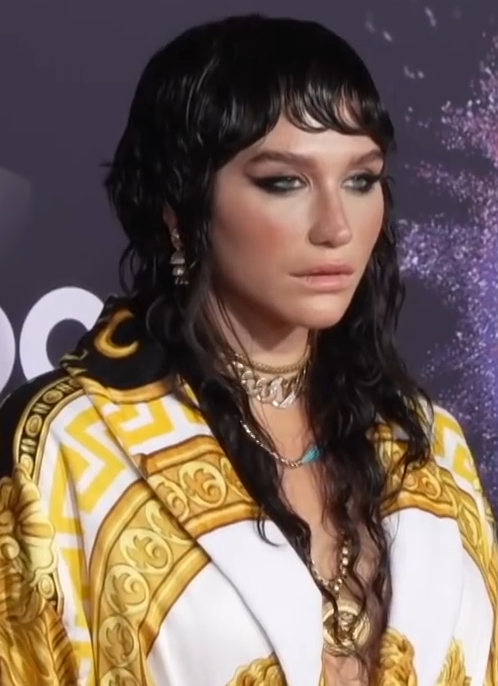
Kesha

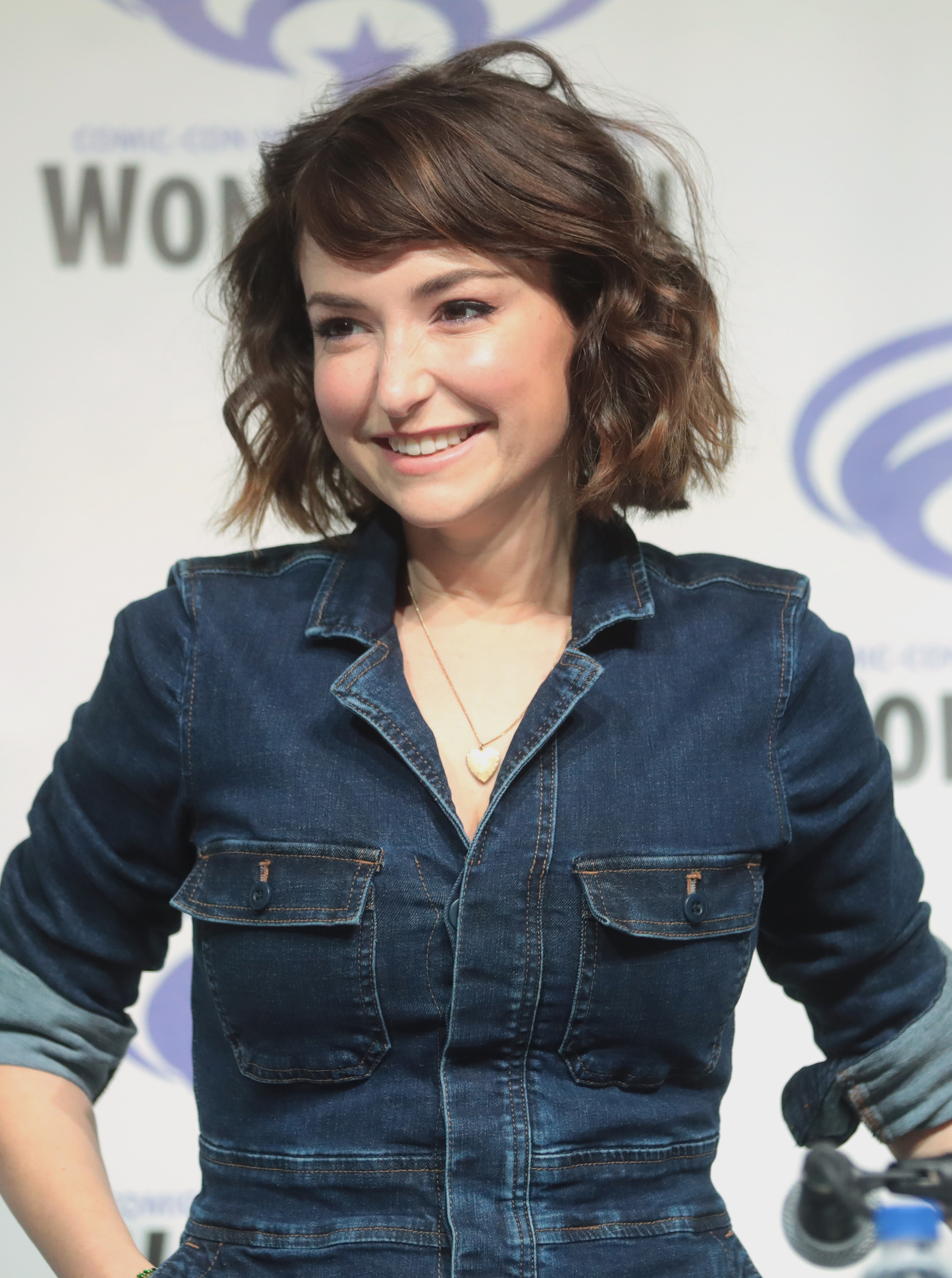
Milana Vayntrub

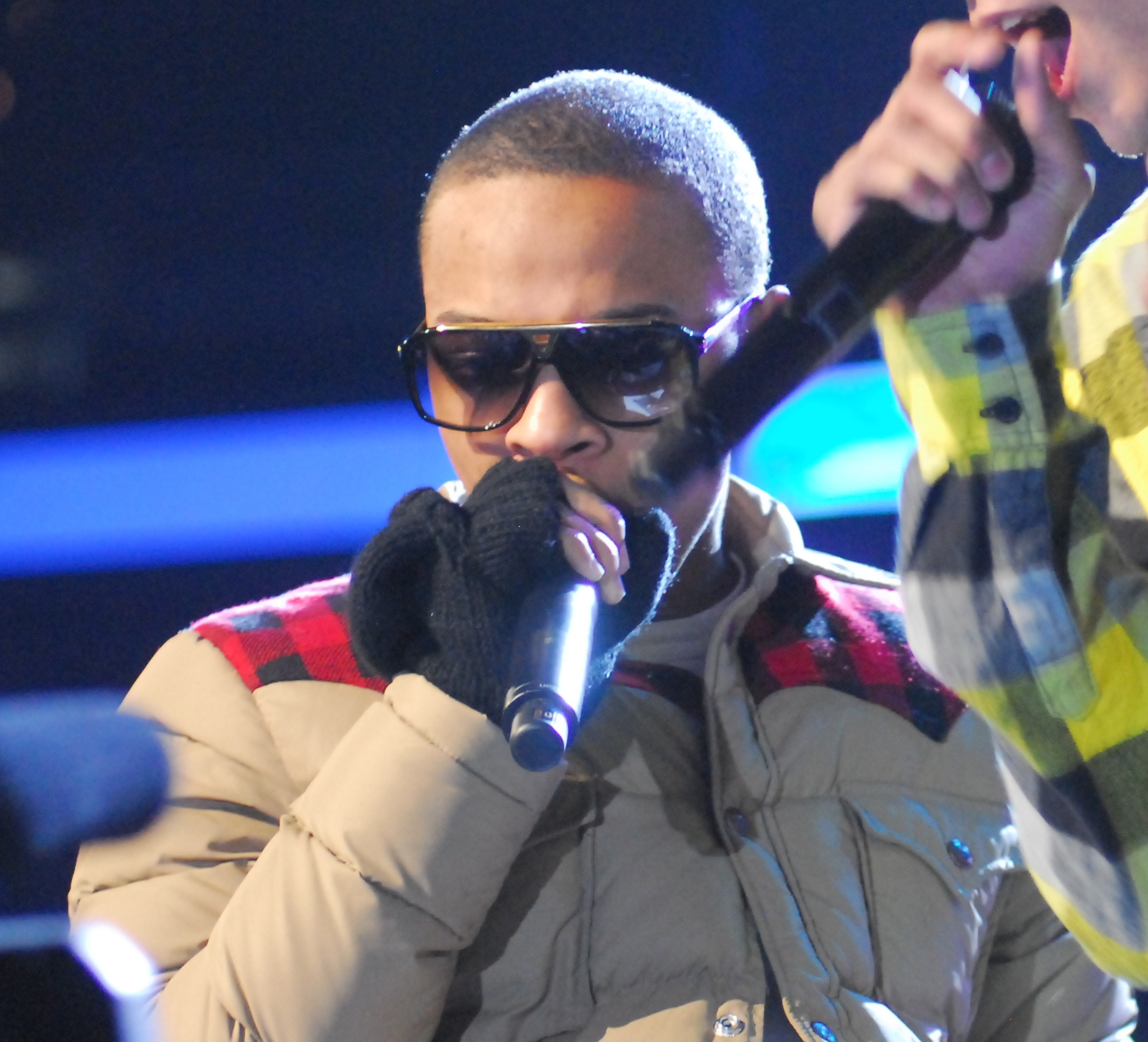
Bow Wow

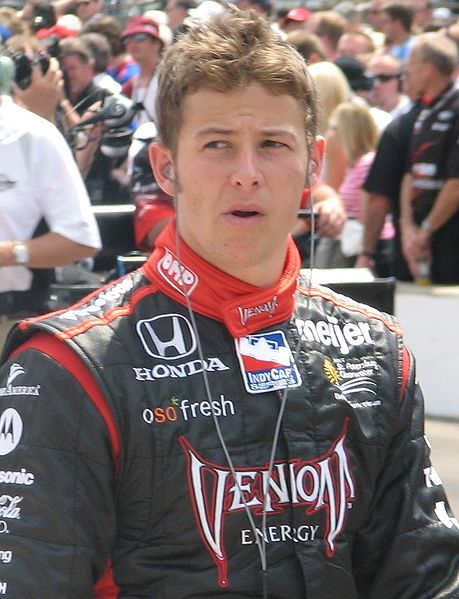
Marco Andretti

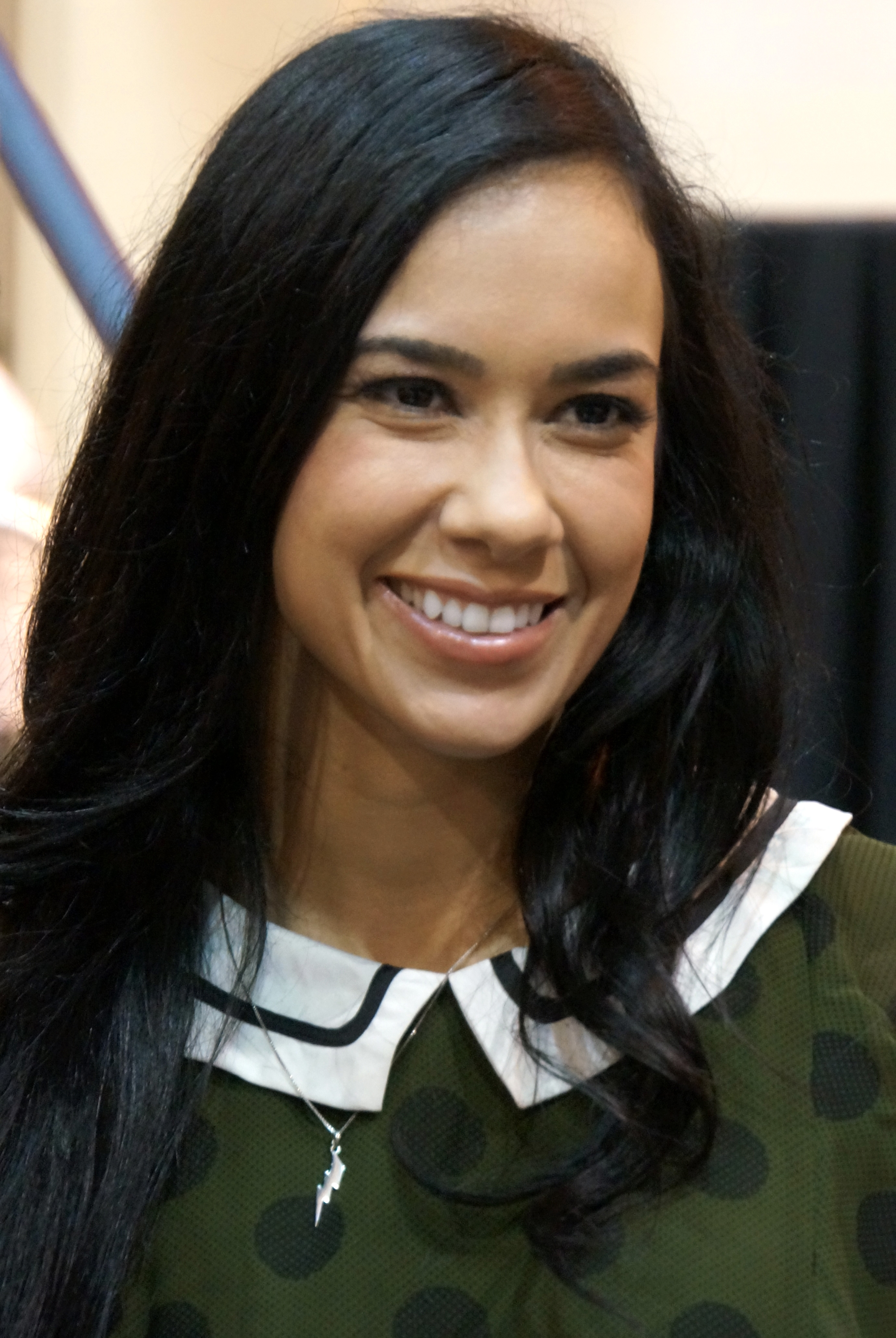
AJ Lee

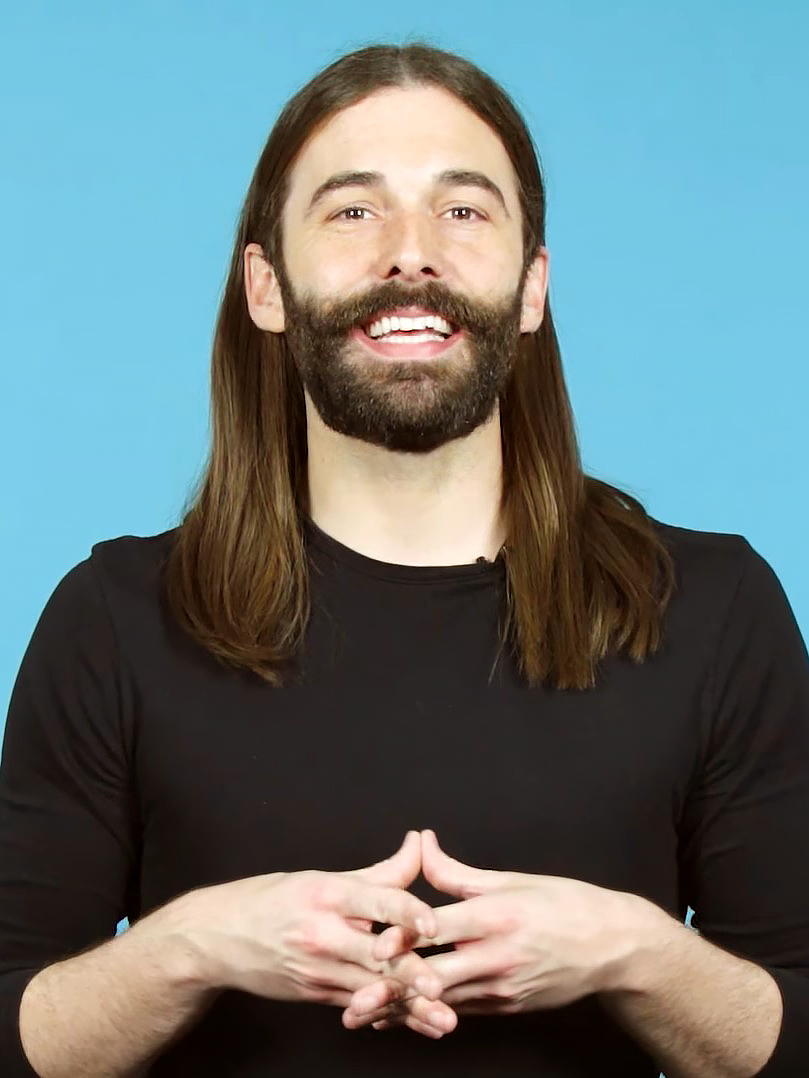
Jonathan Van Ness

- March 1
  - Navarone Garibaldi, singer
  - Kesha, singer
  - Sammie, singer/songwriter
- March 2
  - Chris Clements, soccer player
  - Brandon Corp, lacrosse player
- March 4 – Dan Cortes, baseball player
- March 7 – Justin Bamberg, politician
- March 8
  - Devon Graye, actor
  - Milana Vayntrub, Uzbek-born actress and comedian
- March 9 – Bow Wow, rapper
- March 10
  - Ser'Darius Blain, actor
  - Martellus Bennett, football player
  - Taylor Coutu, golfer
  - Corey Paul, Christian hip-hop artist
- March 11
  - Levi Brown, football player
  - Kristina Carrillo-Bucaram, writer, speaker, and raw vegan activist
- March 12
  - Jessica Hardy, Olympic swimmer
  - Maxwell Holt, volleyball player
- March 13 – Marco Andretti, race car driver
- March 14
  - Marisa Abegg, soccer player
  - Craig Austrie, basketball player
  - Andrew Bumbalough, middle and long-distance runner
  - Danny Chavez, mixed martial artist
  - Robert Clark, American-born Canadian actor
- March 15 – Steve Cilladi, baseball player
- March 17
  - Bryan Dechart, actor and Twitch streamer
  - Josh Gilbert, bassist, vocalist, songwriter and producer for As I Lay Dying and Wovenwar
  - Rob Kardashian, TV personality, model, and talent manager
  - Zach Villa, actor and musician
- March 18
  - Sherron Collins, basketball player
  - Rebecca Soni, Olympic swimmer
- March 19
  - Thana Alexa, jazz vocalist, composer, arranger, and producer
  - AJ Lee, wrestler
  - Josie Loren, actress
- March 20
  - DrLupo, YouTuber and Twitch streamer
  - Jon Brockman, basketball player
  - Zack Lively, actor
- March 21
  - Michael Brady, baseball player
  - Carlos Carrasco, Venezuelan-born baseball player
- March 22
  - Thomas Beadle, politician
  - Ike Davis, baseball player
  - Billy Kametz, actor (d. 2022)
- March 23 – Earl Bennett, football player
- March 24
  - Nate Carroll, football coach
  - Josh Zeid, baseball player
- March 25
  - Diego Barrera, Colombian-born soccer player
  - Stephen Belichick, football coach
  - Jason Castro, acoustic/folk-pop singer/songwriter and real estate agent
  - Kim Cloutier, Canadian-born model
- March 27
  - Peter and Will Anderson, twin jazz musicians
  - Buster Posey, baseball player
- March 28
  - Kagney Linn Karter, pornographic actress (d. 2024)
  - Mary Kate Wiles, actress
  - Jimmy Wong, actor and musician
  - Jonathan Van Ness, hairdresser and media personality
- March 30
  - Reggie Arnold, football player
  - Morgan Beck, volleyball player
  - Trent Beretta, wrestler
  - Andrew Berry, general manager & executive vice president of football operations
  - Mike Broadway, baseball player
- March 31
  - Peter Bourjos, baseball player
  - Justin Braun, soccer player

=== April ===
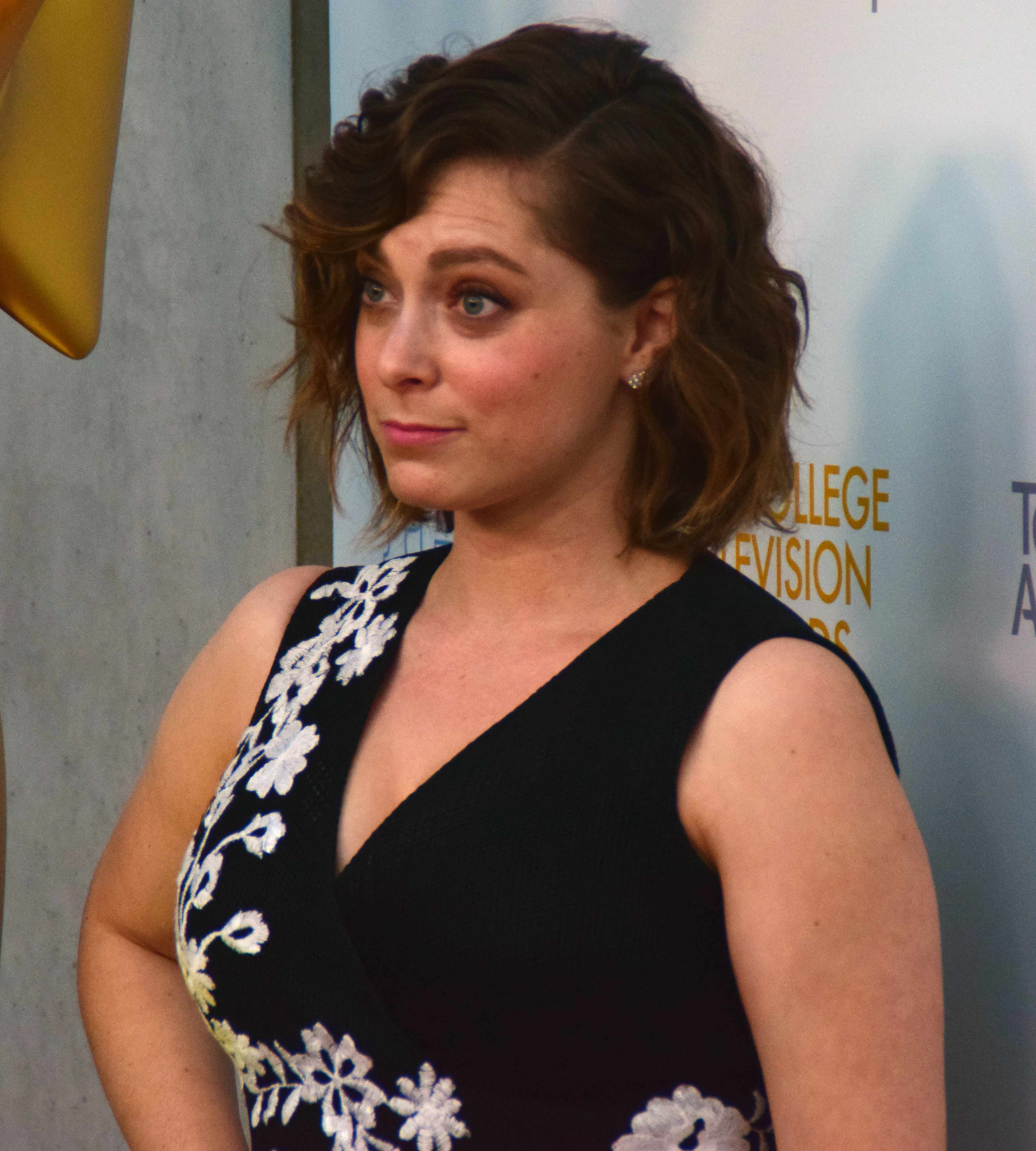
Rachel Bloom

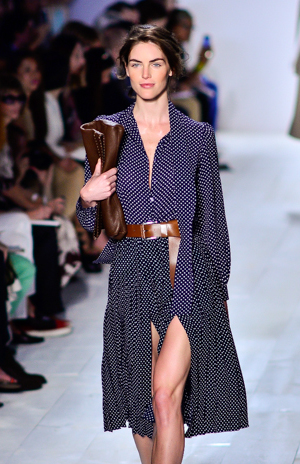
Hilary Rhoda

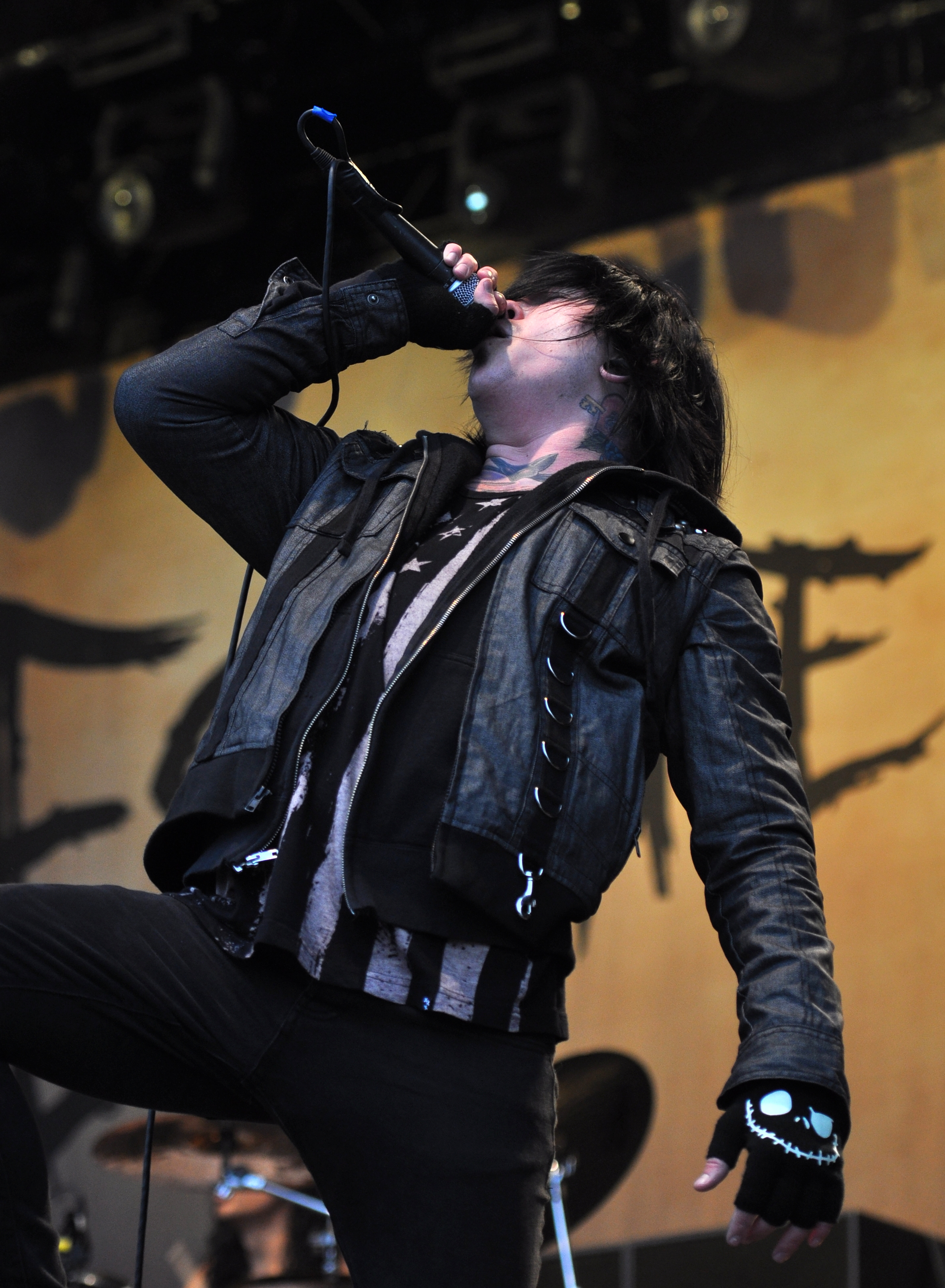
Craig Mabbitt

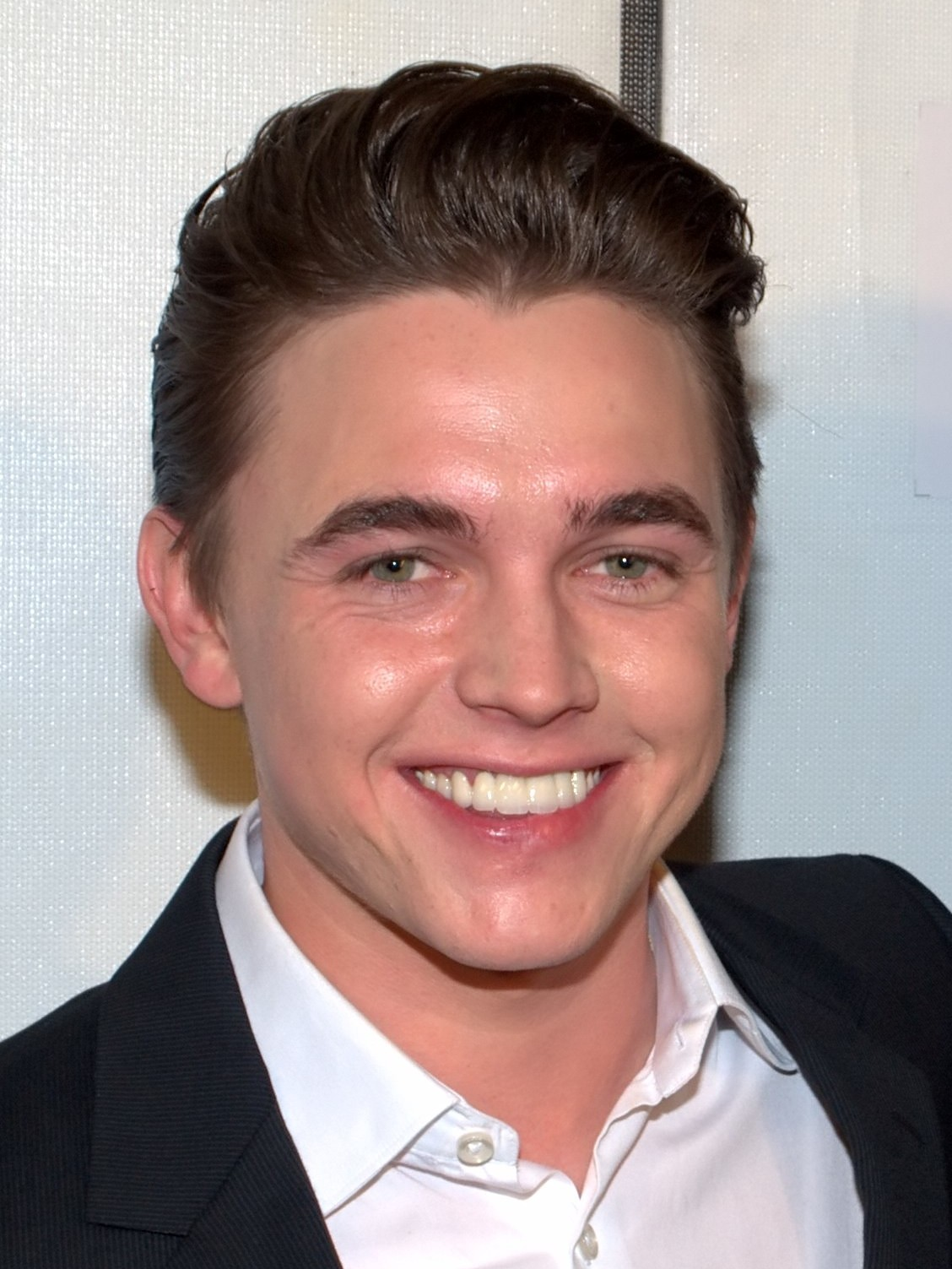
Jesse McCartney

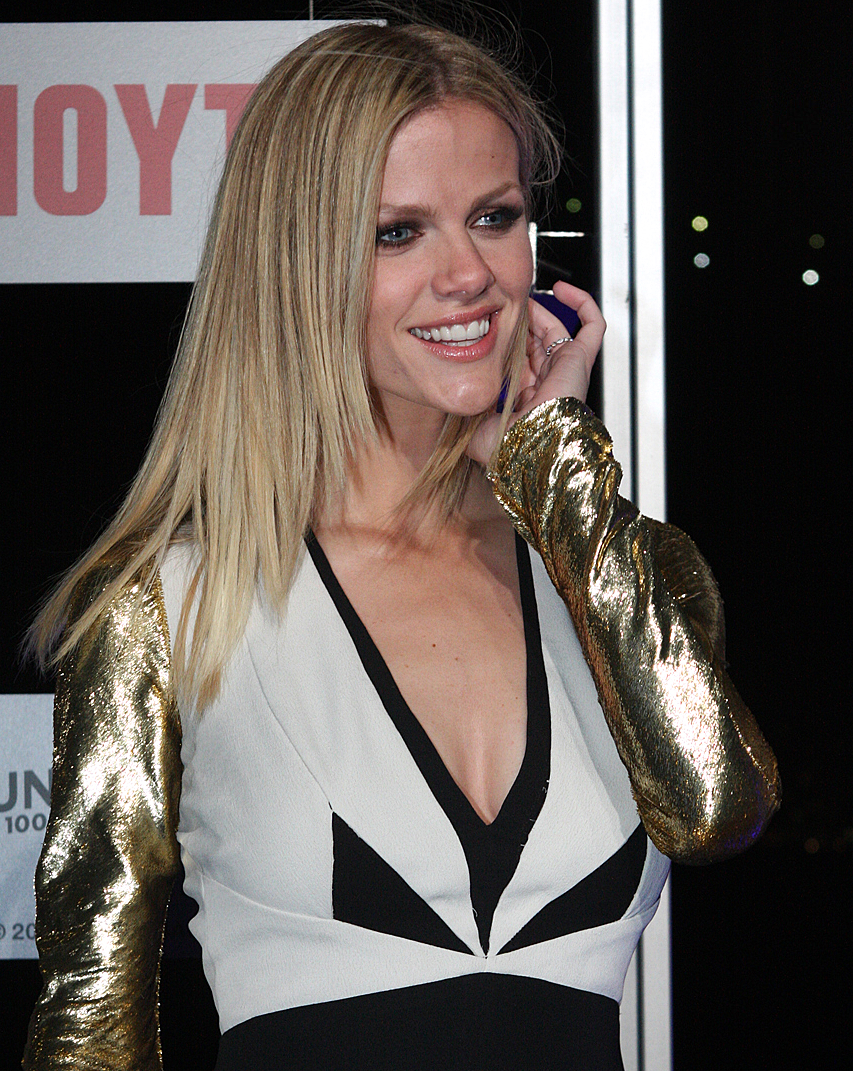
Brooklyn Decker

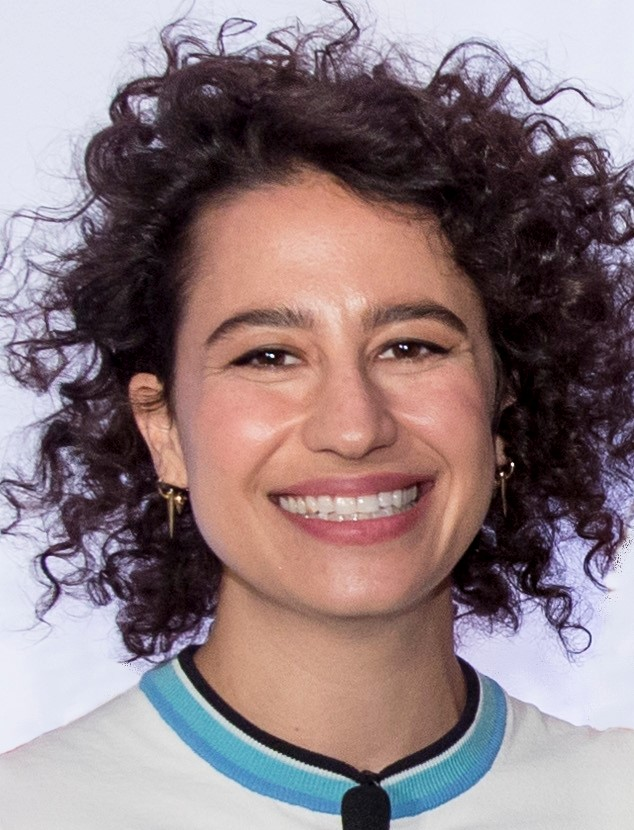
Ilana Glazer

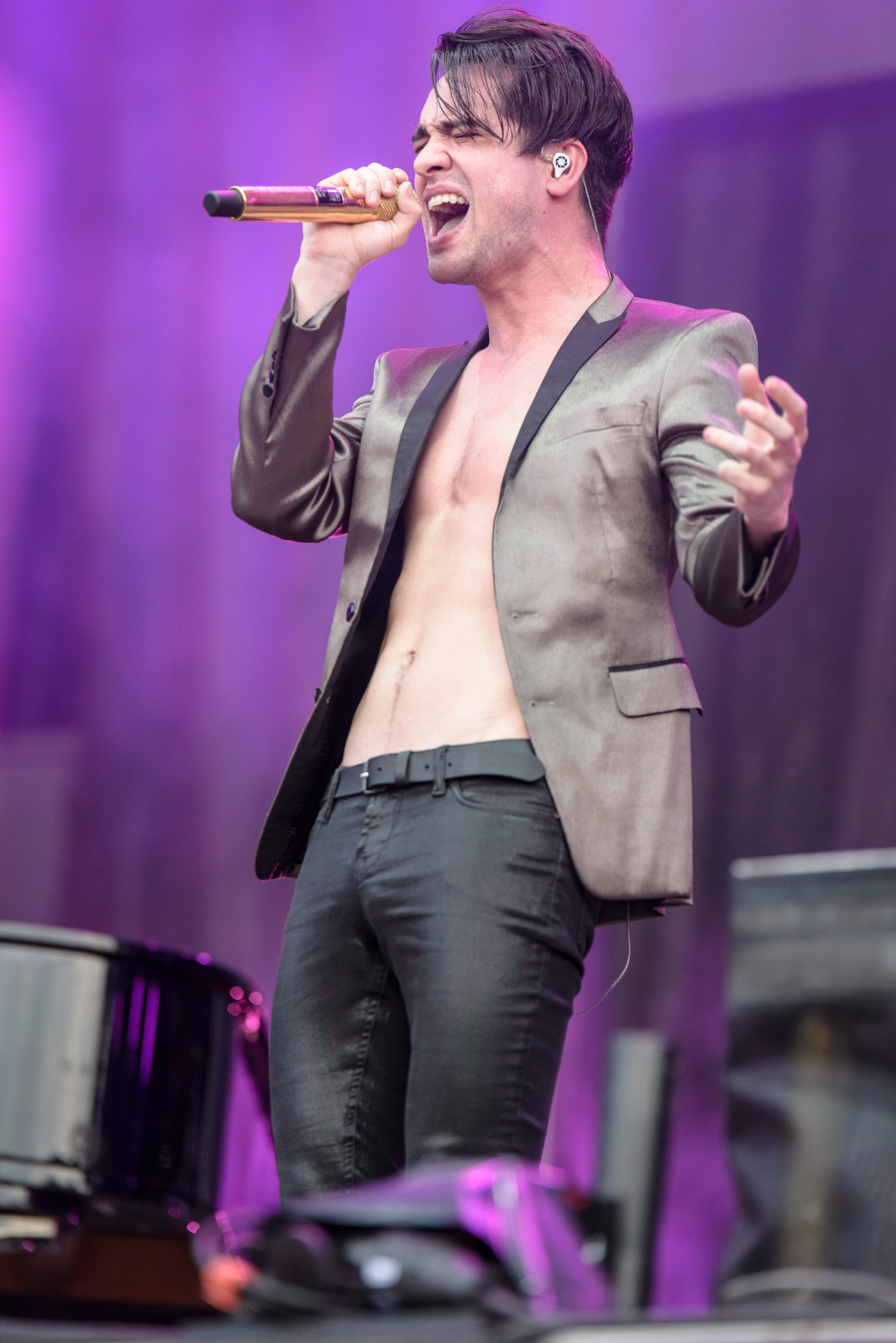
Brendon Urie

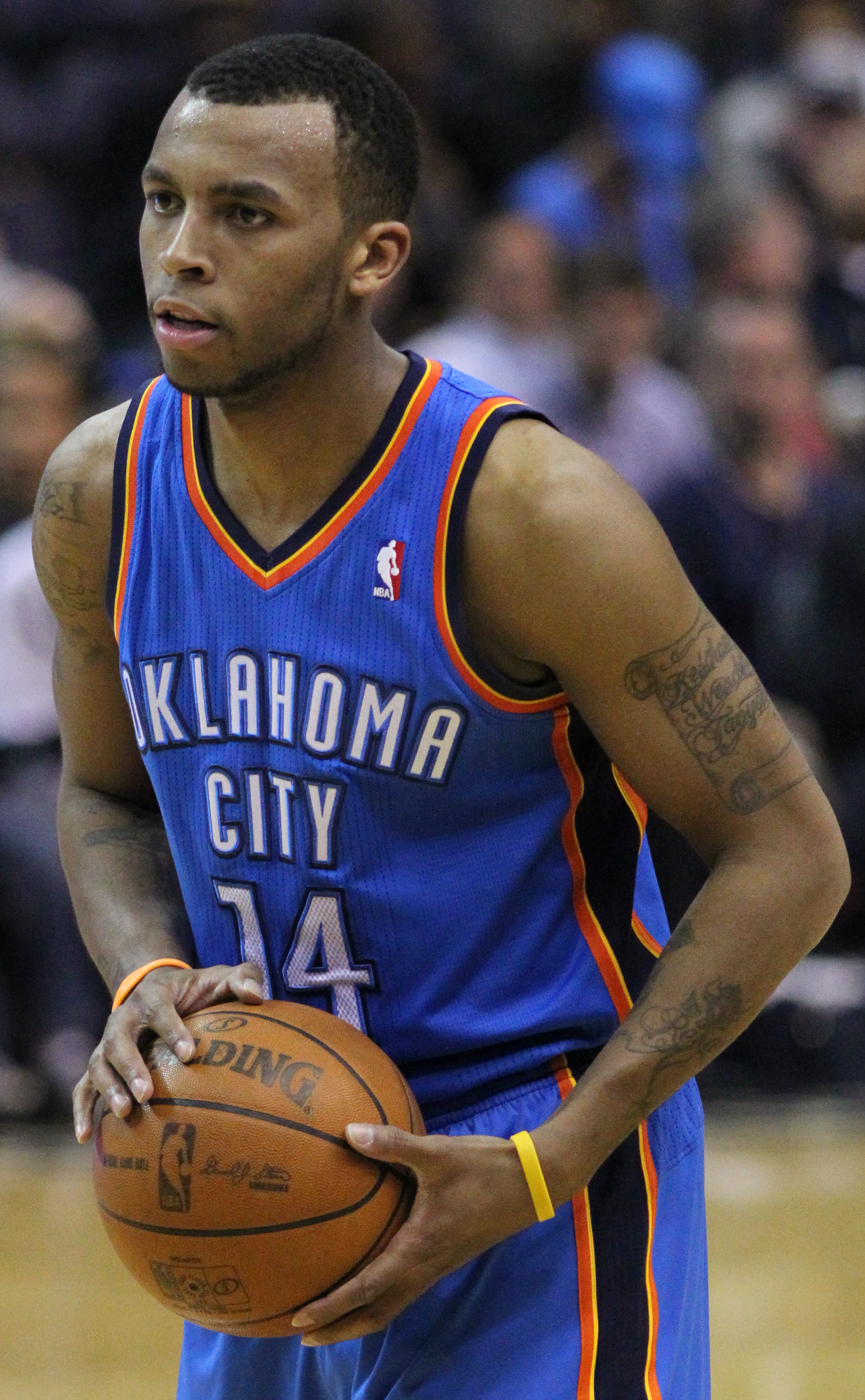
Daequan Cook

- April 3
  - Rachel Bloom, actress
  - Deryn Bowser, football player
  - Jay Bruce, baseball player
  - SethBling, video game commentator and Twitch video game live streamer
- April 6
  - Jerrod Carmichael, comedian, actor, and filmmaker
  - Hilary Rhoda, model
- April 7
  - Danny Almonte, Dominican-born baseball player
  - Jared Cook, football player
  - Evan Dollard, rock climber and television personality
  - Jack Johnson, actor
  - Maria Molina, meteorologist
- April 8 – Jake Anderson, basketball player
- April 9
  - Marc E. Bassy, singer/songwriter
  - Eric Campbell, baseball player
  - Craig Mabbitt, singer/songwriter, recording artist, and frontman for Escape the Fate
  - Jesse McCartney, actor and singer
  - Jazmine Sullivan, singer/songwriter
- April 10
  - J.R. Artozqui, football player
  - Charles Brown, football player
  - Jamie Renée Smith, actress
- April 11
  - Brittany Bock, soccer player
  - Donald Brown, football player
  - Michelle Phan, make-up demonstrator
- April 12
  - Jamelle Bouie, columnist for The New York Times
  - Brooklyn Decker, fashion model and actress
  - Ilana Glazer, comedian, writer and actress
  - Mike Manning, actor
  - Brendon Urie, singer, frontman for Panic! At The Disco, and stage actor
- April 13
  - Genevieve Angelson, actress
  - Jeremy Barnes, baseball player
  - Brandon Hardesty, comedian and actor
- April 14 – Michael Baze, jockey (d. 2011)
- April 15 – Samira Wiley, actress and model
- April 16
  - Justin Bibb, politician, mayor of Cleveland, Ohio
  - Richard Bleier, baseball player
  - Maricela Cornejo, boxer
  - Neil Haskell, actor and dancer
- April 18
  - Matt Anderson, volleyball player
  - Dustin Bell, football player
  - Jamelle Cornley, basketball player
  - Ellen Woglom, actress
- April 19 – Courtland Mead, actor
- April 20
  - John Patrick Amedori, actor and musician
  - Dusty Coleman, baseball player
- April 21
  - Ryan Adams, baseball player
  - Eryk Anders, mixed martial artist
  - Justin Carter, basketball player
  - Abel Cullum, mixed martial artist
- April 22
  - Kacey Bellamy, ice hockey player
  - Blackie, musician and record producer
  - Dante Cunningham, basketball player
  - Brandon Tatum, political commentator
- April 23
  - Summit1g, twitch streamer and esports athlete
  - T-Bar, wrestler
- April 24
  - Brooke Barbuto, soccer player
  - Anjelica Castillo, murder victim (d. 1991)
- April 26
  - Justin Bibb, politician
  - Bobby Butler, ice hockey player
  - Jessica Lee Rose, actress
- April 27
  - Charlie Berens, journalist, comedian, and creator of "Manitowoc Minute"
  - Jamal Boykin, basketball player
  - Taylor Chorney, Canadian-born ice hockey player
- April 28
  - Ryan Adeleye, American-born Israeli soccer player
  - Patrick Branco, politician
  - Daequan Cook, basketball player
- April 29
  - Jeff Ayres, basketball player
  - Alejandro Bedoya, soccer player
  - Alicia Morton, actress and singer
- April 30 – Al Iaquinta, mixed martial artist

=== May ===
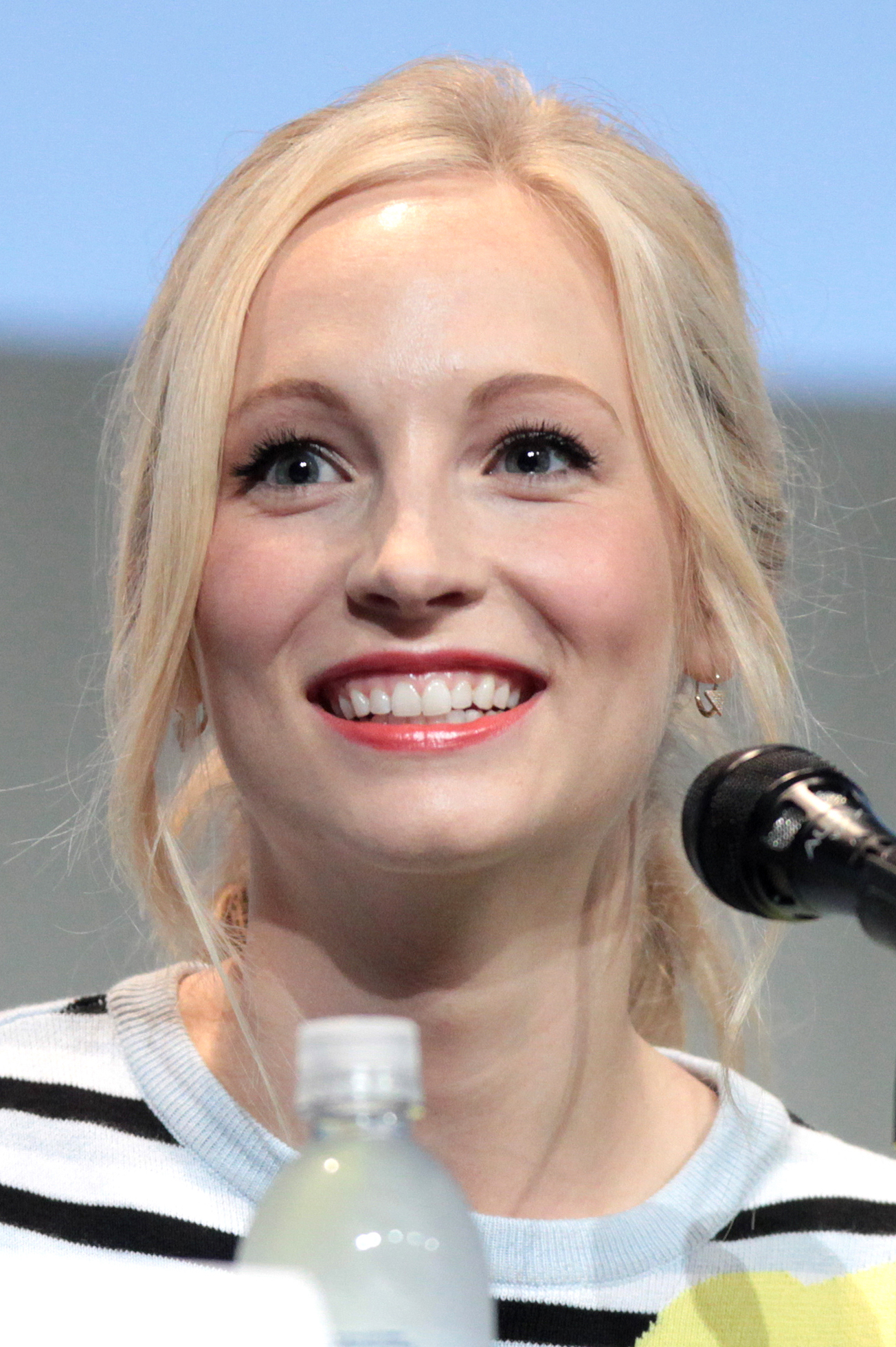
Candice King

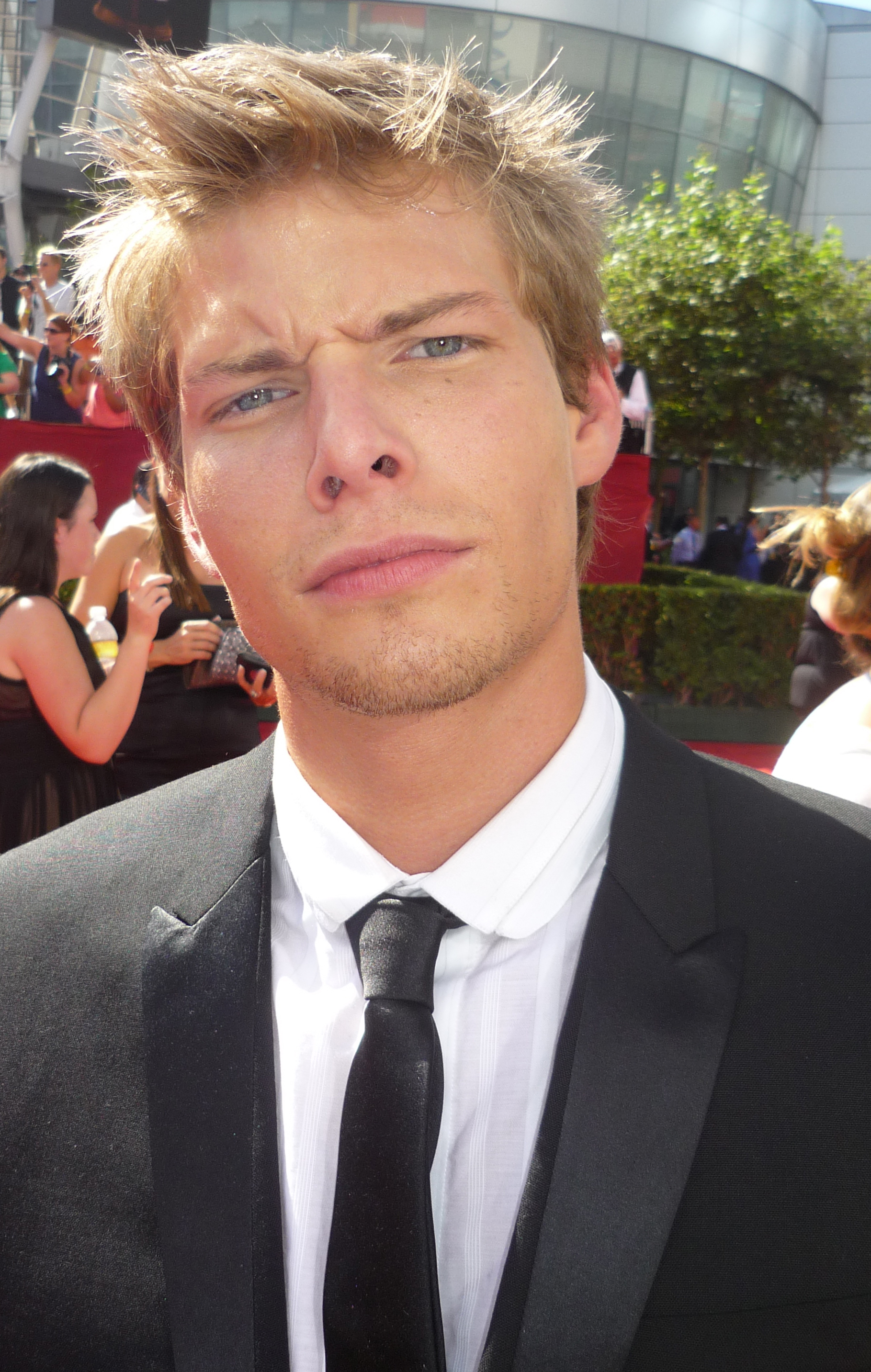
Hunter Parrish

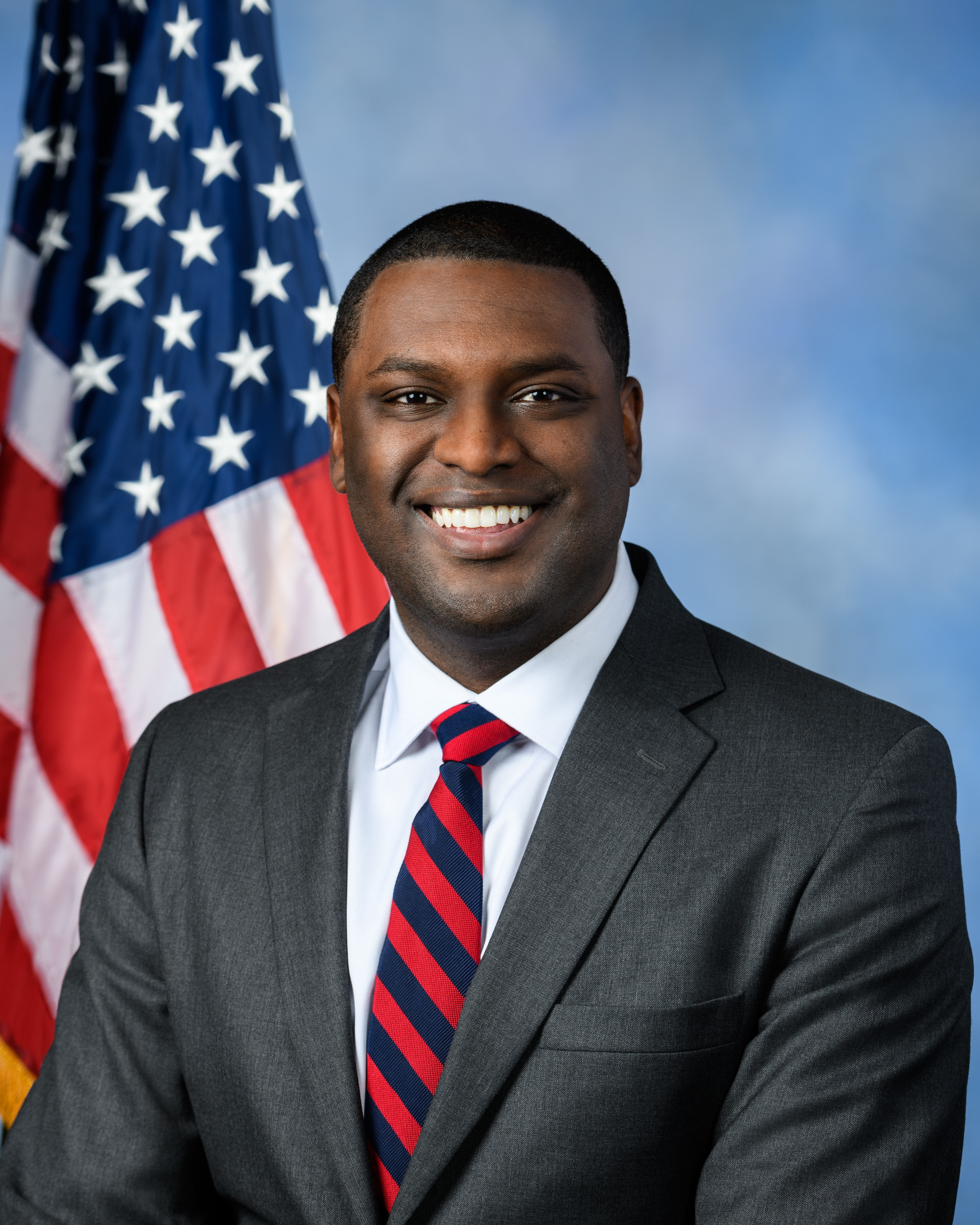
Mondaire Jones

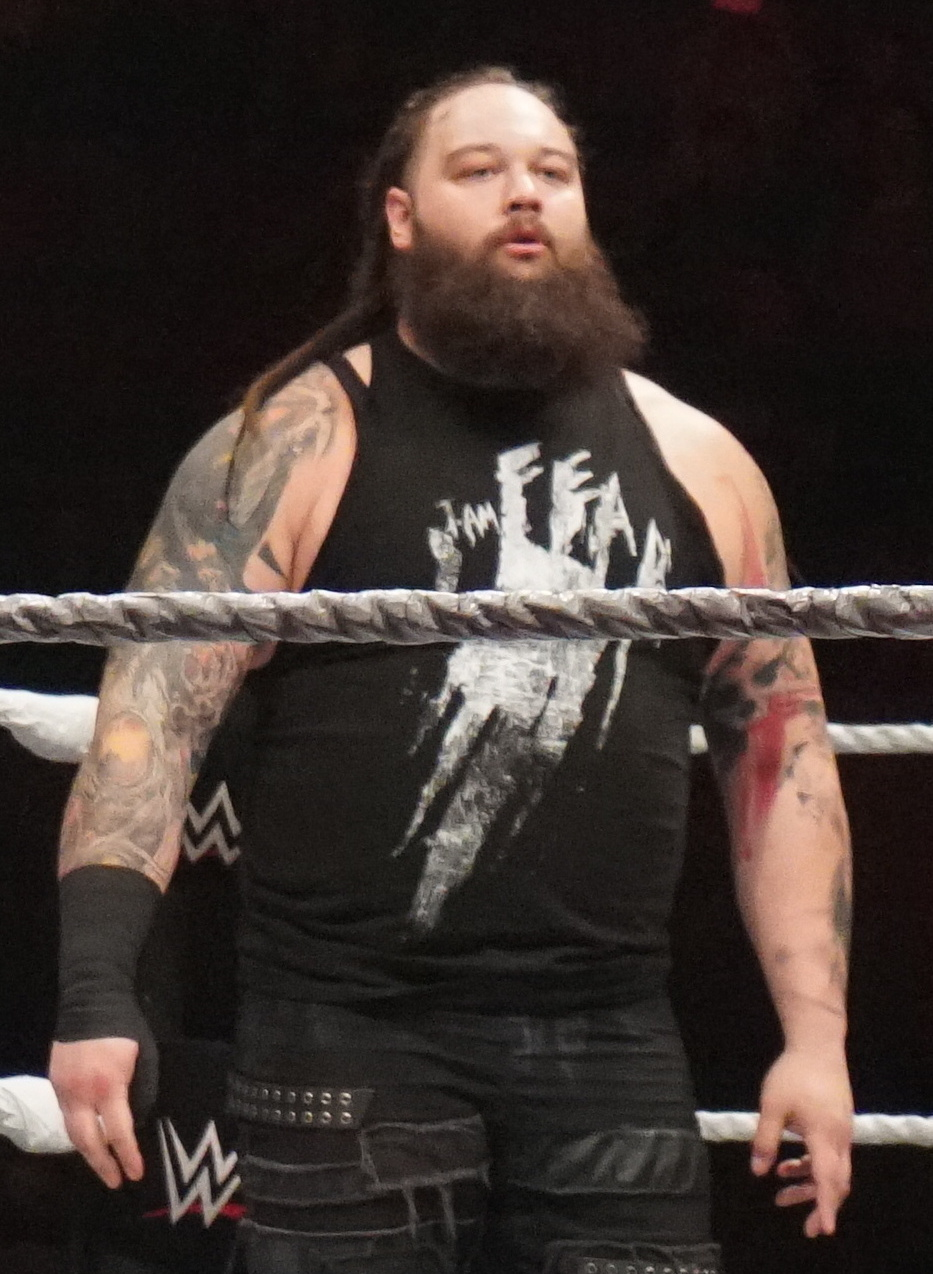
Bray Wyatt

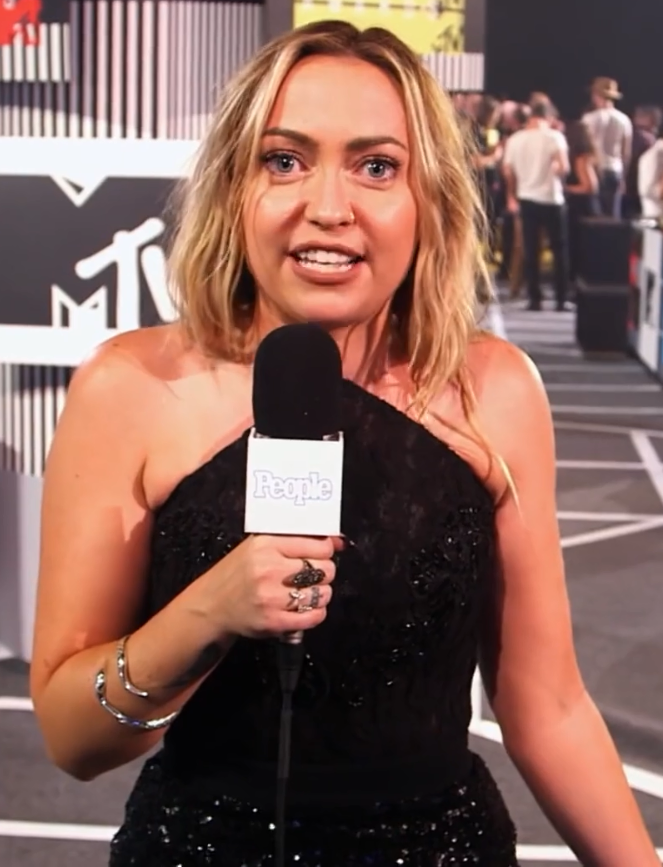
Brandi Cyrus

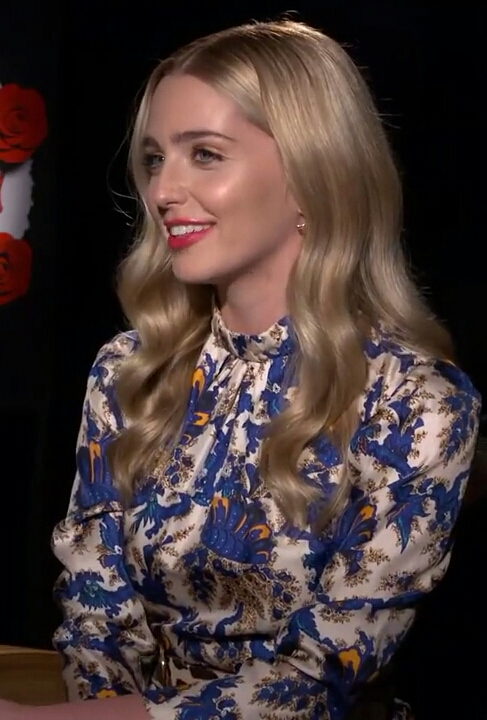
Jessica Rothe

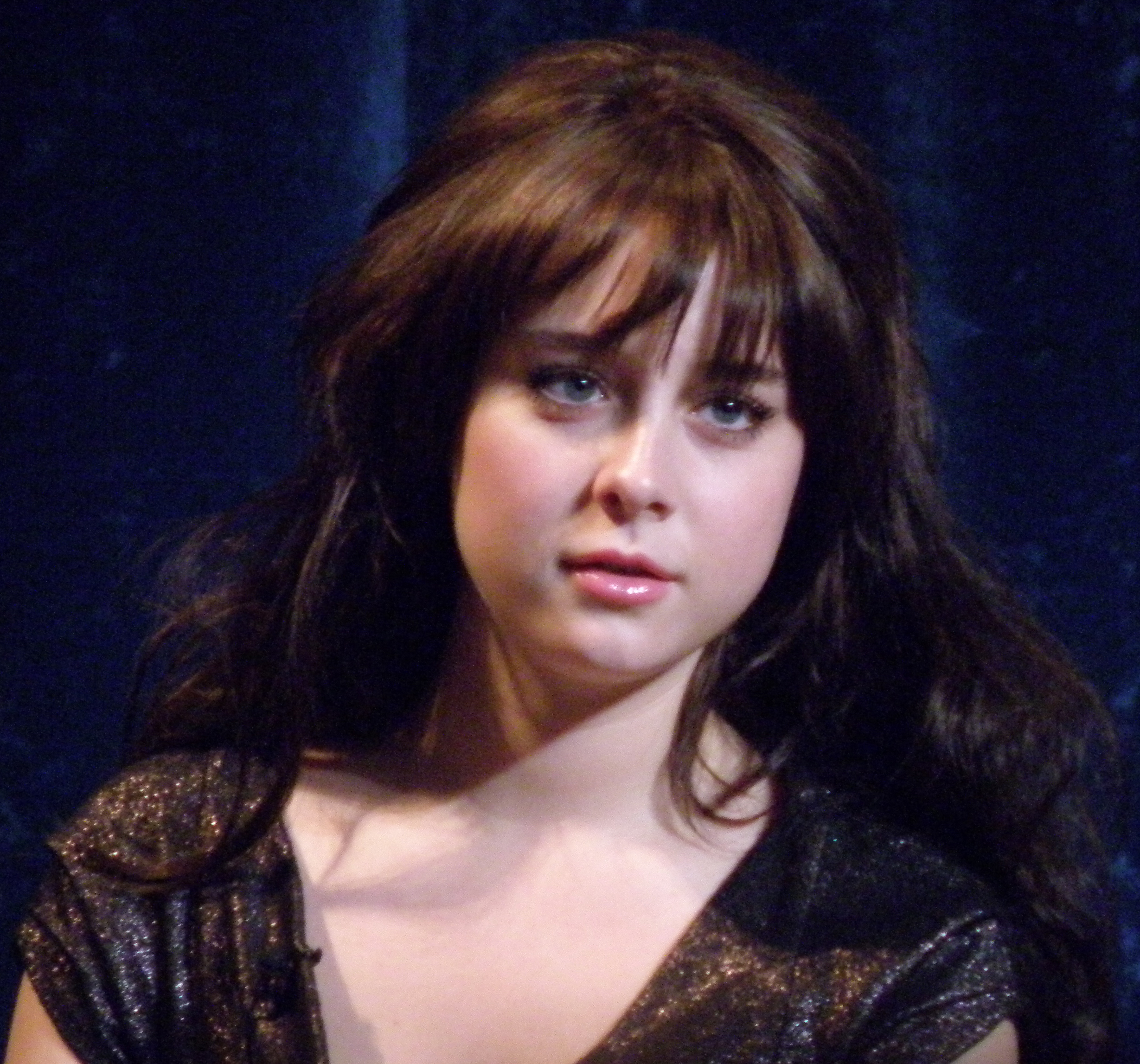
Alessandra Torresani

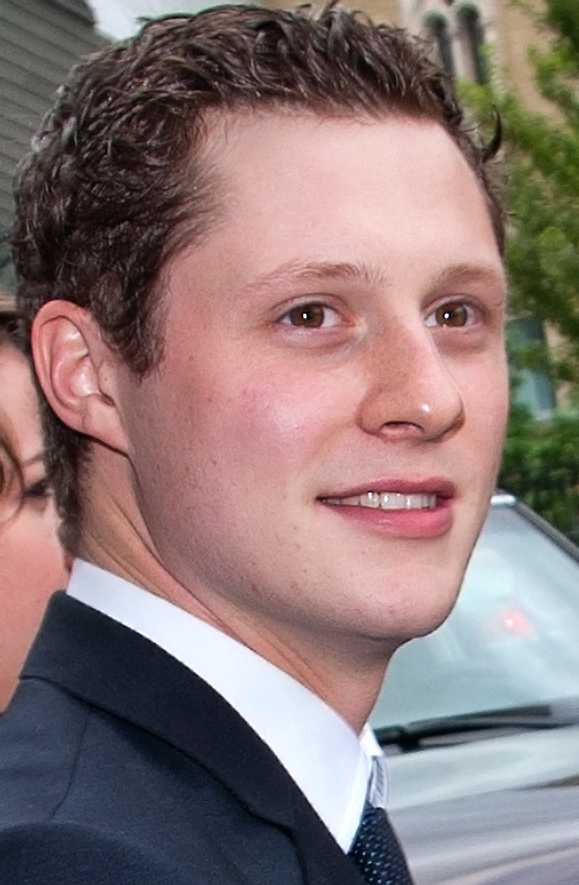
Noah Reid

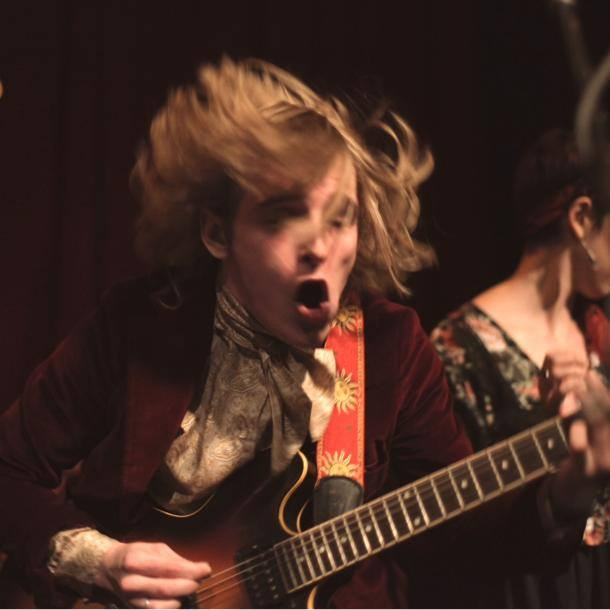
Shaun Fleming

- May 1
  - Evan Brown, soccer player
  - Glen Coffee, football player
  - Drew Fulk, songwriter and record producer
- May 2
  - Jeff Cumberland, football player
  - Pat McAfee, football player, sports analyst, and wrestling commentator
- May 4
  - Alex Boone, football player
  - Bryan Braman, football player (d. 2025)
- May 5
  - Eliot Bostar, politician
  - Cortney Casey, mixed martial artist
  - Ian Michael Smith, actor
- May 6
  - Teddy Abrams, conductor, pianist, clarinetist, and composer
  - Lani Forbes, author (d. 2022)
  - Peter Kaiser, dog musher
  - Meek Mill, rapper
- May 7
  - Aidy Bryant, actress and comedian
  - Russell Dickerson, country singer/songwriter
  - Maya Erskine, actress
- May 10
  - Eileen April Boylan, actress
  - Wilson Chandler, basketball player
- May 11
  - Lince Dorado, pro wrestler
  - Justin King, football player
  - Louis Murphy, football player
- May 12
  - Tyson Alualu, football player
  - Josh Bostic, basketball player
  - Weldon Brown, football player
  - Rafael Bush, football player
  - Clams Casino, record producer and songwriter
  - Lance Lynn, baseball player
  - Robbie Rogers, TV producer and soccer player
- May 13
  - Matt Doyle, actor
  - Misha Gabriel, dancer
  - Candice King, actress and singer/songwriter
  - Hunter Parrish, actor and singer
- May 15
  - David Adams, baseball player
  - Darry Beckwith, football player
  - Bruce G. Blowers, Christian singer/songwriter
  - Michael Brantley, baseball player
  - Brian Dozier, baseball player
- May 16
  - Spencer Adkins, football player
  - Mark Aguhar, LGBT rights activist, writer, and multimedia fine artist (d. 2012)
  - Tyler Cloyd, baseball player
  - Sharaud Curry, basketball player
- May 17 – Cash Wheeler, wrestler
- May 18
  - Chris Baumann, rugby player
  - Mondaire Jones, politician
  - Mike Williams, football player (d. 2023)
- May 19
  - Michael Angelakos, musician, singer/songwriter, and record producer
  - David Caldwell, football player
  - Kristi Cirone, basketball player and coach
  - Stacey Park Milbern, South Korean-born disability rights activist (d. 2020)
- May 20
  - Ray Chase, voice actor
  - Eric Crocker, football player
  - Julian Wright, basketball player
- May 21
  - Matt Bischoff, baseball player
  - Brent Bowden, football player
  - Cody Johnson, country singer/songwriter
- May 22
  - Jack Carlson, author, designer, and rowing coxswain
  - Jaye Chapman, baseball player
- May 23
  - Bray Wyatt, wrestler (d. 2023)
- May 24 – Marline Barberena, American-born Nicaraguan beauty pageant titleholder, Miss Nicaragua 2014
- May 25 – Kirk Carlsen, cyclist
- May 26
  - Tim Bowman Jr., gospel musician
  - Crezdon Butler, football player
  - Brandi Cyrus, actress, singer and DJ
- May 27
  - Bas, rapper
  - Michael Bramos, basketball player
  - Benny Johnson, political columnist and YouTuber
- May 28 – Jessica Rothe, actress
- May 29
  - Avery Atkins, football player (d. 2007)
  - Joey Haro, actor
  - Alessandra Torresani, actress
  - Noah Reid, Canadian-born actor and musician
- May 30
  - Javicia Leslie, actress
  - Brianna Taylor, television personality and singer/songwriter
- May 31
  - Shaun Fleming, actor and musician
  - Meredith Hagner, actress

=== June ===
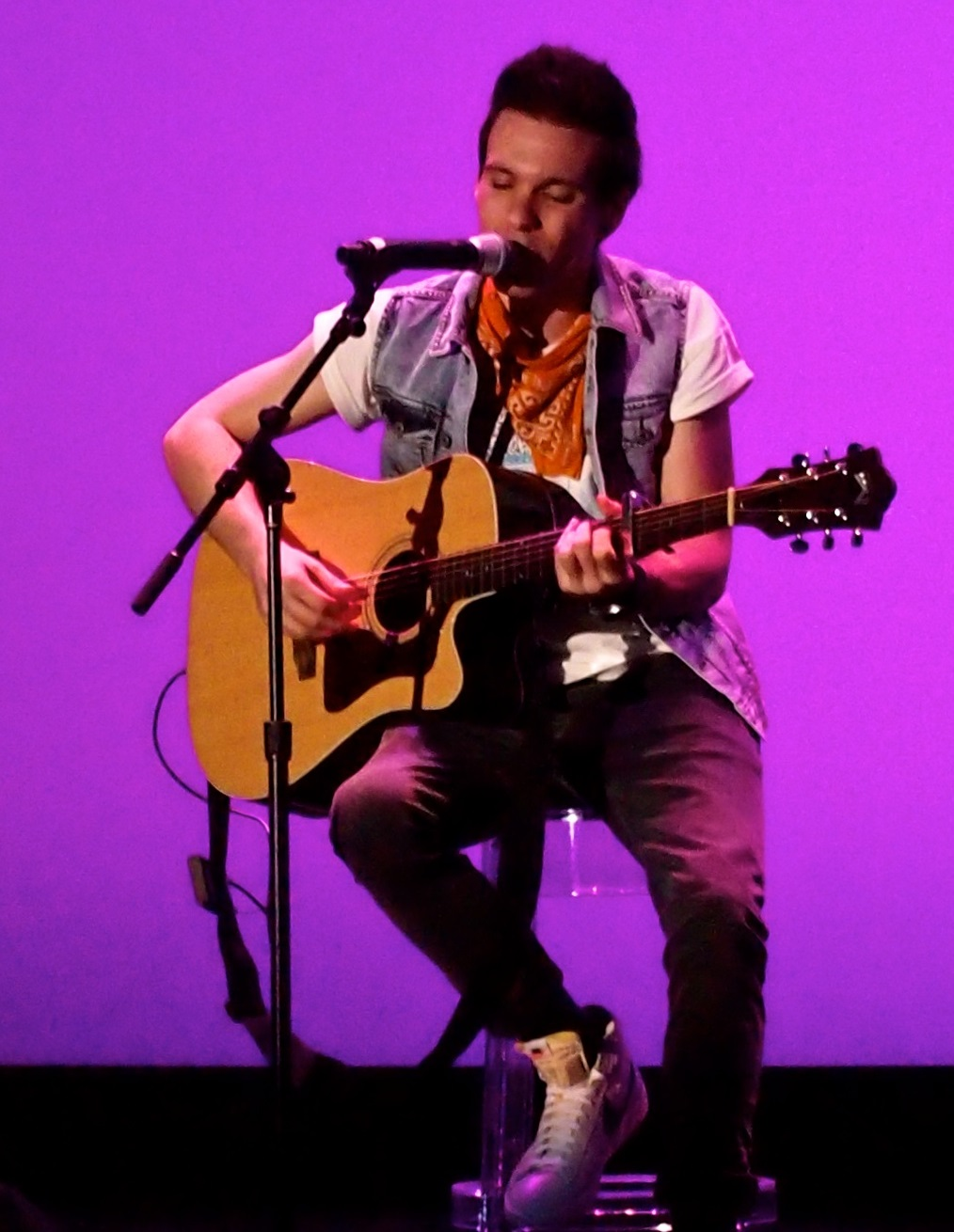
Matthew Koma

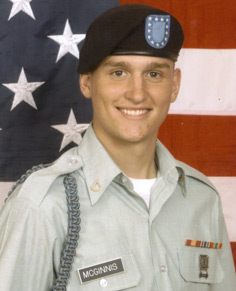
Ross A. McGinnis

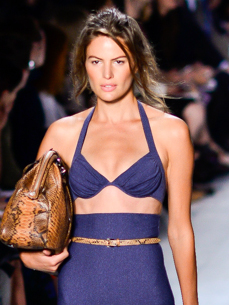
Cameron Russell

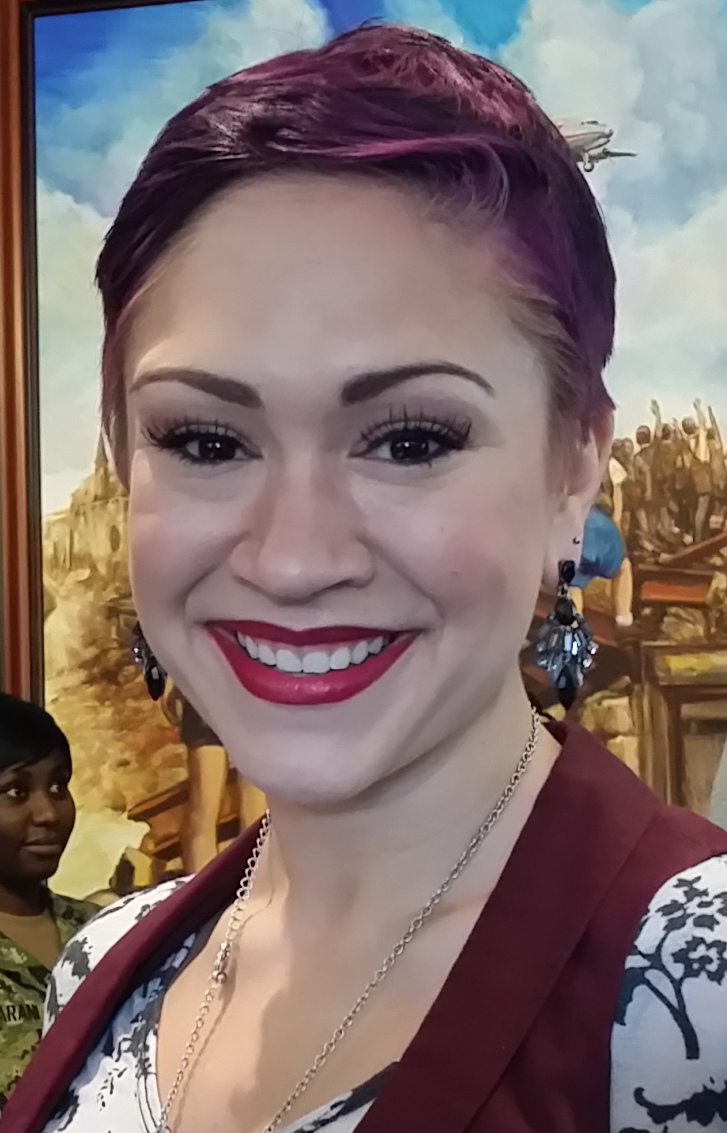
Diana DeGarmo

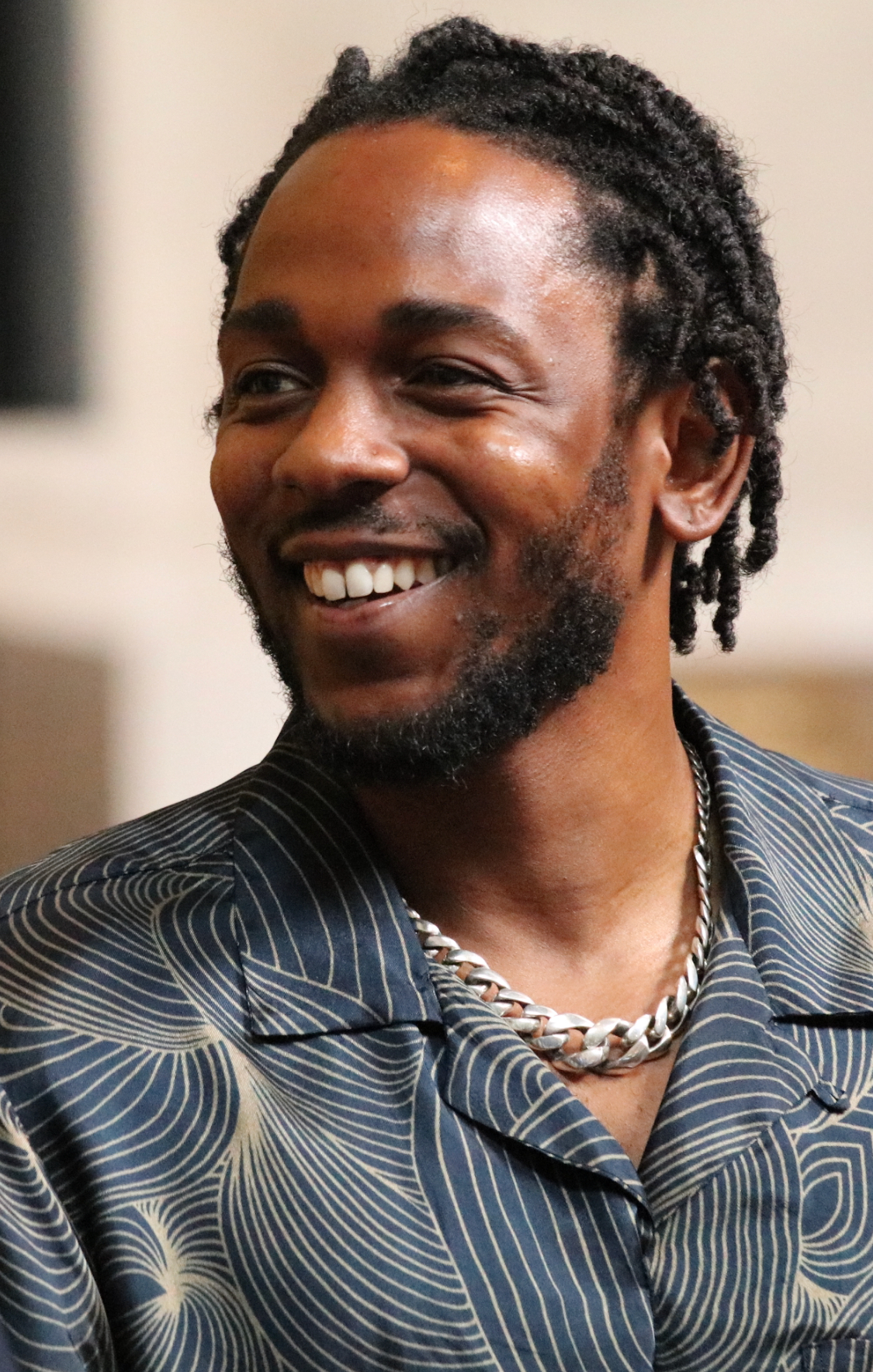
Kendrick Lamar

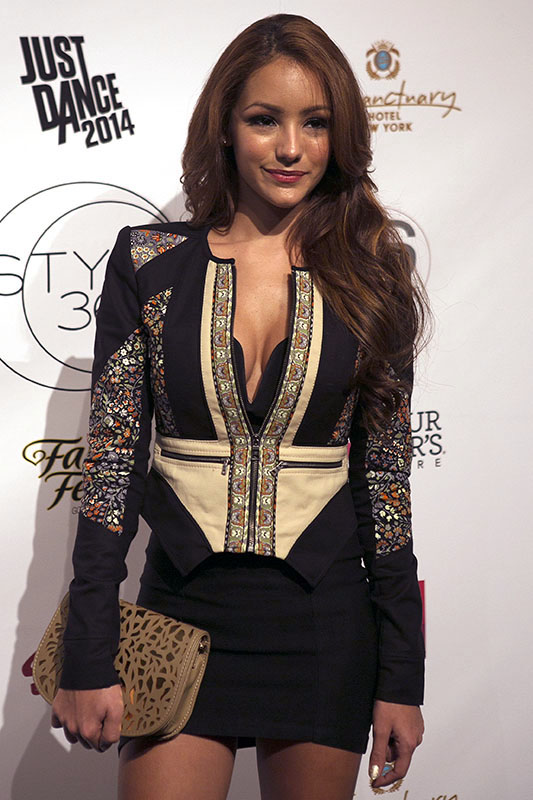
Melanie Iglesias

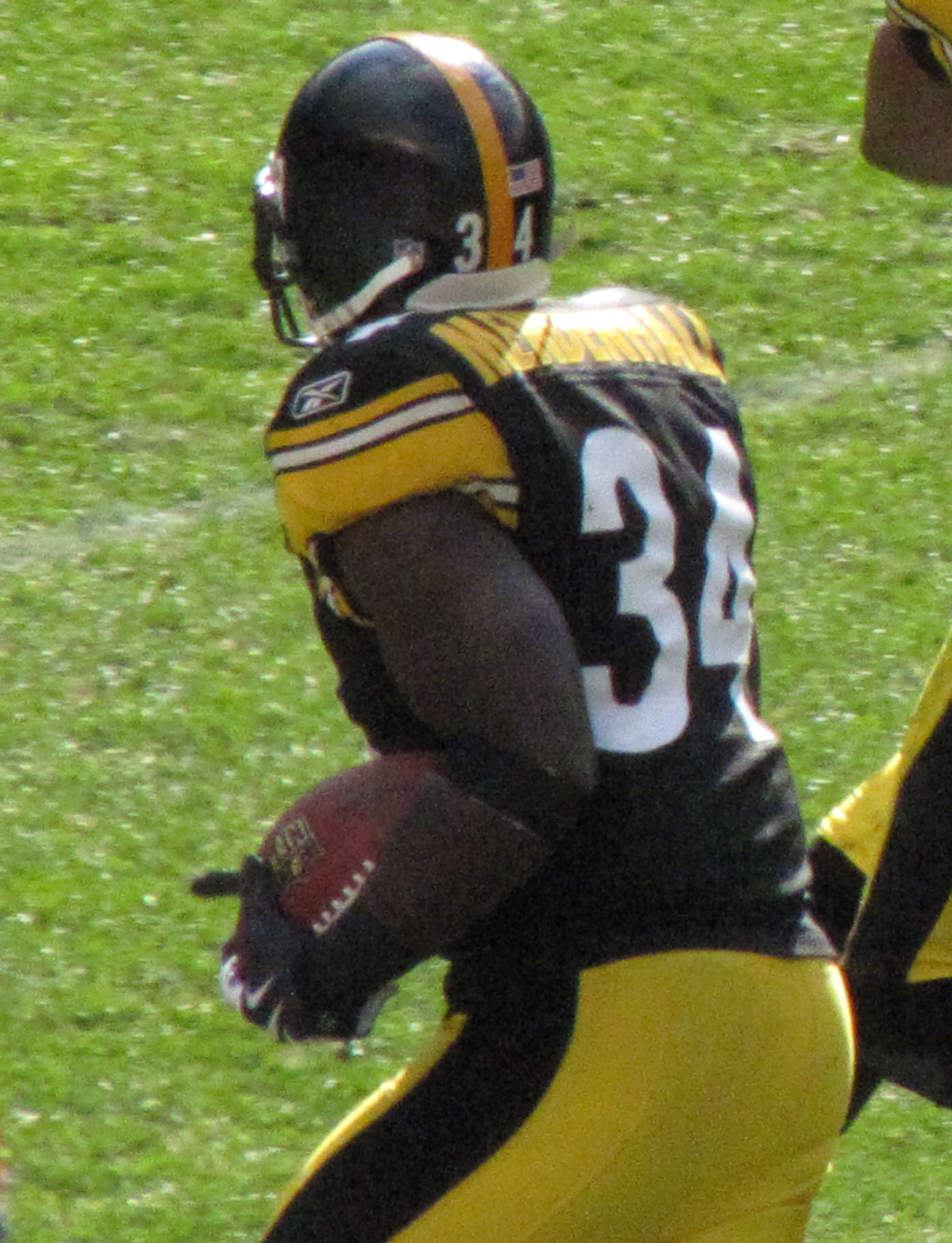
Rashard Mendenhall

- June 1
  - Bonner Bolton, model and bull rider
  - Jerel McNeal, Professional Basketball Player
- June 2
  - Jonathan Borrajo, soccer player
  - Bronson Burgoon, golfer
  - Lee J. Carter, politician
  - Paul Carter, basketball player
  - Matthew Koma, singer/songwriter, DJ and record producer
  - Caitlin Mallory, American-born Estonian ice dancer
- June 3
  - Jonathan Casillas, football player
  - Lalaine, actress, singer/songwriter, and bassist
- June 4
  - Miles Batty, middle-distance runner
  - Tori Praver, model and swimwear designer
- June 7 – Cassius Chaney, boxer
- June 8
  - Terry M. Brown Jr., politician
  - John Conner, football player
- June 9
  - JB Baretsky, singer/songwriter
  - Austin Bisnow, musician, songwriter, record producer, and frontman for Magic Giant
  - Robbie Fairchild, actor and ballet dancer
  - Rheagan Wallace, actress
- June 10
  - Lyssa Chapman, businesswoman, television personality, bail bondswoman, and bounty hunter
  - Jeremy Chappell, basketball player
- June 11 – Nichole Cheza, dirt track motorcycle racer
- June 12
  - Seyi Ajirotutu, football player
  - Jeff Allen, basketball player
  - Luke Humphrey, American-born Canadian actor
- June 13
  - E. J. Biggers, football player
  - John Bryant, basketball player
  - Arielle Charnas, fashion blogger and influencer
  - Franchón Crews-Dezurn, boxer
  - Leone Cruz, soccer player
- June 14
  - Anthony Clark, cyclo-cross cyclist
  - Chris Carter, football player
  - Ross A. McGinnis, U.S. Army Veteran in the Iraq War and Medal of Honor Recipient (d. 2006)
  - Cameron Russell, model
- June 15 – Van Ferro, actor
- June 16
  - Kelly Blatz, actor and singer
  - Wayne Chism, American-born Bahraini basketball player
  - Diana DeGarmo, singer and Broadway actress
  - Abby Elliott, actress and comedian
- June 17 – Kendrick Lamar, rapper
- June 18
  - Jeremy Bleich, American-born Israeli baseball player
  - Jason Castro, baseball player
  - Brandon Cutler, wrestler
  - O.T. Genasis, rapper, actor, and singer
  - Melanie Iglesias, model and actress
- June 19
  - Fabiola Arias, Cuban-born fashion designer
  - Mikail Baker, football player
  - Alex Carrington, football player
  - Keenan Clayton, football player
  - Rashard Mendenhall, football player
- June 21
  - Oliver Baez Bendorf, poet and writer
  - Kyle Calloway, football player (d. 2016)
  - Pat Harrigan, politician
- June 22
  - Nathan Bauman, entertainment consultant and drummer
  - Jerrod Carmichael, stand-Up comedian, actor and writer
  - Delone Carter, football player
- June 23
  - Quinton Andrews, football player
  - Haley Strode, actress
- June 24
  - Ronnie Aguilar, basketball player
  - Duane Brooks, football player
  - Mozzy, rapper
- June 25
  - Maurice Acker, basketball player
  - J'Nathan Bullock, basketball player
  - Brian Canter, bull rider
  - Alissa Czisny, figure skater
  - Mark Titus, author and pod-caster
  - Scott Terra, actor
- June 26
  - Alric Arnett, football player
  - Zoraida Córdova, Ecuadorian-born author
  - Russell Currier, Olympic biathlete
  - Mike Macdonald, football coach
- June 28 – Brandon Brooks, basketball player
- June 29
  - Les Brown, football player
  - Lewis Clinch, basketball player
- June 30 – Ryan Cook, baseball player

=== July ===
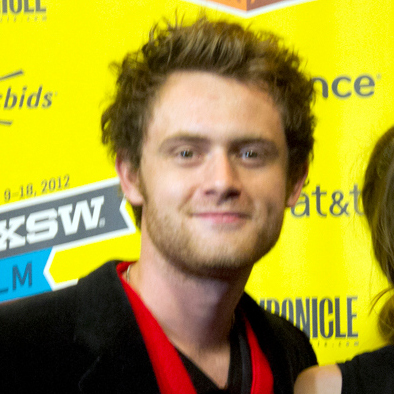
Matt O'Leary

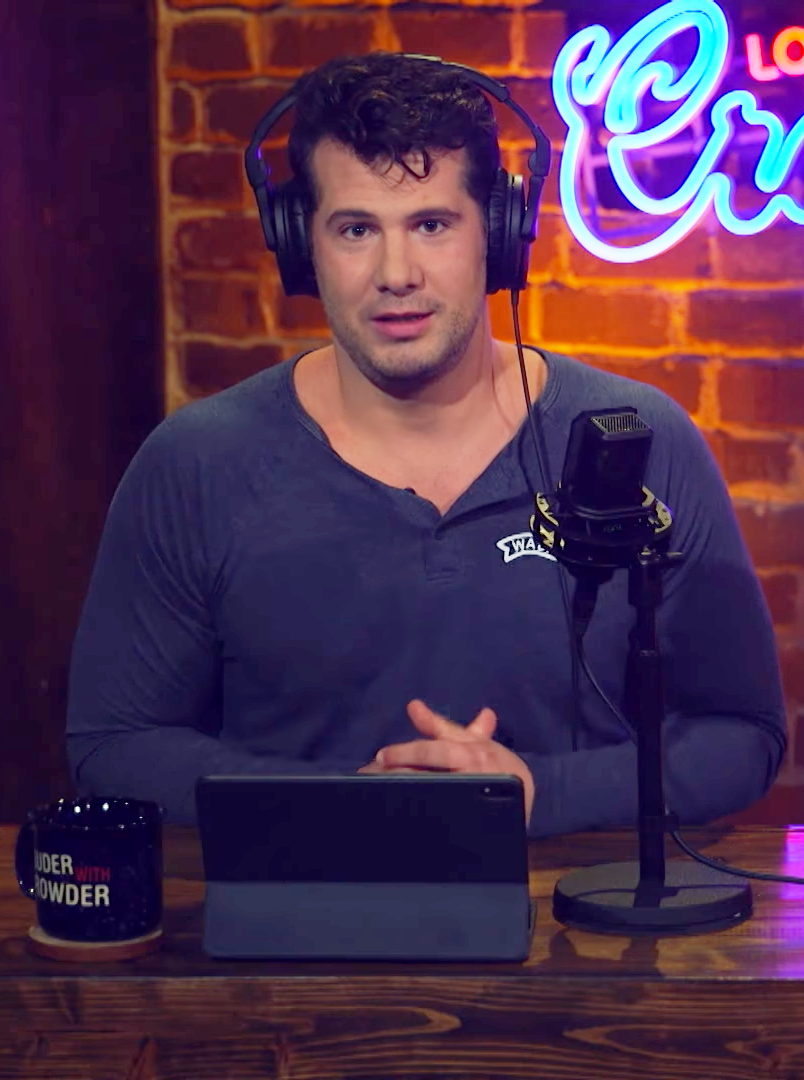
Steven Crowder

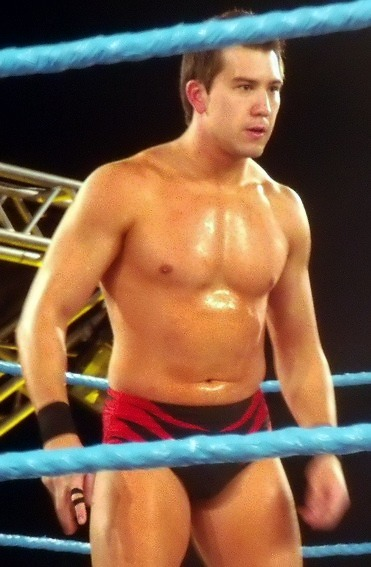
Richie Steamboat

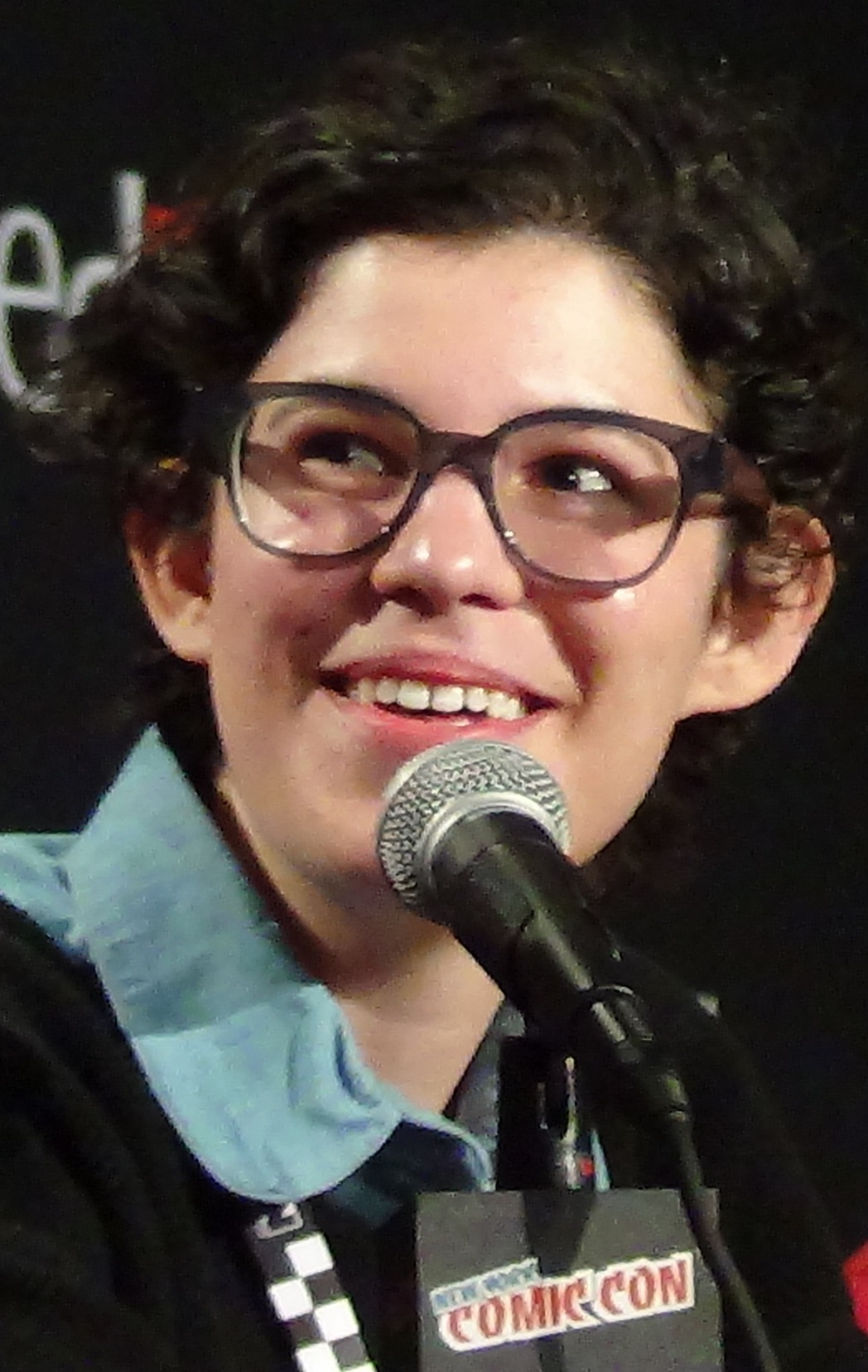
Rebecca Sugar

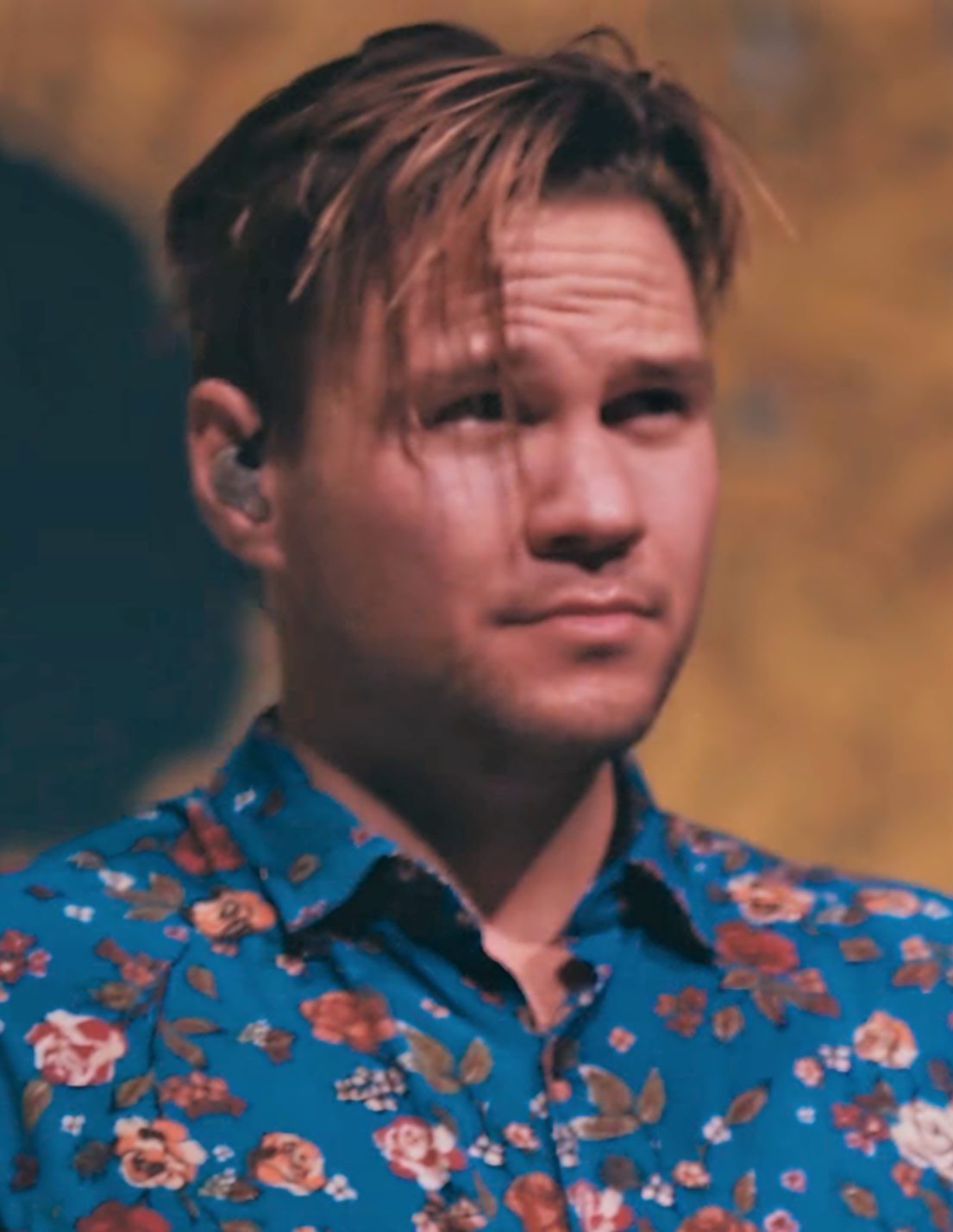
Tilian Pearson

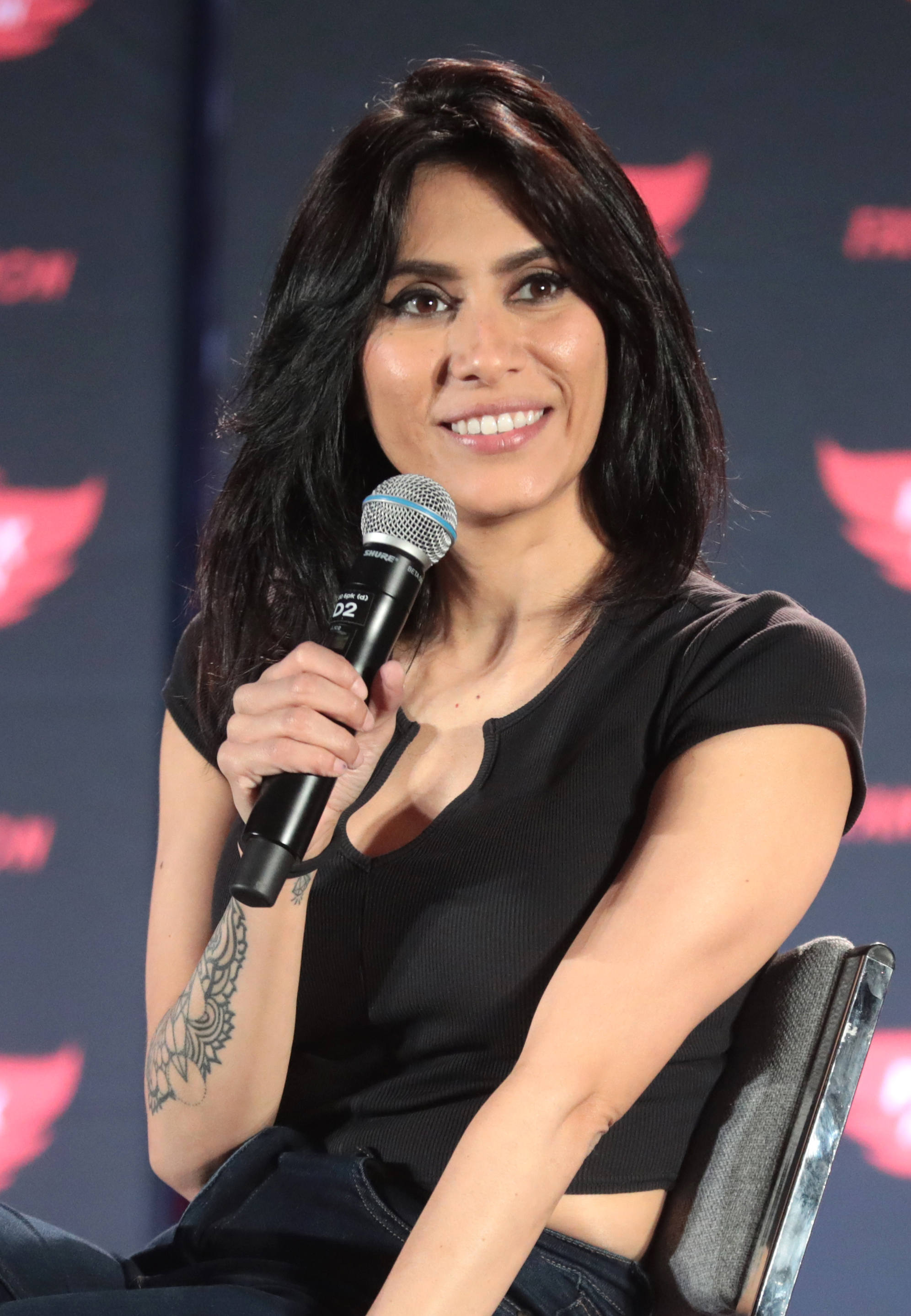
Cristina Vee

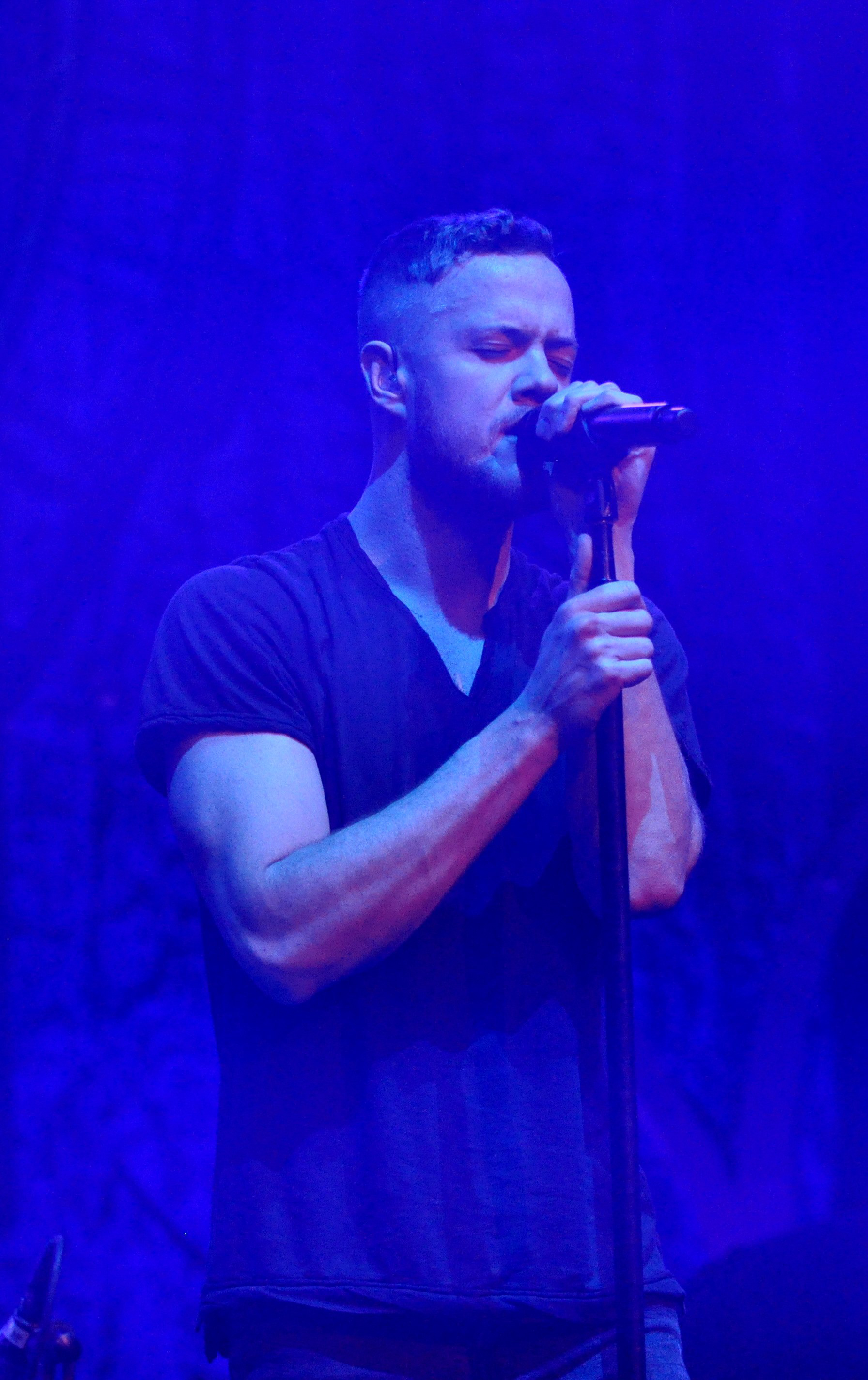
Dan Reynolds

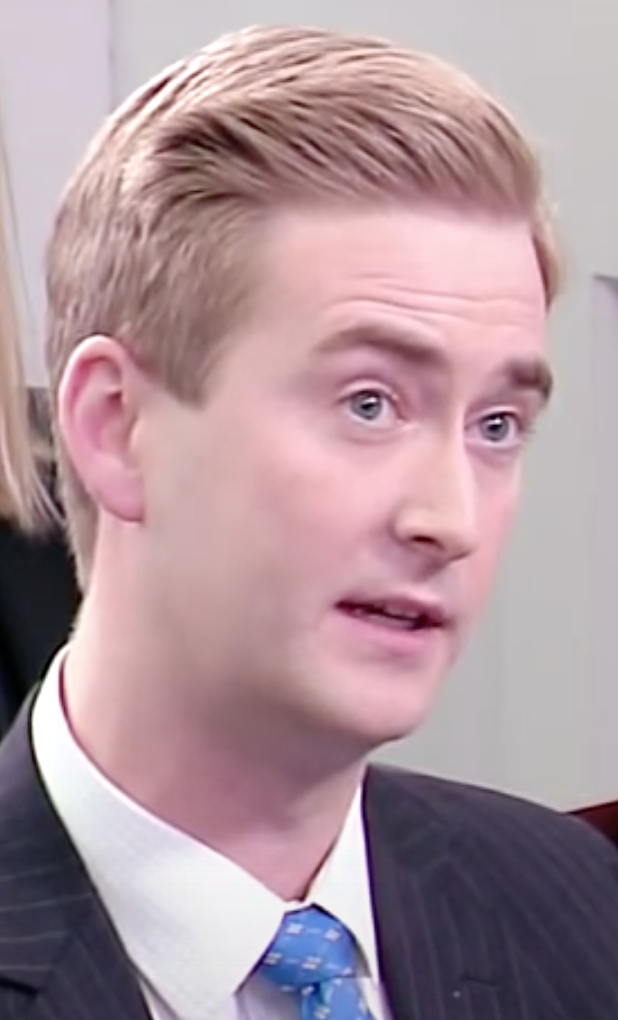
Peter Doocy

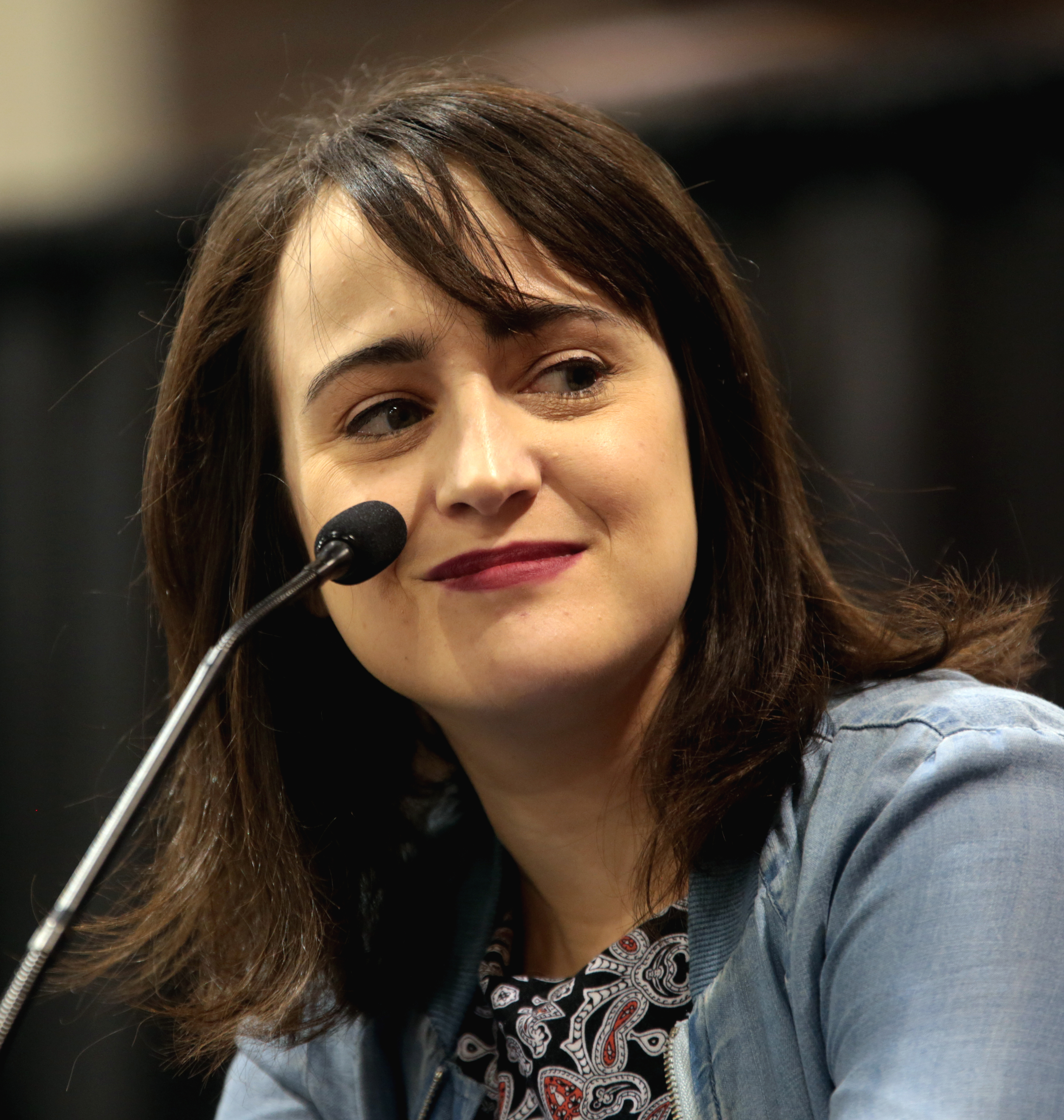
Mara Wilson

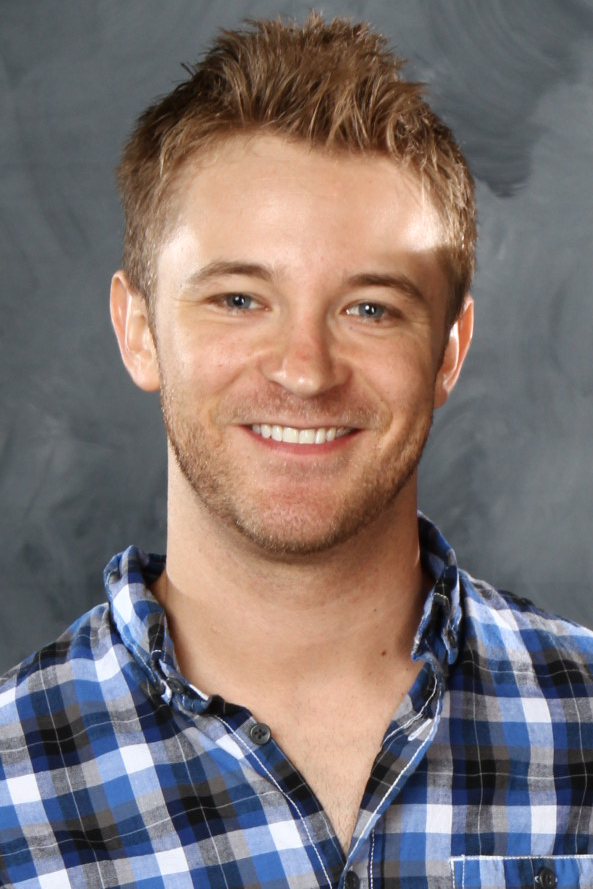
Michael Welch

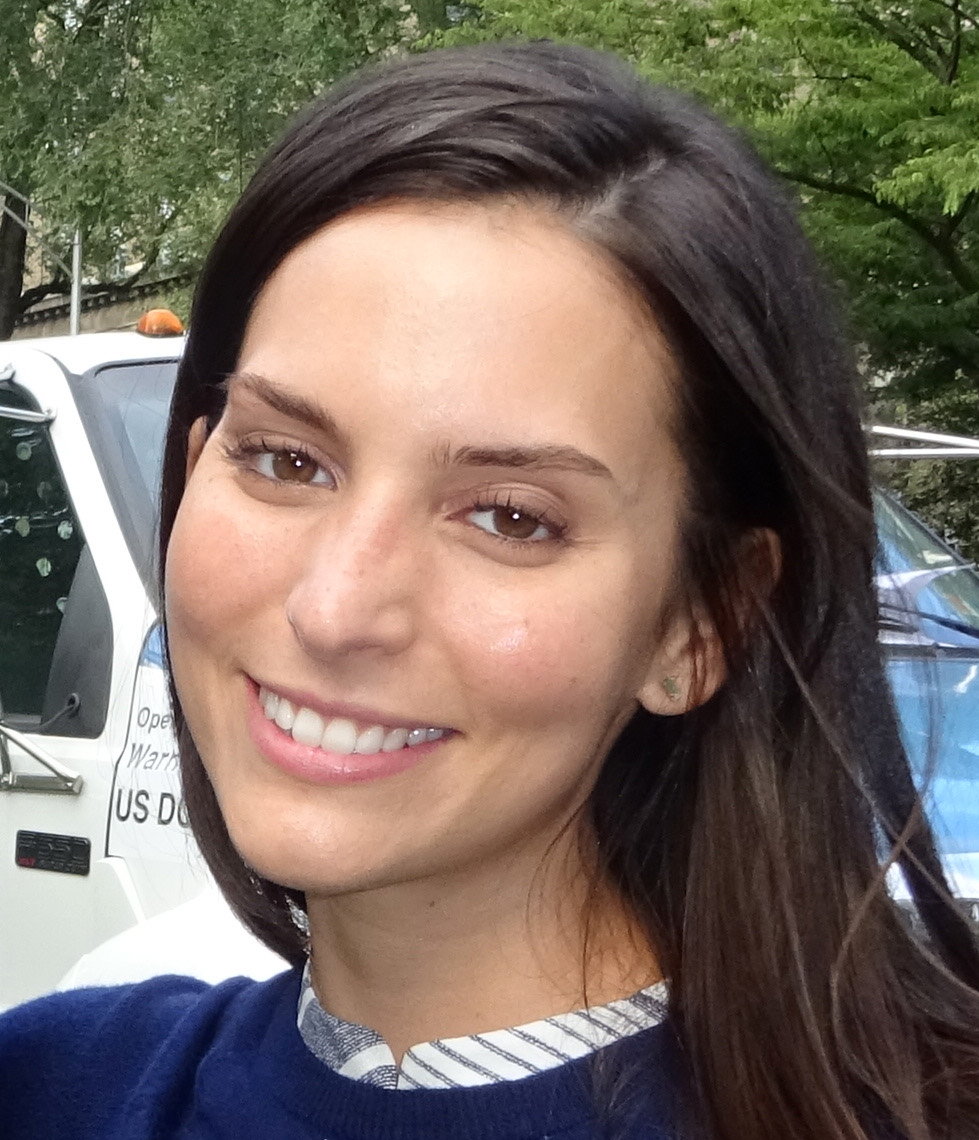
Genesis Rodriguez

- July 1
  - Kevin Alexander, football player
  - Zeda Zhang, wrestler and mixed martial artist
- July 2
  - Dan Black, baseball player
  - Brett Cooper, mixed martial artist
- July 3
  - Will Barker, football player
  - Chad Broskey, actor
  - Casey Coleman, baseball player
  - Chris Hunter, actor
- July 5 – Erik Cook, football player
- July 6
  - Sophie Auster, singer/songwriter
  - Matt O'Leary, actor
- July 7
  - Alysha Clark, American-born Israeli basketball player
  - Colin Cochart, football player
  - Steven Crowder, American-born Canadian conservative political commentator, comedian, and YouTuber
  - Julianna Guill, actress
  - Fidel Corrales Jimenez, Cuban-born chess grandmaster
  - Richie Steamboat, wrestler
- July 9
  - Anna Mima, Japanese-born singer
  - Ashlee Evans-Smith, mixed martial artist
  - Rebecca Sugar, animator and creator of Steven Universe
- July 10
  - Brian Jordan Alvarez, actor and filmmaker
  - Isaac Baron, poker player
  - Jermaine Curtis, baseball player
- July 11
  - Nicholas Alahverdian, child welfare activist and sex offender (d. 2026)
  - Phil Costa, football player
  - A.J. LoCascio, actor, voice actor, film director and producer
  - Cristina Vee, voice actress
- July 12
  - Dobson Collins, football player
  - Graig Cooper, football player
  - Tilian Pearson, singer/songwriter, musician, and frontman for Dance Gavin Dance (2013–present)
- July 13 – Cynthia Calvillo, mixed martial artist
- July 14
  - Charly Arnolt, sports broadcaster and television personality
  - Sarah Burgess, singer/songwriter and American Idol contestant
  - Drew Fortier, musician, songwriter, filmmaker and actor
  - Dan Reynolds, singer and musician
- July 15
  - Nikki Bohne, singer, actress, and dancer
  - Kevin Croom, mixed martial artist
  - Alex Lasry, businessman and co-owner of the Milwaukee Bucks
- July 16
  - Will Acton, American-born Canadian ice hockey player
  - Kate Berlant, comedian, actress, and writer
  - Kira Buckland, voice actress
  - Catherine Charlebois, actress
  - AnnaLynne McCord, actress and model
- July 17
  - Stevie Brown, football player
  - Jorrick Calvin, football player
  - Meghan Camarena, YouTuber and internet personality
  - McKenzie Cantrell, politician
  - Eric Carpenter, soccer player
  - Jaime Chavez, soccer player
  - Nick Christiani, baseball player
- July 19
  - Jon Jones, mixed martial artist
- July 21
  - Jen Corey, beauty pageant titleholder, event planner, and community activist
  - Carla Cortijo, basketball player
  - Brandon Costner, basketball player
  - Kami Craig, Olympic water polo player
  - Peter Doocy, journalist
- July 22 – Bre-Z, actress and rapper
- July 23
  - David Bruton, football player
  - Chris Connolly, ice hockey player
- July 24
  - Matt Asiata, football player
  - Jovan Belcher, football player (d. 2012)
  - Tiffany Cabán, politician
  - Mattie Montgomery, singer/songwriter and frontman of For Today
  - Mara Wilson, actress and writer
- July 25
  - Richard Bachman, ice hockey player
  - Heather Bratton, fashion model (d. 2006)
  - Jonathan Crompton, football player
  - Mike Kafka, football player and coach
  - Michael Welch, actor
- Jule 26
  - 03 Greedo, rapper, singer/songwriter, and producer
  - Elise Addis, soccer player
  - Alex Burnett, baseball player
- July 28
  - Abbey Curran, beauty pageant contestant
  - Asher Grodman, actor
  - John Stevens, singer
- July 29
  - Victor Butler, football player
  - Sabra Johnson, dancer
  - Genesis Rodriguez, actress and model
- July 30 – Brandon Caleb, football player
- July 31
  - Colin Baxter, football player
  - Michael Bradley, soccer player

=== August ===
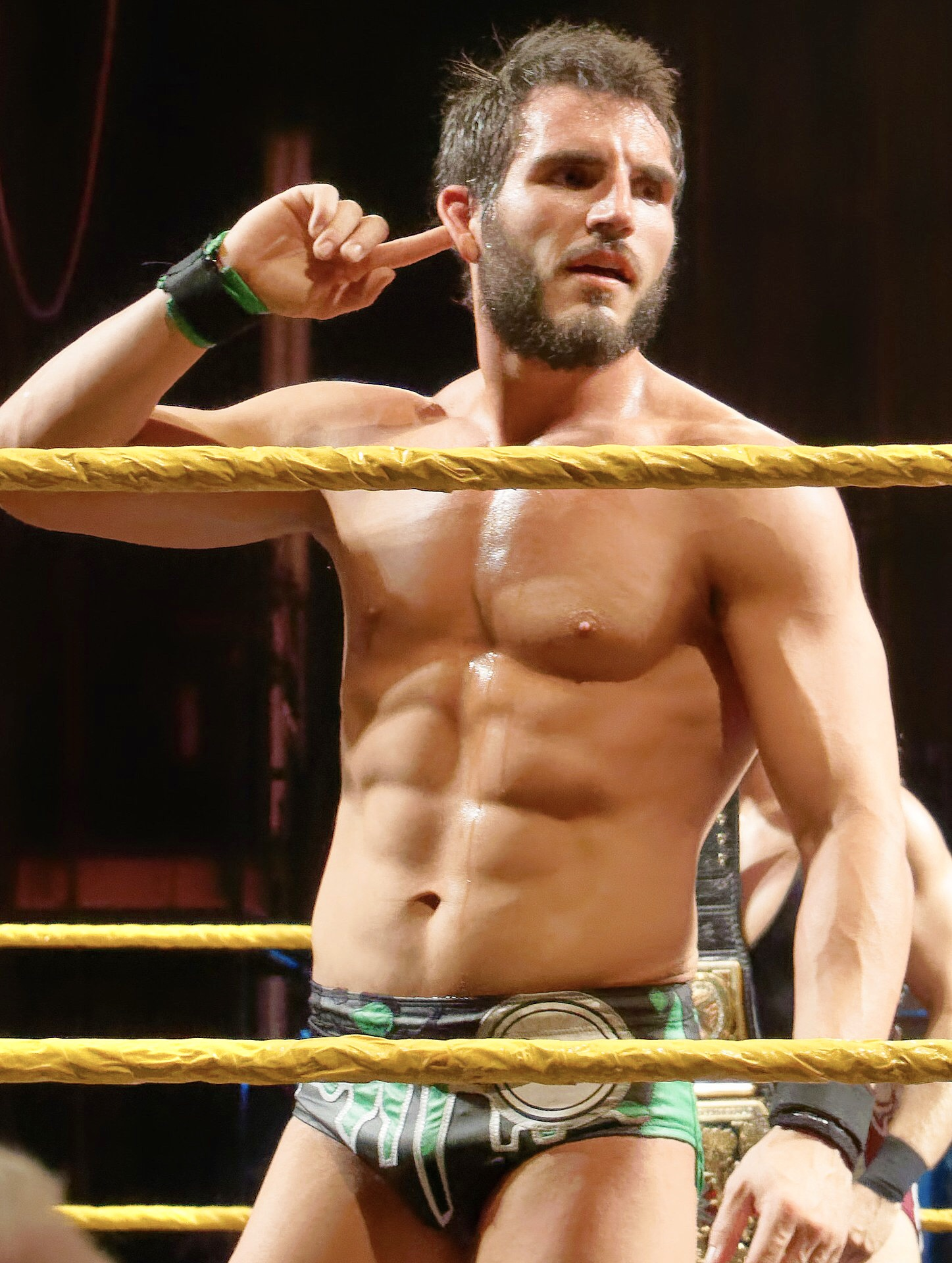
Johnny Gargano

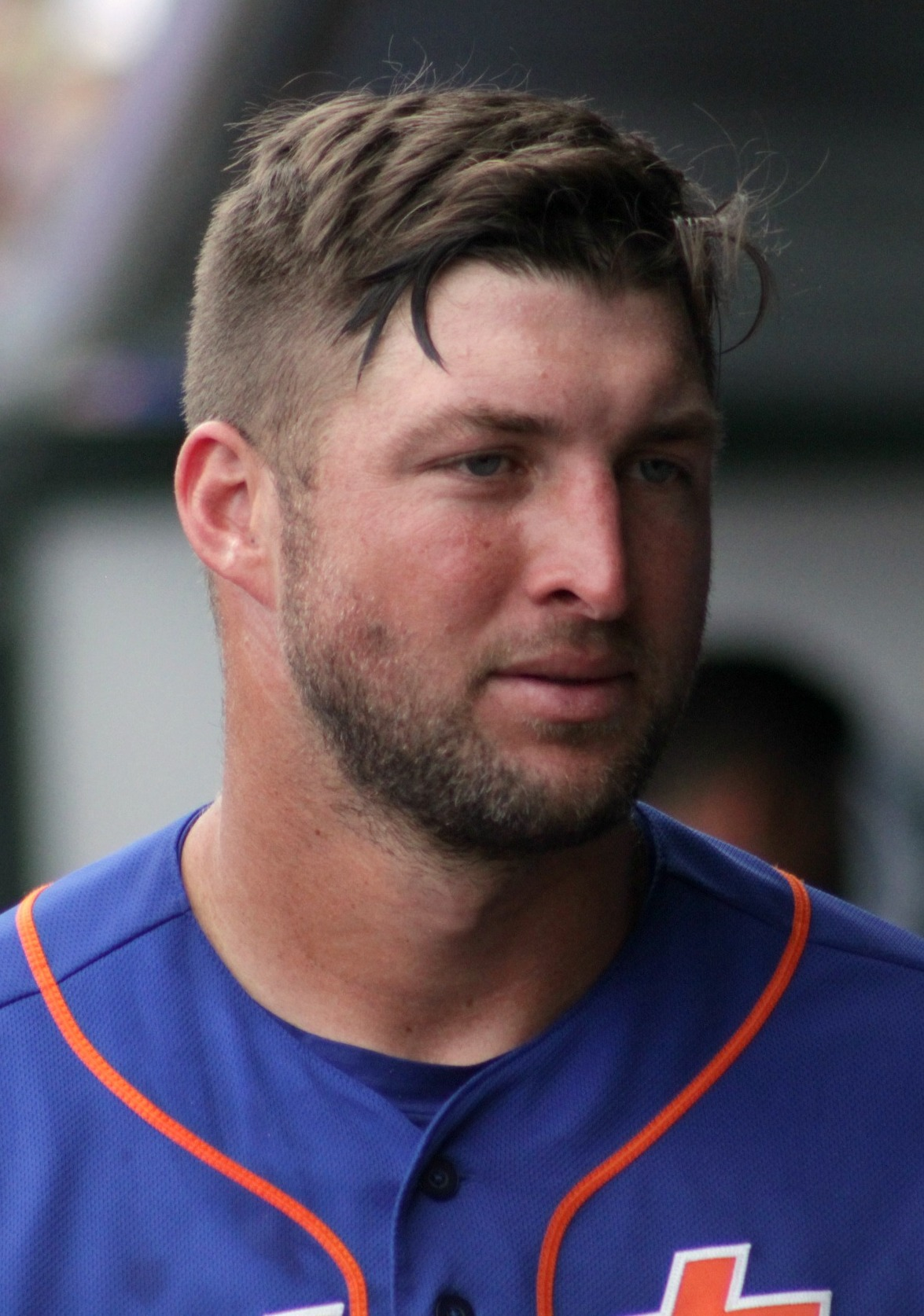
Tim Tebow

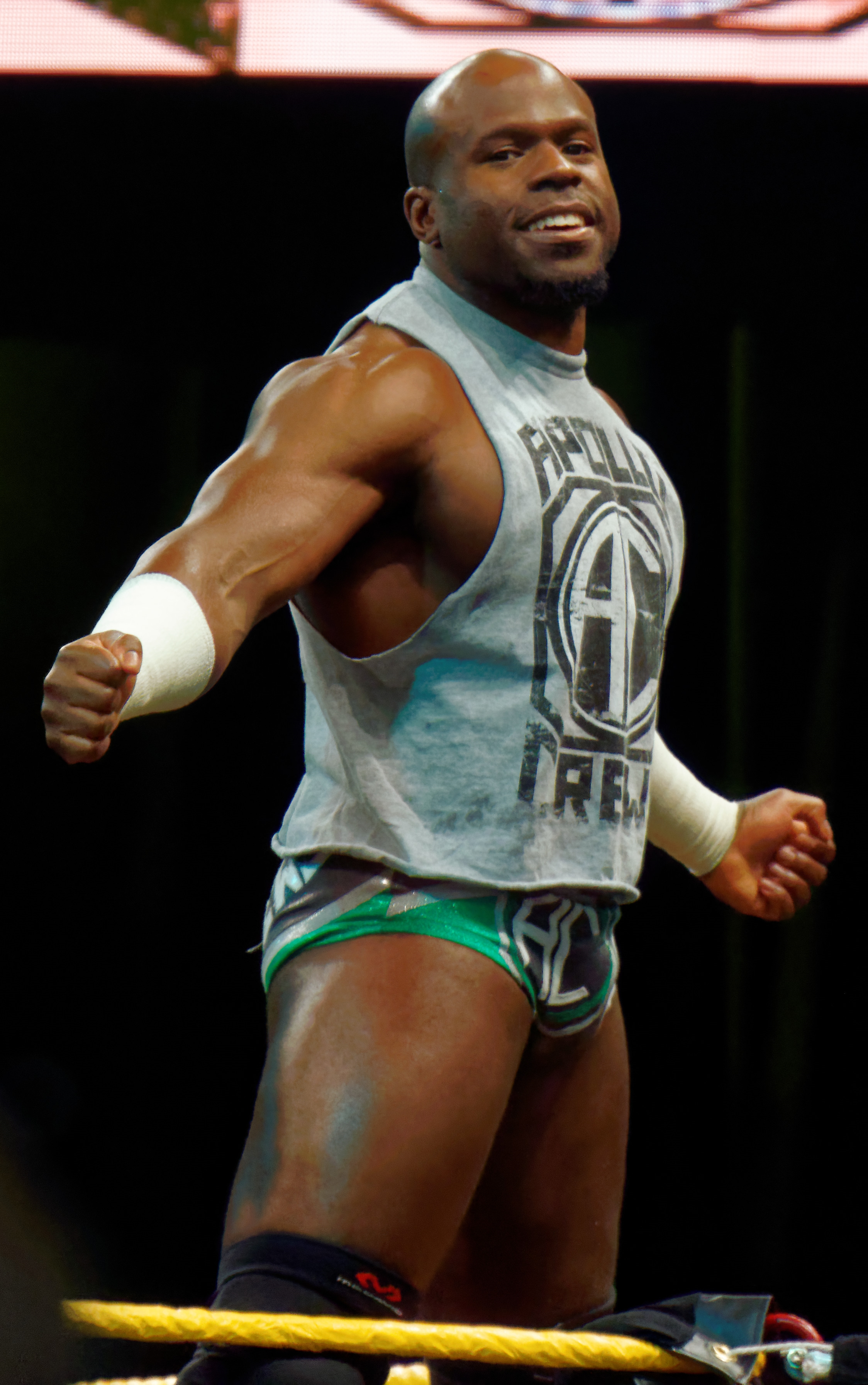
Apollo Crews

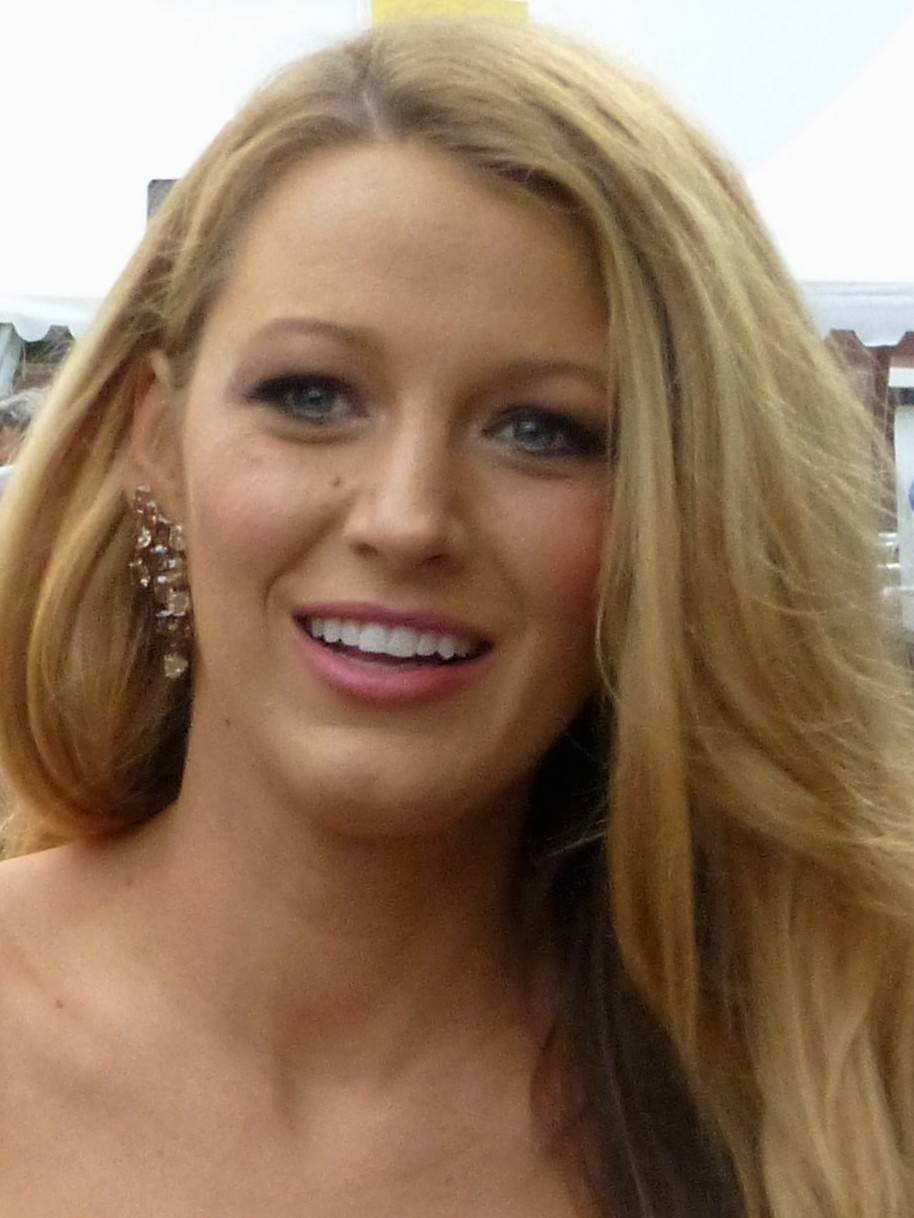
Blake Lively

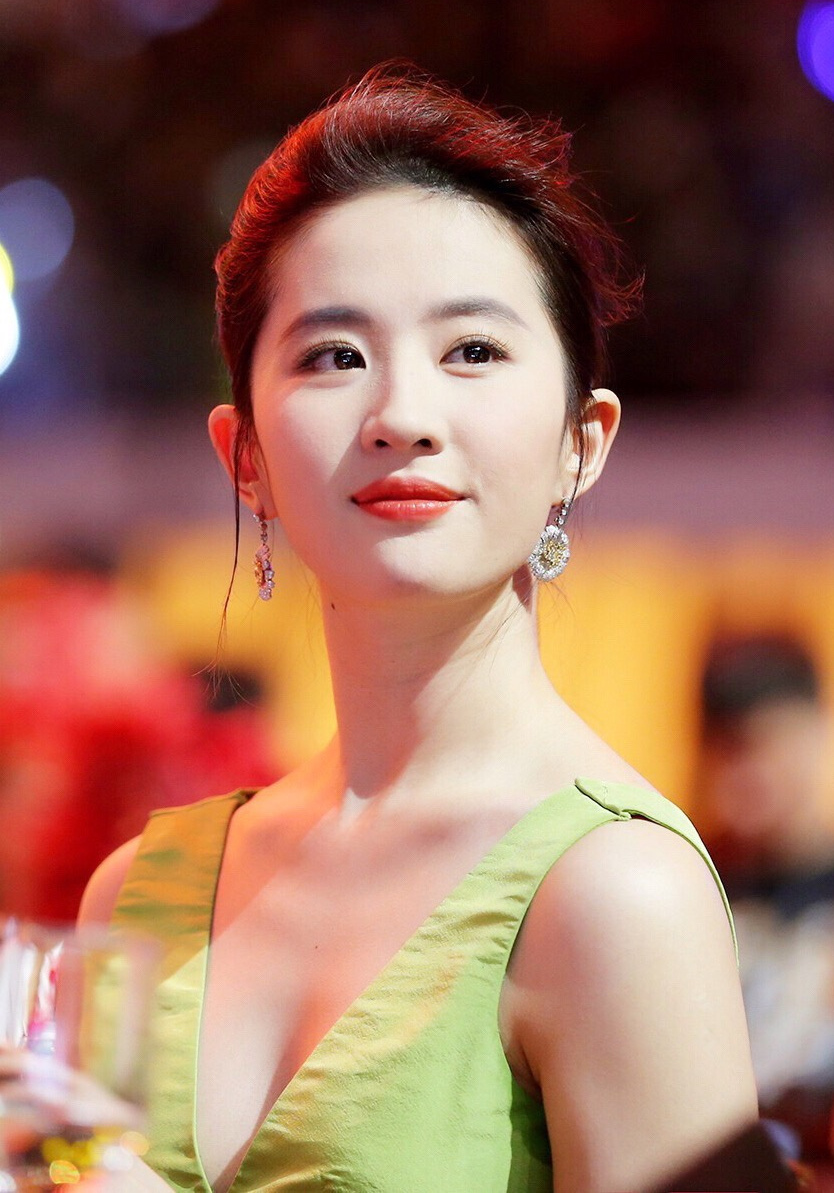
Liu Yifei

- August 2
  - Ashley Cummins, mixed martial artist
  - Nayer, pop singer
- August 4
  - Jackie Aina, beauty vlogger
  - Antonio Bass, football player
  - Nadia Bulkin, Indonesian-born political scientist
  - Caressa Cameron, beauty pageant titleholder and singer
- August 5
  - R. J. Archer, football player
  - Tim Federowicz, baseball player
- August 7
  - Everette Brown, football player and coach
  - Michael Sauer, ice hockey player
- August 9 – Jabari Brisport, politician
- August 10
  - Charles Clark, sprinter
  - TJ Curry, taekwondo practitioner
- August 13
  - Andre Bellos, actor, singer, and dancer
  - Lady Cam, rapper
  - Lena Chen, feminist artist, writer, and activist
  - Katy Crawford, Christian musician
  - Chris Plys, Olympic curler
- August 14
  - Sammy Adams, rapper and singer/songwriter
  - Montrell Craft, football player
  - Johnny Gargano, wrestler
  - Curt Hansen, actor
  - Colton Smith, mixed martial artist
  - Tim Tebow, football and baseball player
- August 15 – Ryan D'Imperio, football player
- August 16
  - Suzi Analogue, recording artist, musician, and songwriter
  - Dominique Curry, football player
  - Okieriete Onaodowan, actor and singer
- August 17 – Dominick Casola, stock car racing driver
- August 18
  - Mika Boorem, actress
  - Elizabeth Chambers, television personality
- August 19
  - Dominique Archie, basketball player
  - Jeremy Campbell, Paralympic pentathlete
  - Patrick Chung, football player
- August 21
  - DeWanna Bonner, basketball player
  - Annie Chandler, swimmer
  - Cody Kasch, actor
- August 22
  - Jim Cordle, football player
  - Apollo Crews, wrestler
- August 23
  - Zach Braddock, baseball player
  - Darren Collison, basketball player
- August 24 – Jon Scheyer, basketball player
- August 25
  - Jim Cook Jr., writer, actor, and filmmaker
  - Katie Hill, politician
  - Blake Lively, actress
  - Liu Yifei, Chinese-born actress
  - Justin Upton, baseball player
- August 26 – Ryan Brasier, baseball player
- August 27
  - Brett Bochy, baseball player
  - Tiffany Boone, actress
- August 28 – David Carr, politician
- August 29
  - Conor Chinn, soccer player
  - Max Cream, soccer player
- August 30
  - Johanna Braddy, actress
- August 31
  - Stephen Cardullo, baseball player
  - Pat Curran, mixed martial artist

=== September ===
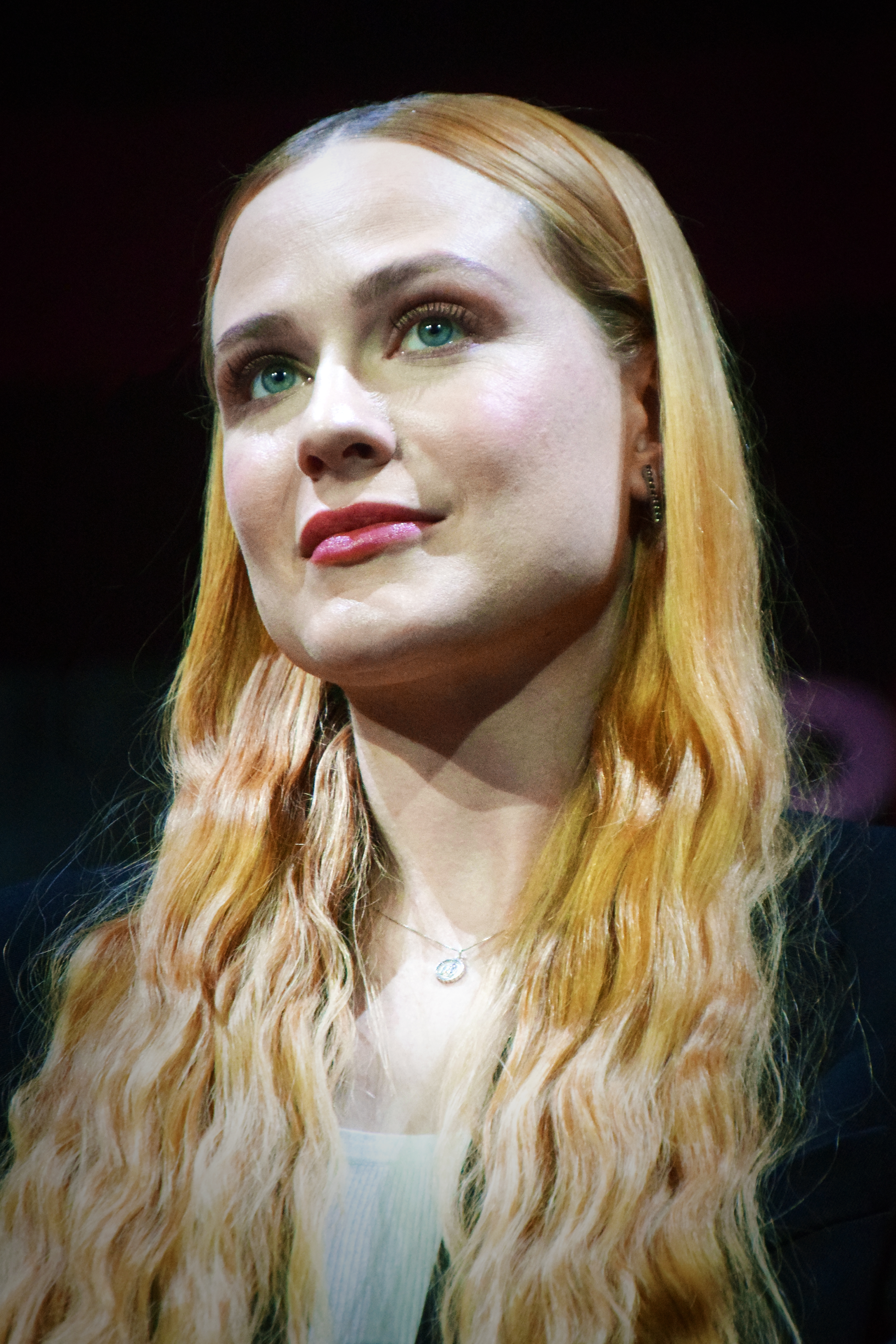
Evan Rachel Wood

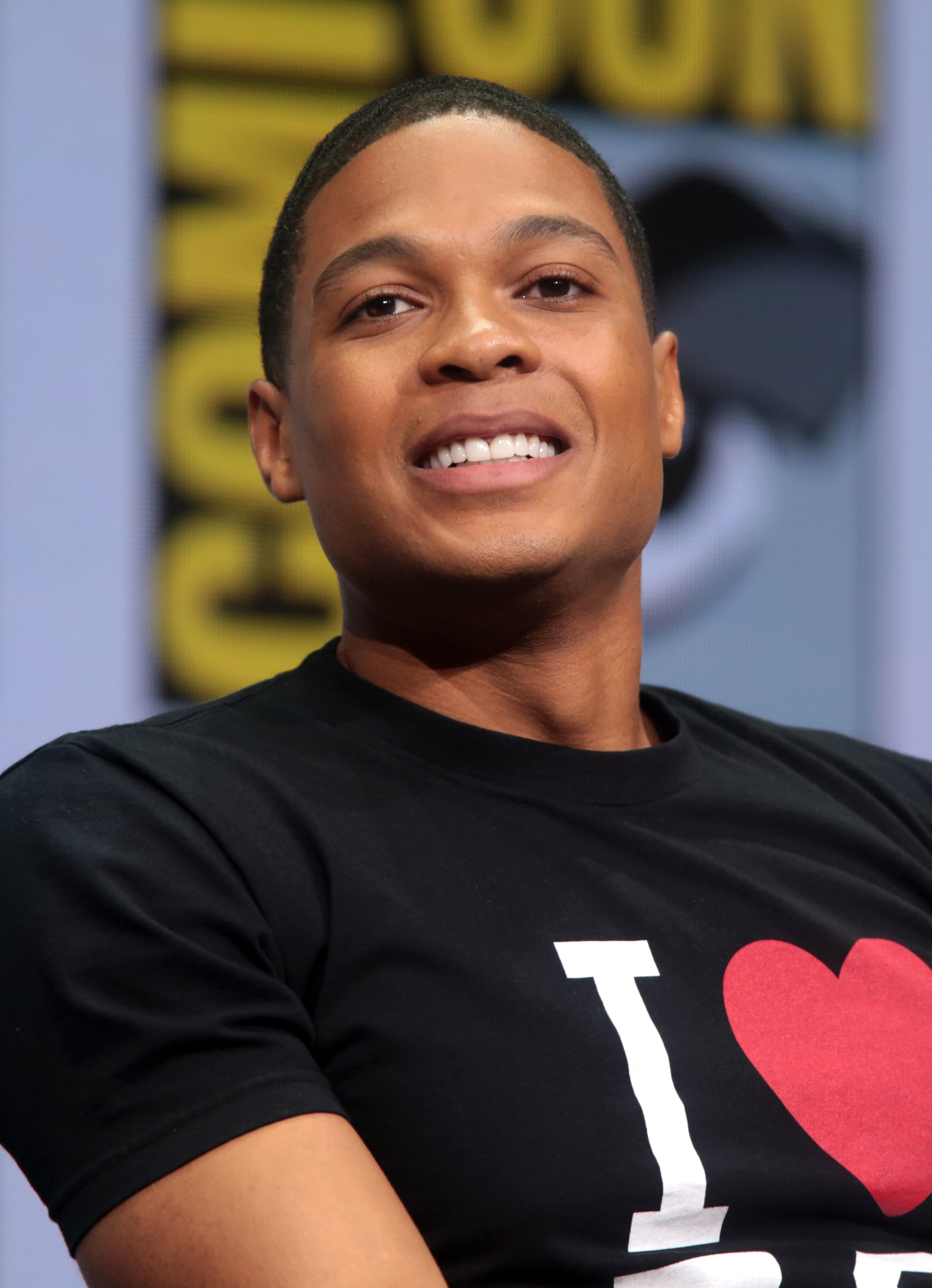
Ray Fisher

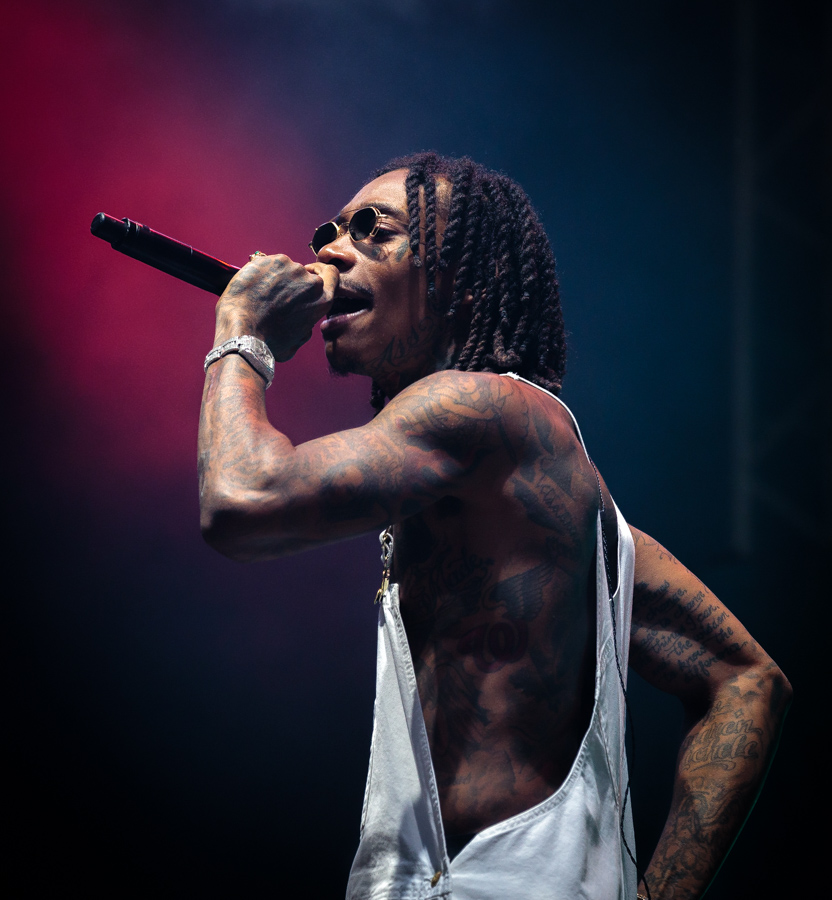
Wiz Khalifa

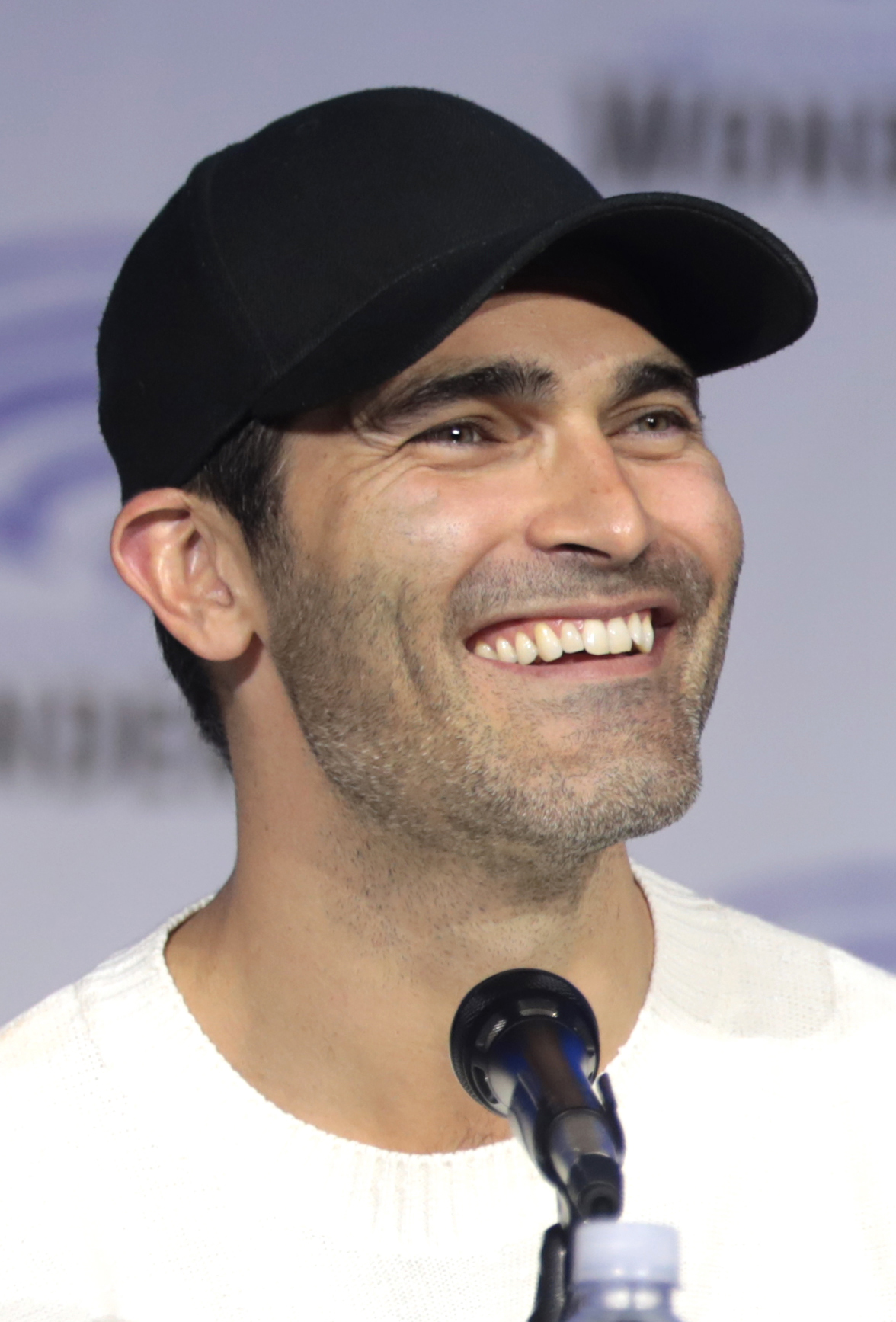
Tyler Hoechlin

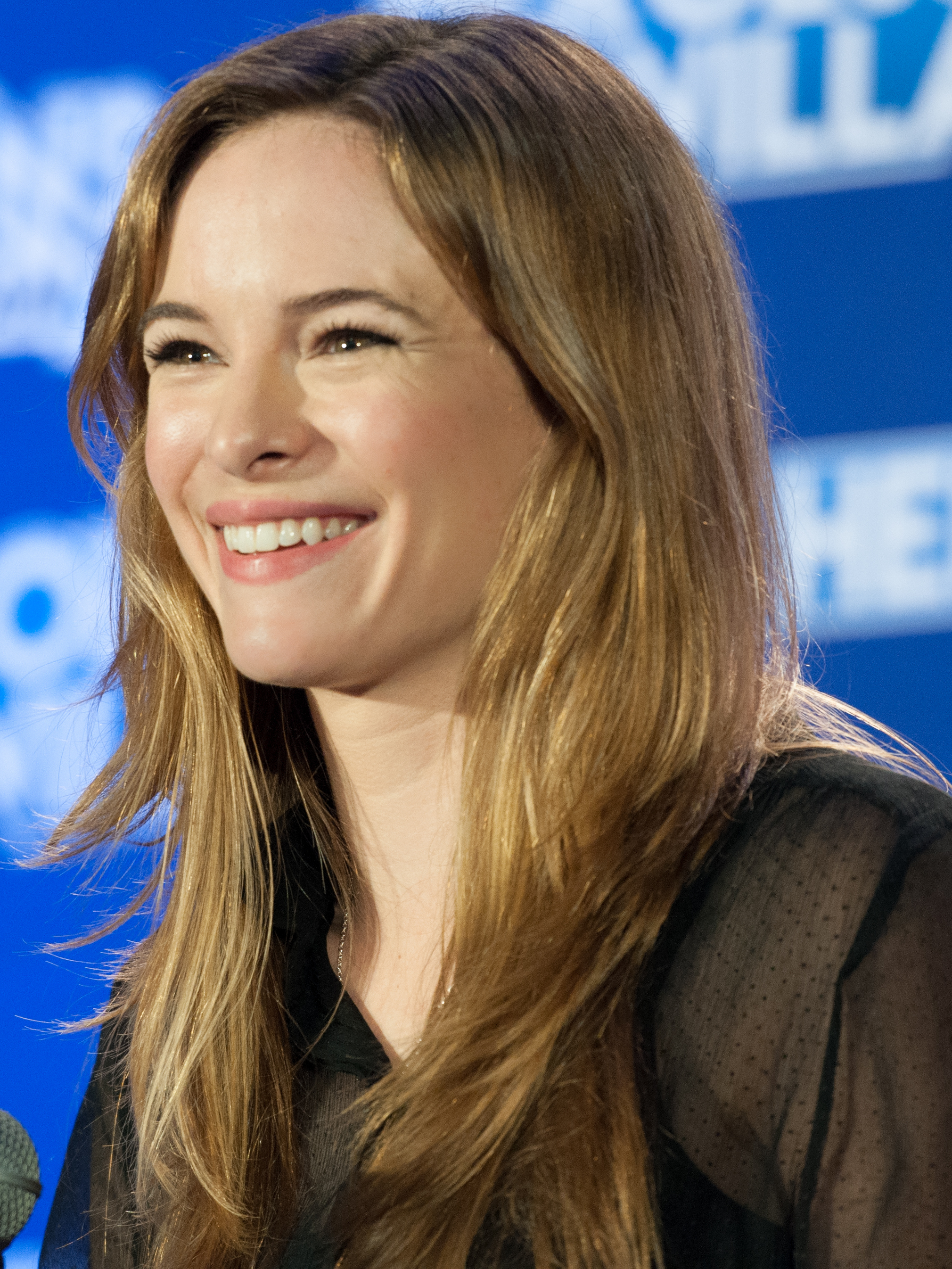
Danielle Panabaker

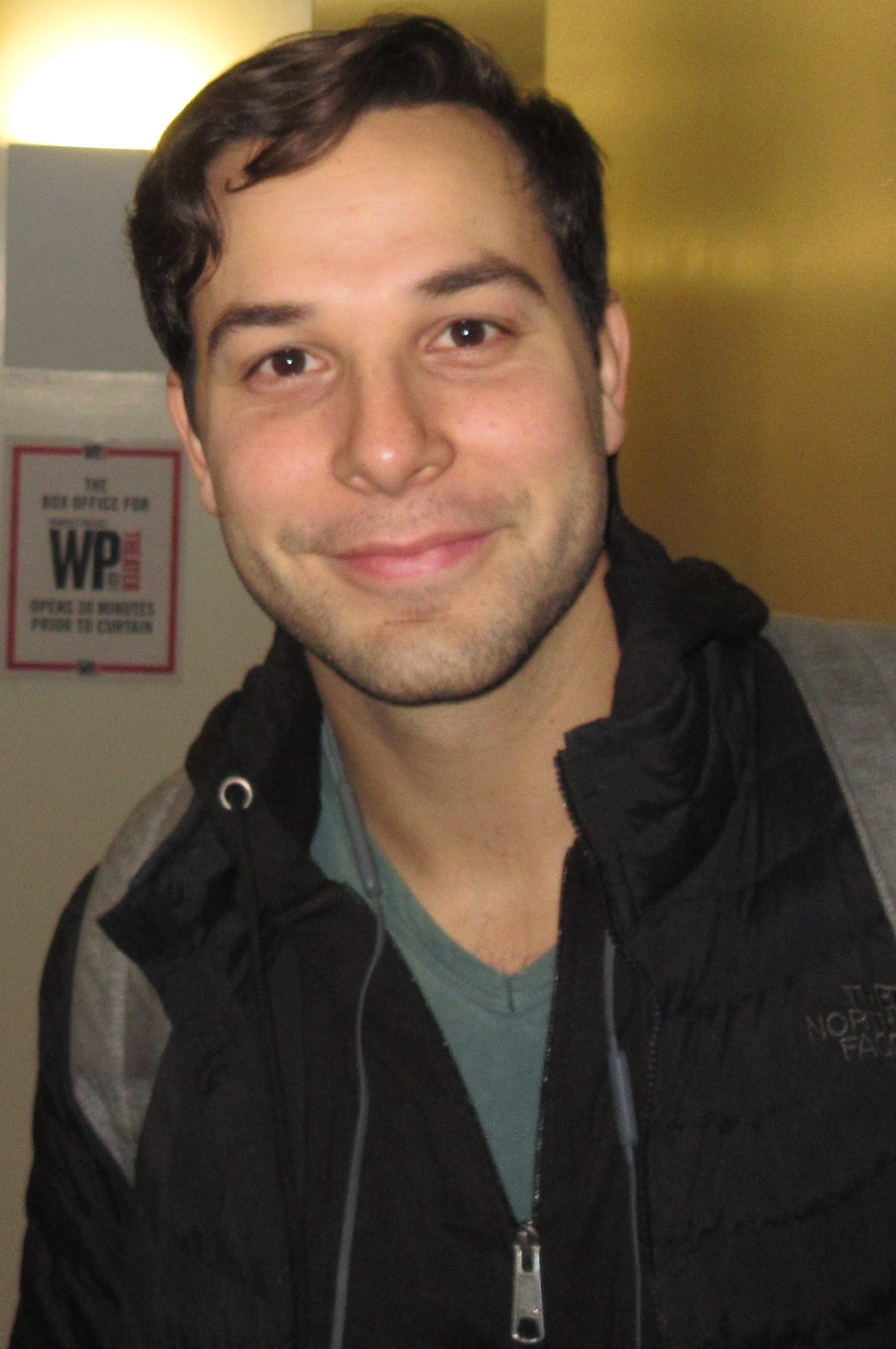
Skylar Astin

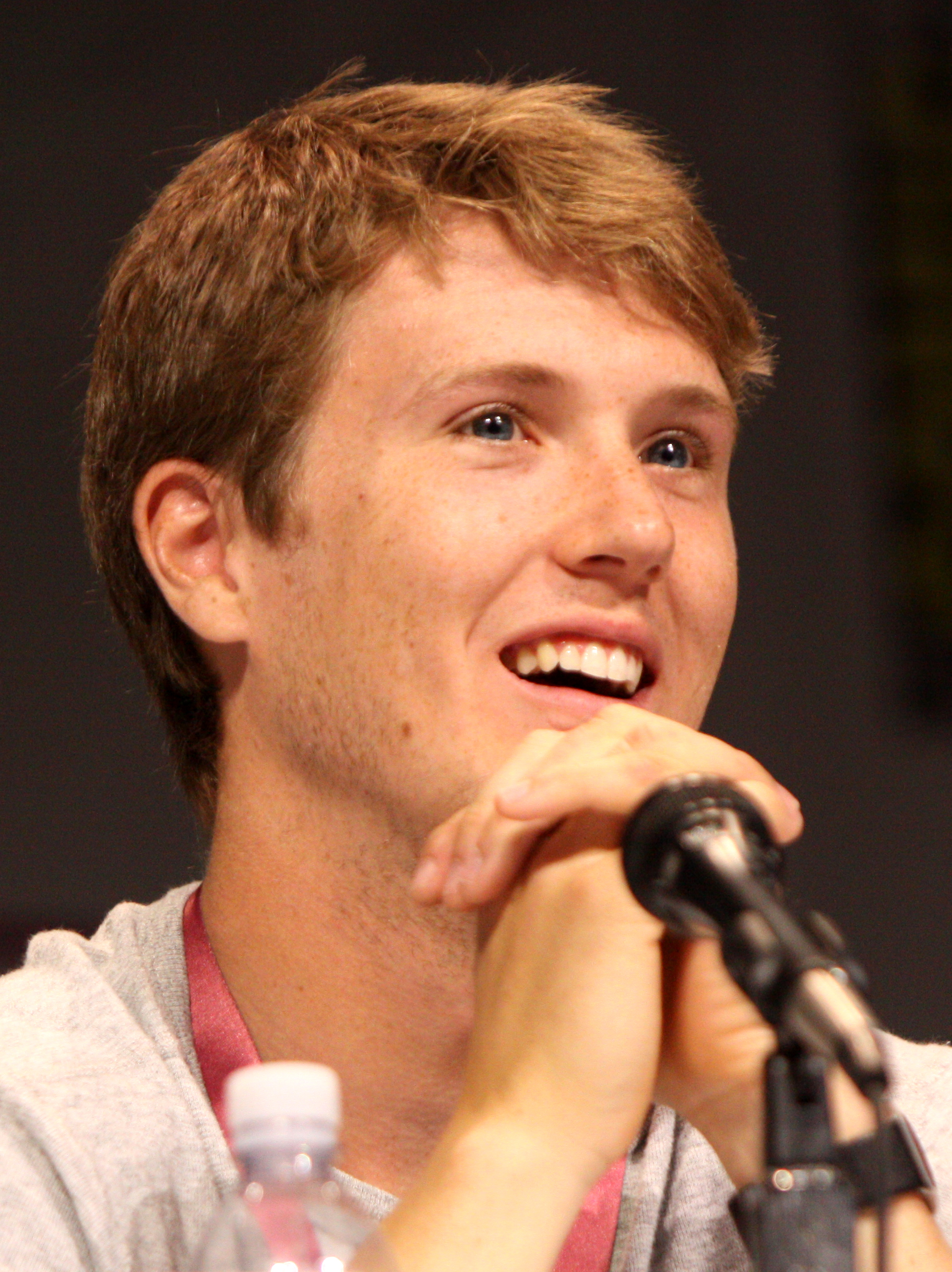
Spencer Treat Clark

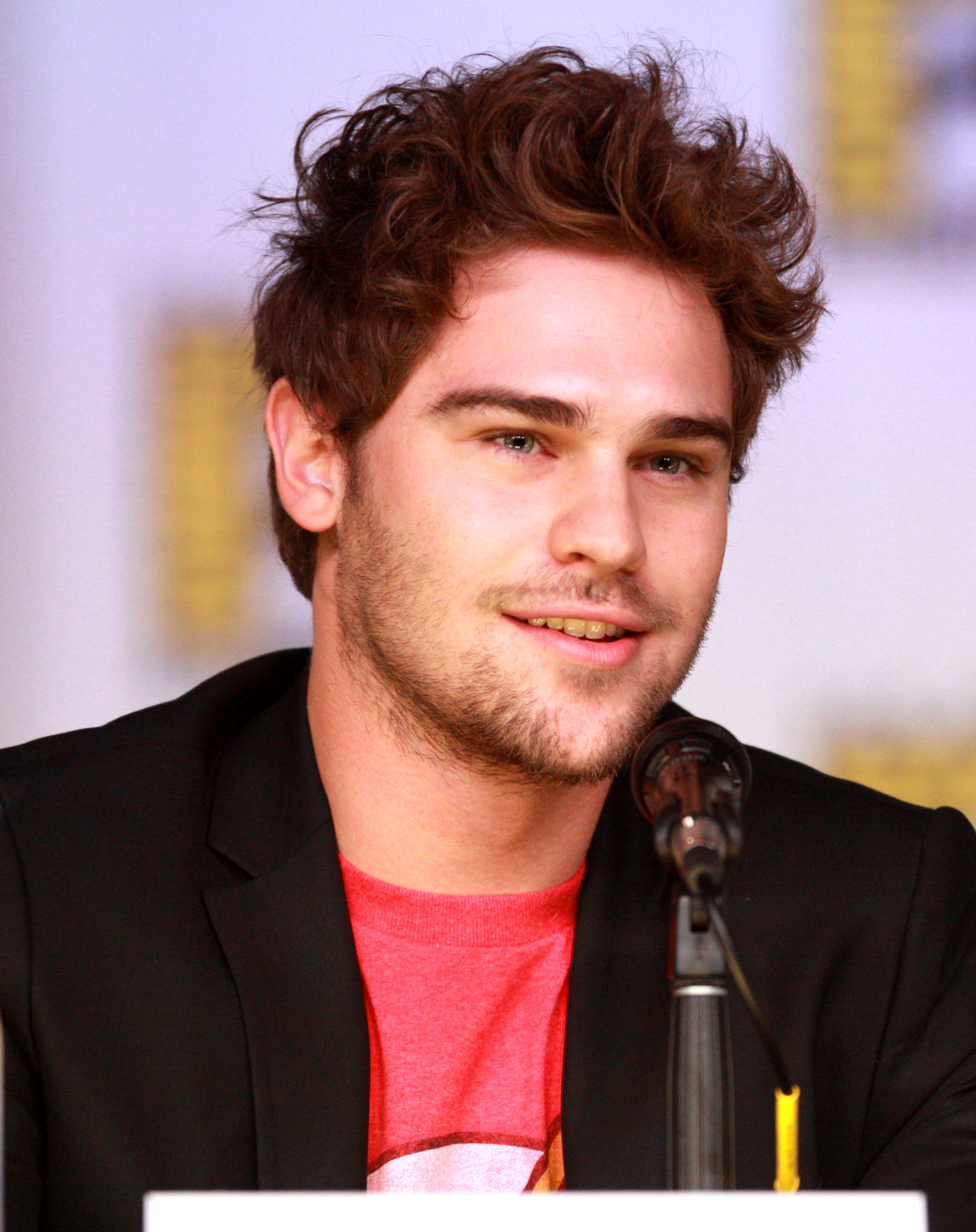
Grey Damon

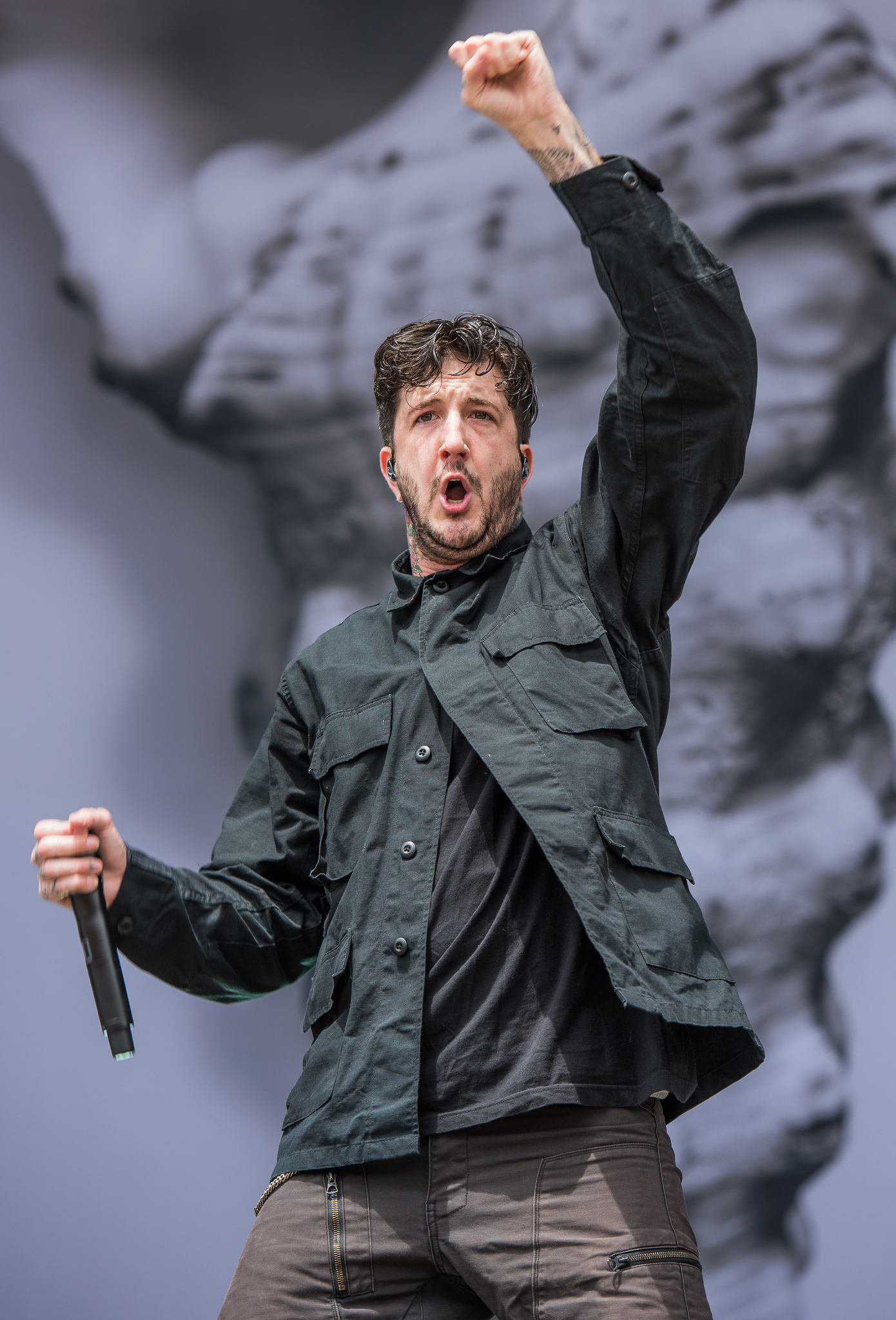
Austin Carlile

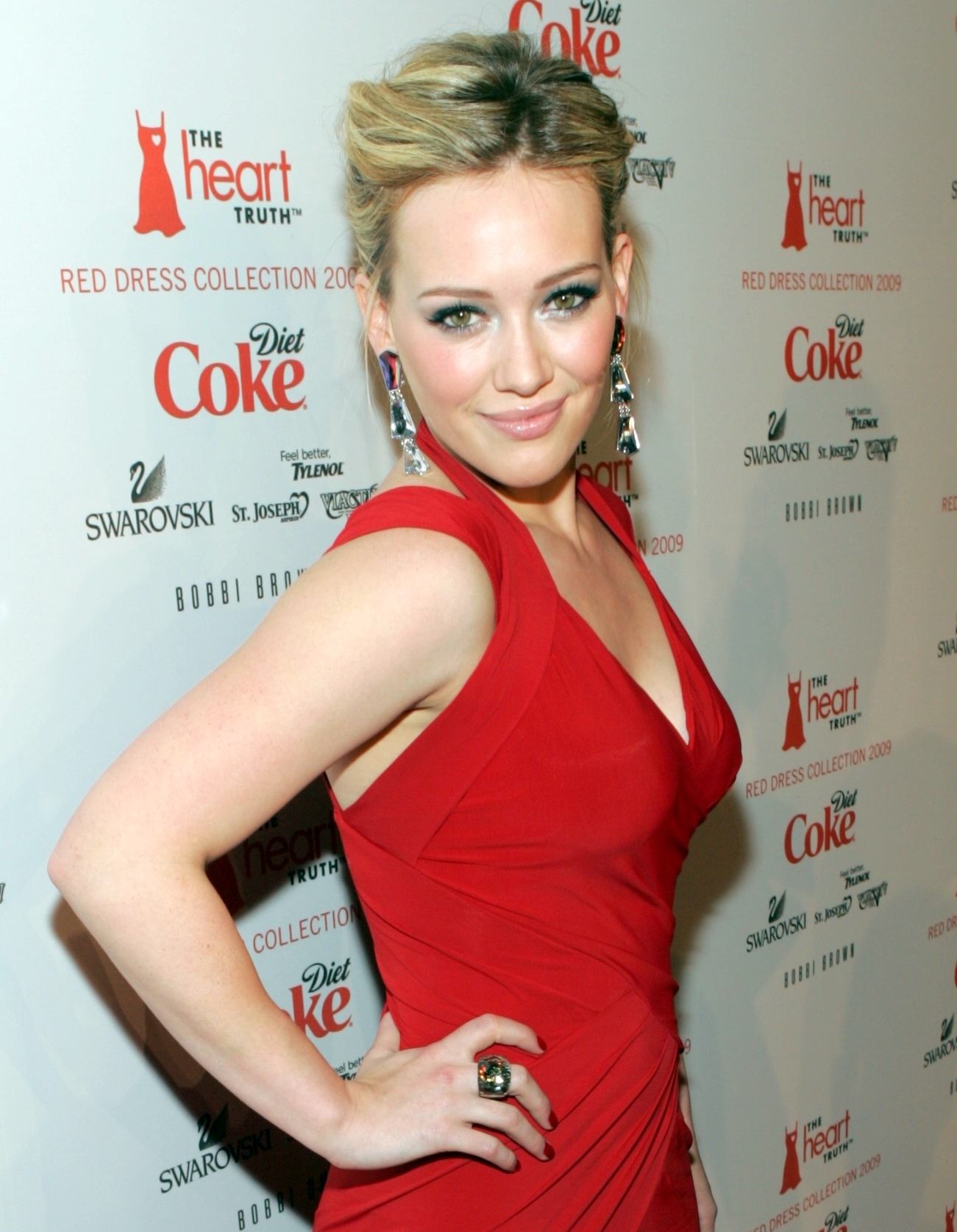
Hilary Duff

- September 1
  - Duke Calhoun, football player
  - Sami Callihan, wrestler
  - David Carpenter, baseball player
  - Jay Armstrong Johnson, actor, singer, and dancer
- September 2 – Spencer Smith, musician
- September 3
  - Megan Amram, comedian, writer, producer, and performer
  - Domonic Brown, baseball player
- September 4
  - Kris Adams, football player
  - Wesley Blake, wrestler
- September 5
  - Lakia Aisha Barber, basketball player
  - Scott Barnes, baseball player
  - Gilbert Brown, basketball player
- September 6
  - Mario Addison, football player
  - Ramiele Malubay, singer
- September 7
  - L. J. Castile, football player
  - Lily Cowles, actress
  - Evan Rachel Wood, actress, model and musician
- September 8
  - Derrick Brown, basketball player
  - Ray Fisher, actor
  - Wiz Khalifa, rapper
  - Justin Peck, choreographer, director, and ballet dancer
- September 9
  - Taylor Bagley, actress and model
  - Sean Cashman, baseball coach
  - Riley Cooper, football player
  - Clayton Snyder, actor
- September 10
  - Rushern Baker IV, painter and political candidate
  - Rhett Bernstein, soccer player
  - Paul Goldschmidt, baseball player
  - Alex Saxon, actor
- September 11 – Tyler Hoechlin, actor
- September 12 – Huey, rapper (d. 2020)
- September 13
  - Juan Archuleta, mixed martial artist
  - Marcus Henderson, actor
  - Erin Way, actress
- September 14
  - Alade Aminu, basketball player
  - Cameron Bradfield, football player
  - Michael Crabtree, football player
  - Chad Duell, actor
- September 15 – Alex Torres, metalcore guitarist
- September 16
  - Colin Cloherty, football player
  - Daren Kagasoff, actor
  - Anthony Padilla, YouTuber and co-founder of Smosh
  - Travis Wall, actor
- September 17 – Lionel Brown, soccer player
- September 19
  - Kayla Barron, submarine warfare officer, engineer and NASA astronaut
  - Tommie Campbell, football player
  - Danielle Panabaker, actress
- September 20
  - Jack Lawless, musician
  - Sarah Natochenny, actress and voice actress
- September 21
  - Jimmy Clausen, football player
  - Ryan Guzman, actor
  - Pat Nagle, Olympic hockey player
  - Anthony Vincent, musician
- September 22 – Teyonah Parris, actress
- September 23 – Skylar Astin, actor, model and singer
- September 24
  - Spencer Treat Clark, actor
  - Grey Damon, actor
  - Brit Morgan, actress
  - Trinidad James, rapper
- September 25
  - Massimo Agostinelli, English-born artist, entrepreneur, and activist
  - Lars Anderson, baseball player
  - David Ausberry, football player
  - Greg Bates, country singer/songwriter
- September 27
  - Tim Atchison, football player
  - Austin Carlile, musician and baseball coach, frontman for Attack Attack! (2006–2008) and Of Mice & Men (2009–2010, 2011–2016)
- September 28
  - Josh Alexander, basketball player
  - Terence Crawford, boxer
  - Hilary Duff, actress and singer
  - Scott Fitzpatrick, politician
- September 29
  - David Del Rio, actor
  - Josh Farro, singer and guitarist for Paramore (2004–2010) and frontman for Novel American and Farro
- September 30 – Melinda Sullivan, dancer, choreographer and actress

=== October ===
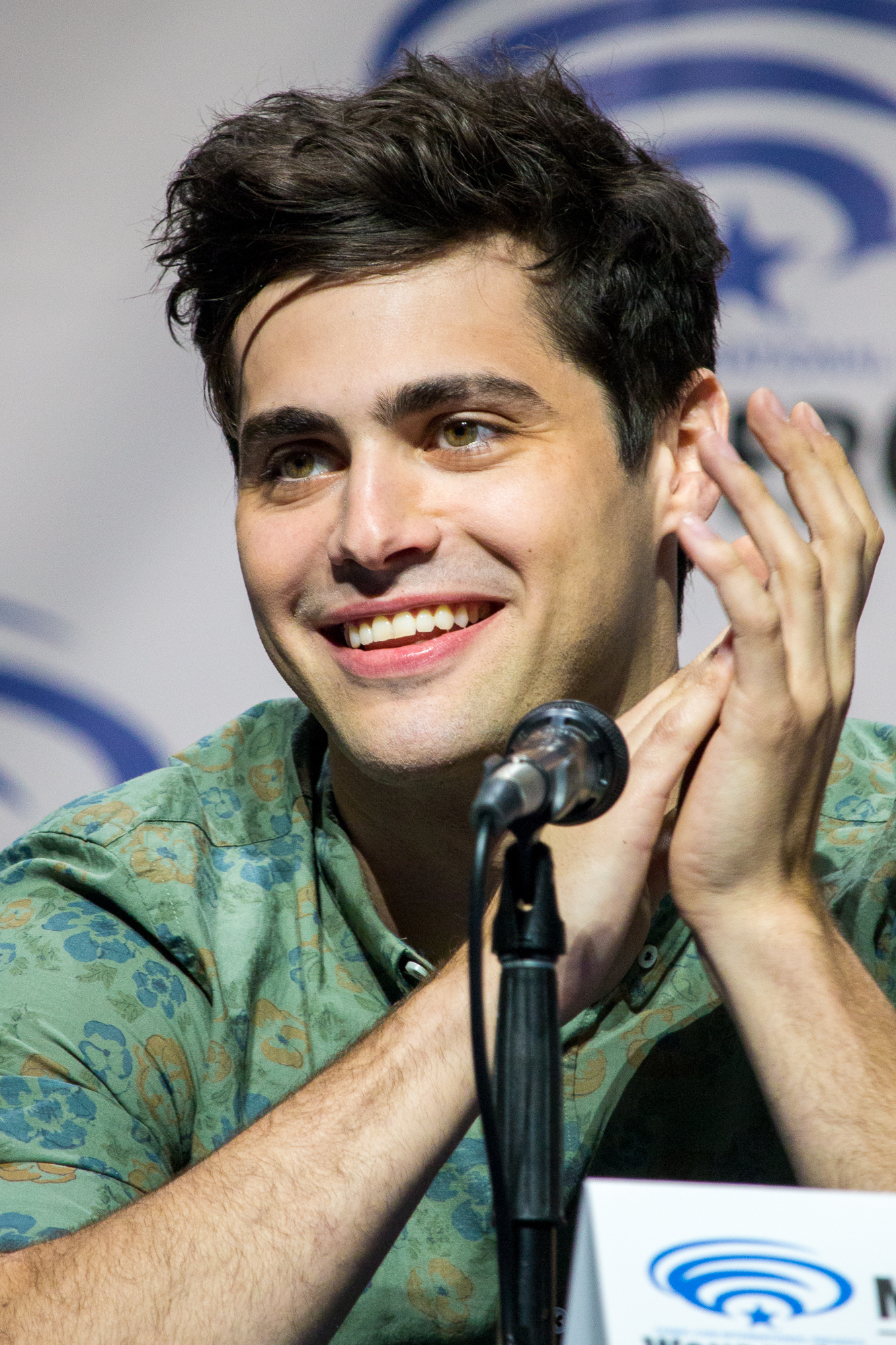
Matthew Daddario

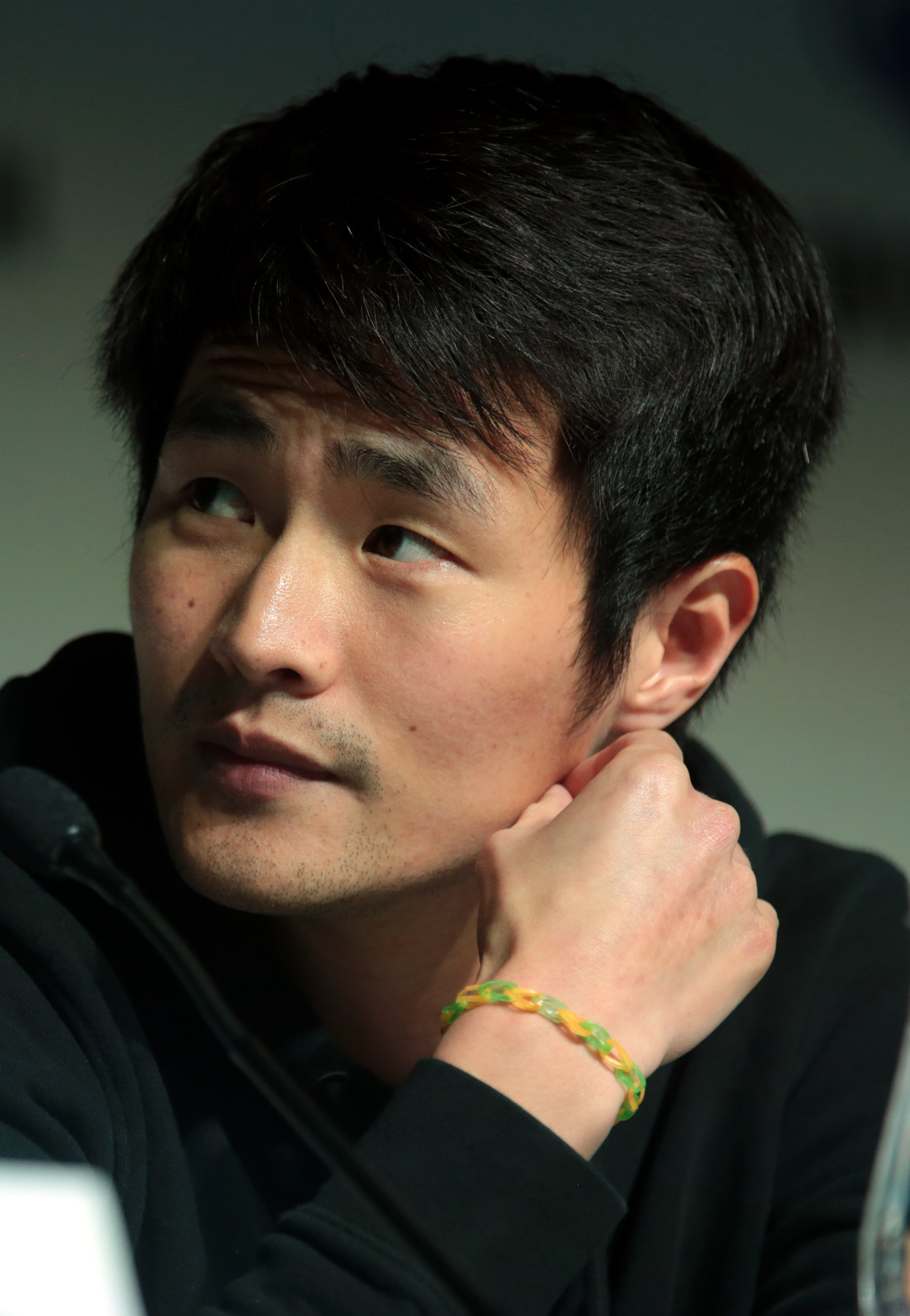
Christopher Larkin

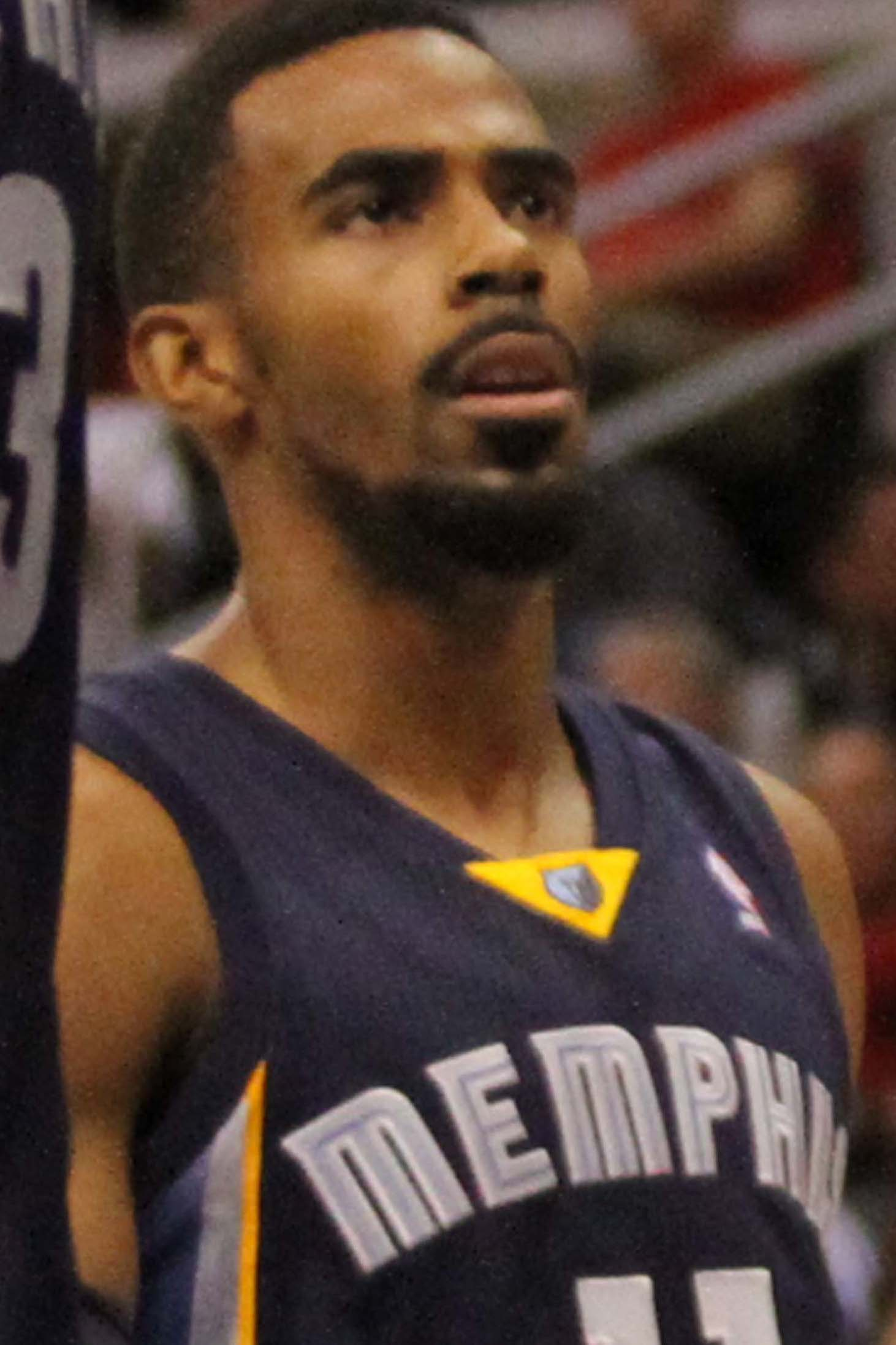
Mike Conley Jr.

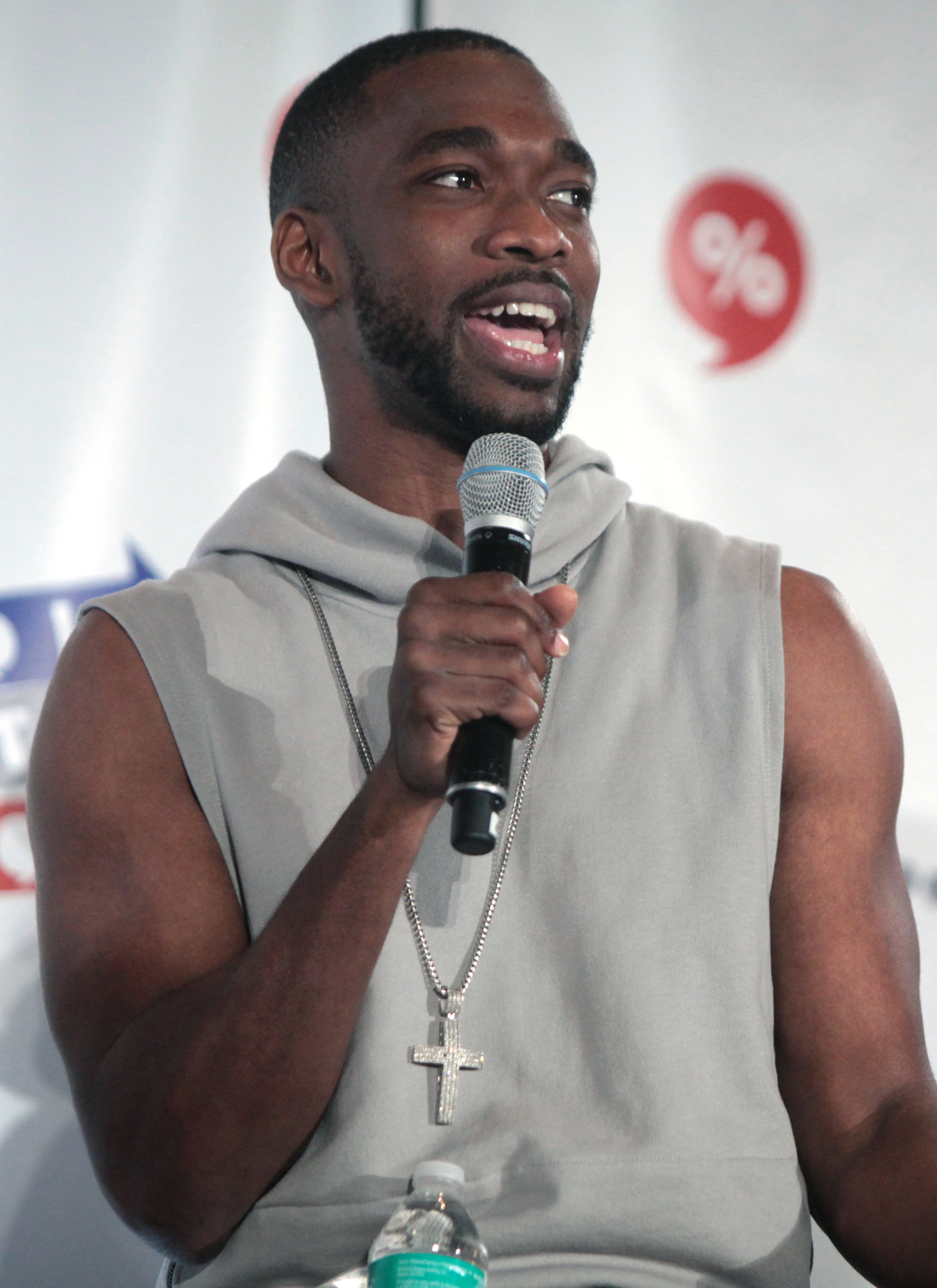
Jay Pharoah

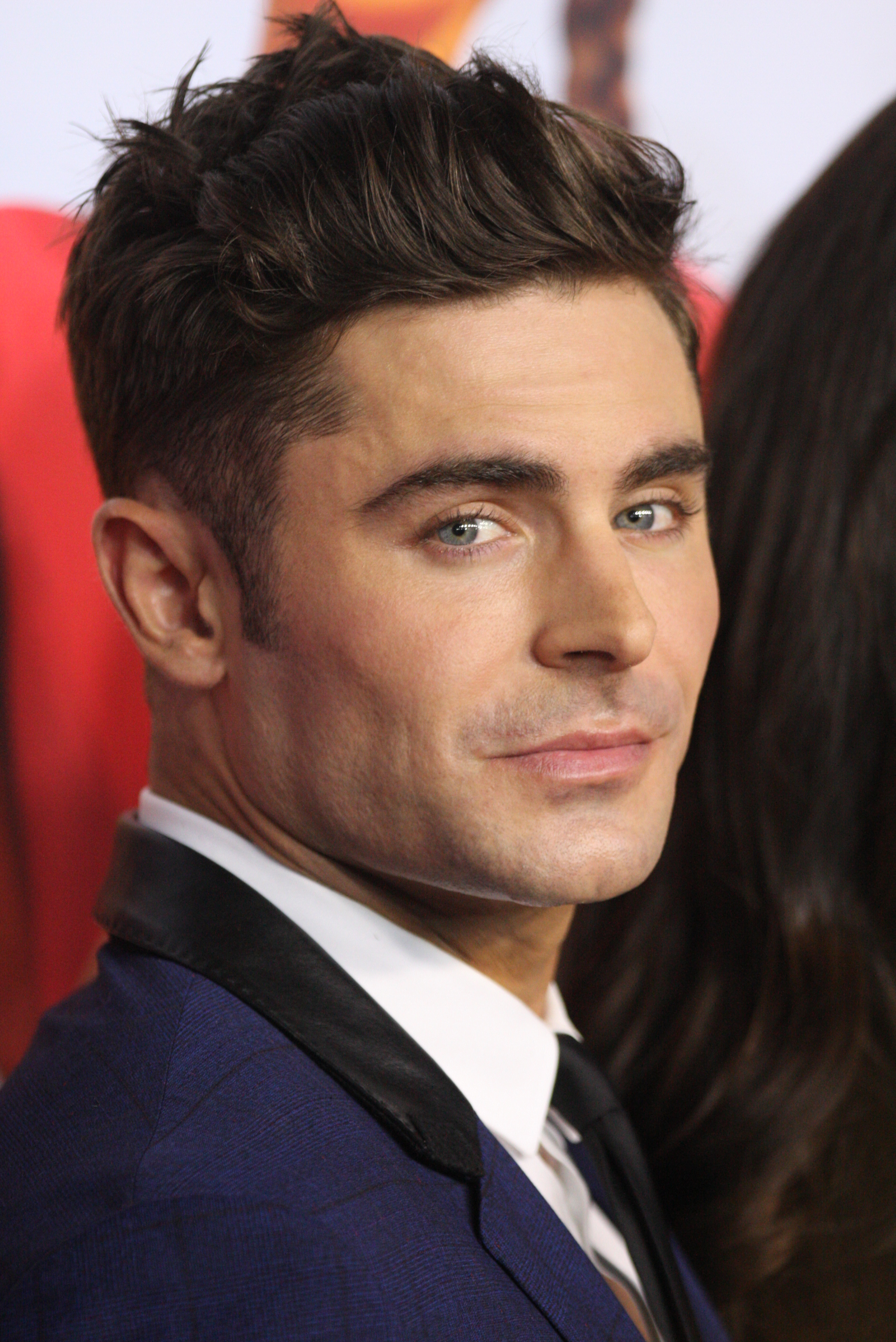
Zac Efron

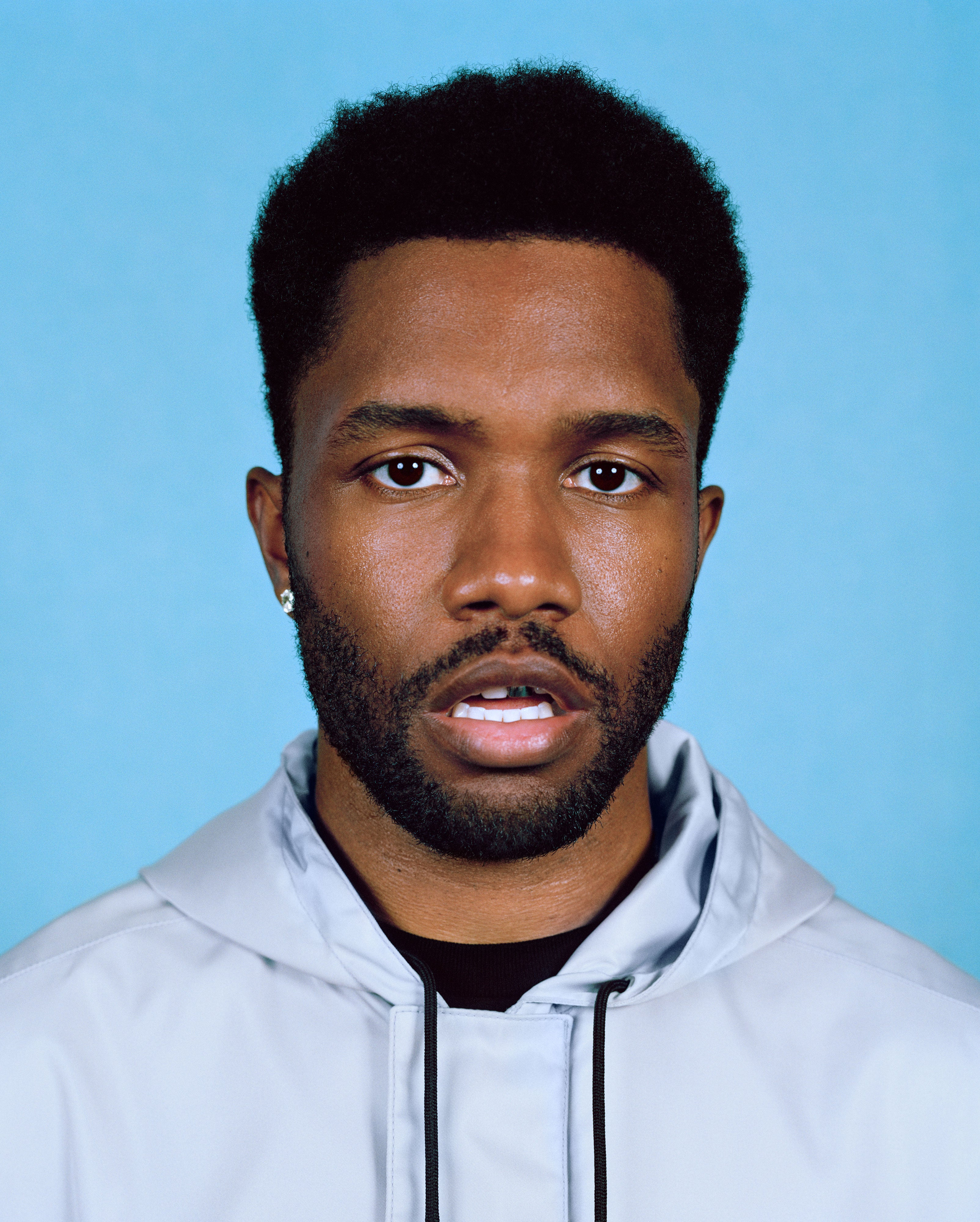
Frank Ocean

- October 1
  - Jennifer Bricker, acrobat and aerialist
  - Matthew Daddario, actor
  - Stuart Lafferty, actor
  - Jason McElwain, autistic athlete and public speaker
- October 2
  - Christopher Larkin, Korean-born actor
  - Phil Kessel, hockey player
  - Ricky Stenhouse Jr., stock car racer
- October 3 – Kaci Battaglia, singer/songwriter, dancer, and actress
- October 5
  - Cory Brandon, football player
  - Foluke Gunderson, Canadian-born Olympic volleyball player
- October 6
  - Jonathan Blake, basketball player
  - Samuel, musician
- October 7
  - David Arkin, football player
  - Alex Cobb, baseball player
  - Aiden English, wrestler
- October 8 – Chris Baker, football player
- October 9
  - ActionKid, YouTuber and IRL livestreamer
  - Craig Brackins, basketball player
  - Cory Burns, baseball player
  - Aubrey Coleman, basketball player
  - Melissa Villaseñor, actress and comedian
- October 10
  - Adrian Cárdenas, baseball player
  - Carla Esparza, mixed martial artist
- October 11
  - Tony Beltran, soccer player
  - Mike Conley Jr., basketball player
- October 14
  - Eben Britton, baseball player
  - Jalil Brown, football player and coach
  - Kole Calhoun, baseball player
  - Chloe Coscarelli, vegan chef and author
  - Jay Pharoah, actor
- October 15
  - Marcel Brache, rugby player
  - Alan Chin, contemporary artist
  - Jesse Levine, American-born Canadian tennis player
- October 17 – Seth Mosley, singer/songwriter and frontman for Me in Motion
- October 18
  - Matt Bosher, football player
  - Brian Carlwell, basketball player
  - Zac Efron, actor
- October 19 – Rick Boogs, wrestler
- October 20 – Jerry Brown, football player (d. 2012)
- October 23 – Carmella, wrestler, dancer, and model
- October 24
  - Kwame Adjeman-Pamboe, English-born soccer player
  - Sabrina Cervantes, politician
  - Chris Holdsworth, mixed martial artist
  - Charlie White, Olympic ice dancer
- October 25
  - Bill Amis, basketball player
  - Keith Berry, mixed martial artist
- October 26
  - Hannah Bronfman, DJ, social media influencer, and entrepreneur
  - Zena Cardman, geobiologist and NASA astronaut
  - Portia Perez, wrestler
- October 27
  - Andrew Bynum, basketball player
  - Shawn Porter, boxer
- October 28
  - Javier Arenas, football player
  - Frank Ocean, rapper
  - Tatu Baby, tattoo artist and reality television personality
- October 29 – Ariana Berlin, artistic gymnast, dancer, film actress, and senior producer at Fox Sports
- October 30
  - Adrian Battles, football player
  - Cesar Chavez, Mexican-born Mariachi singer and politician
  - Matt Conn, founder of MidBoss and creator of GaymerX
  - Casey Crawford, basketball player
- October 31 – Clara Chung, singer/songwriter, producer, and composer

=== November ===
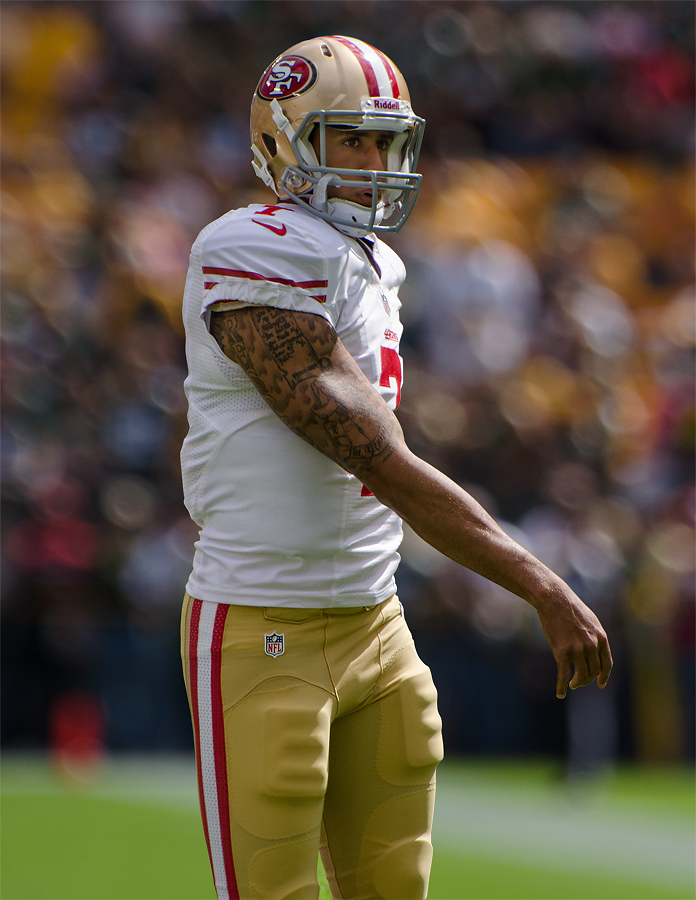
Colin Kaepernick

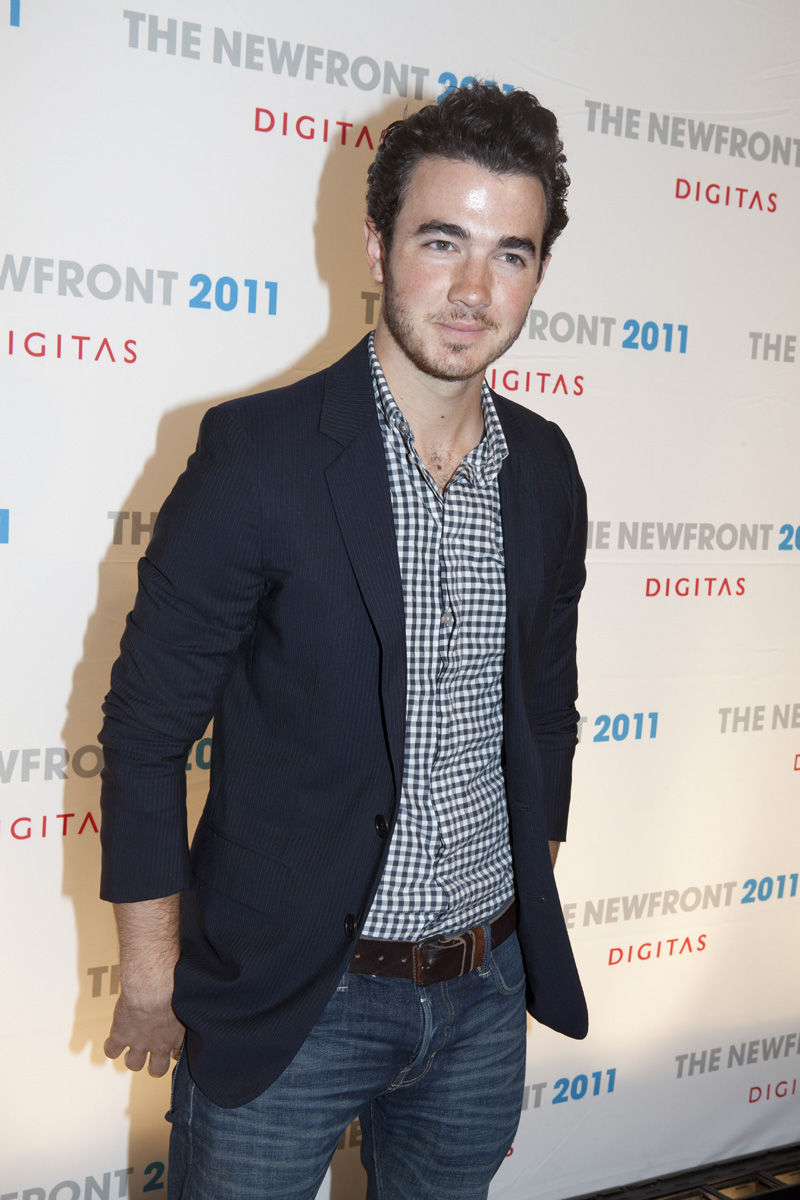
Kevin Jonas

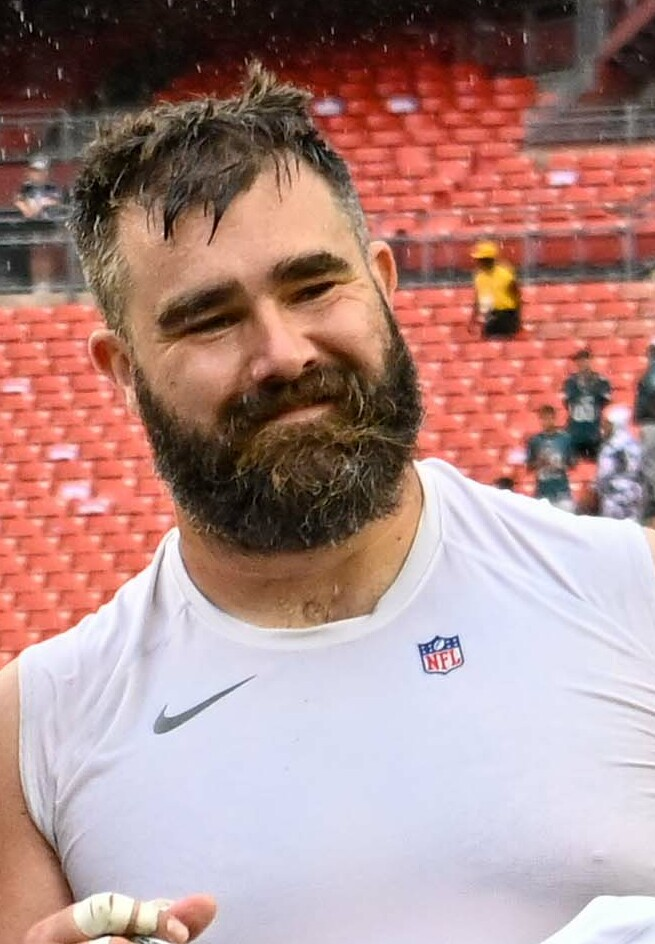
Jason Kelce

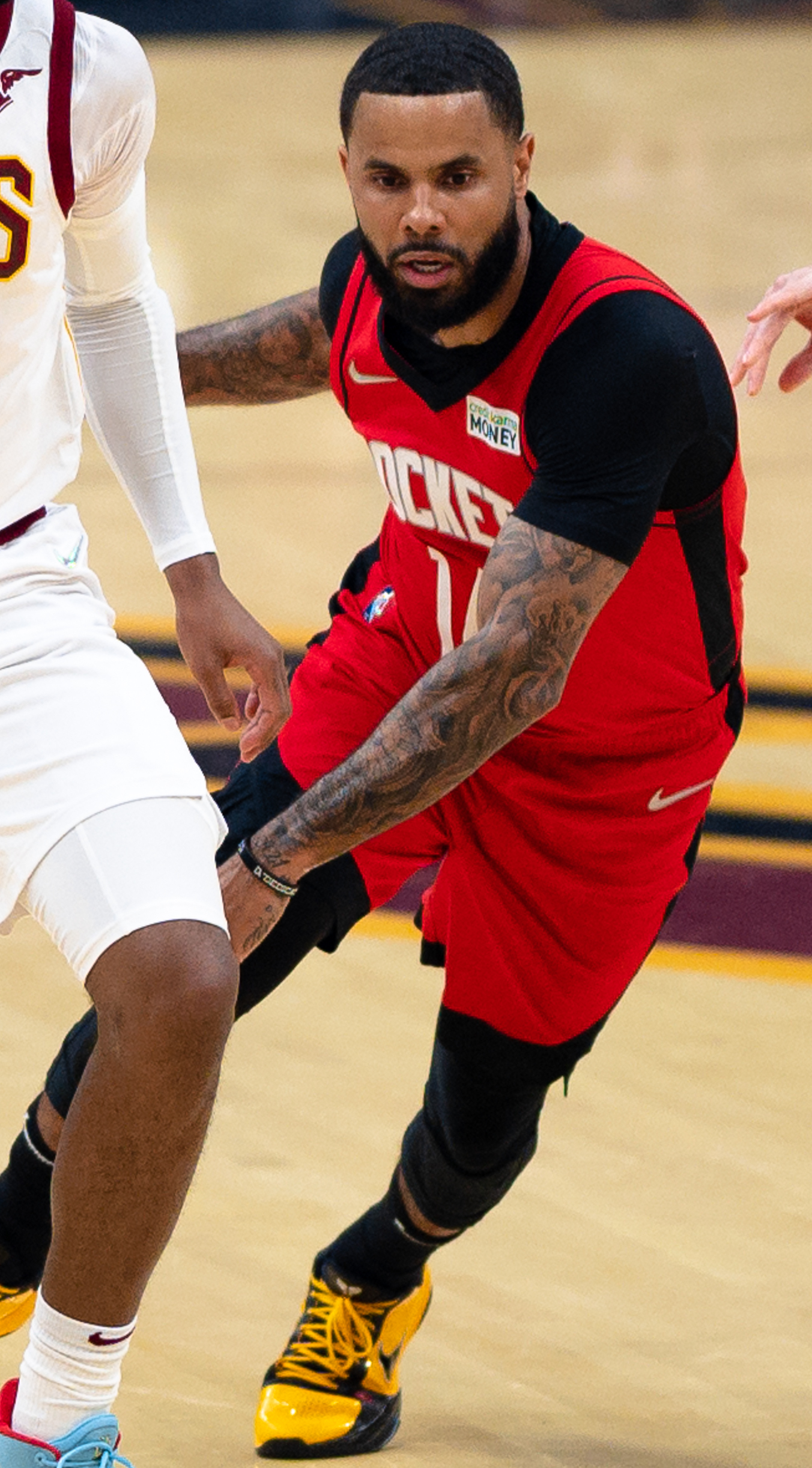
D. J. Augustin

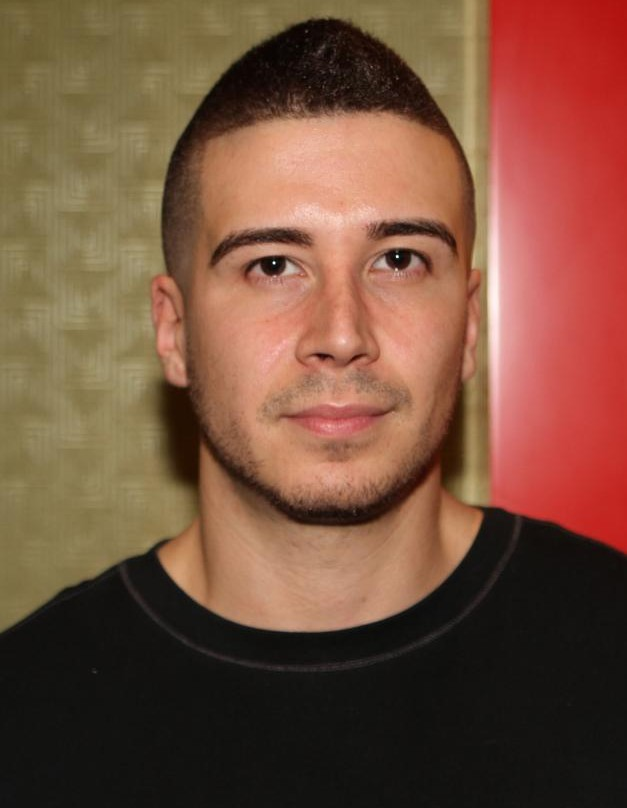
Vinny Guadagnino

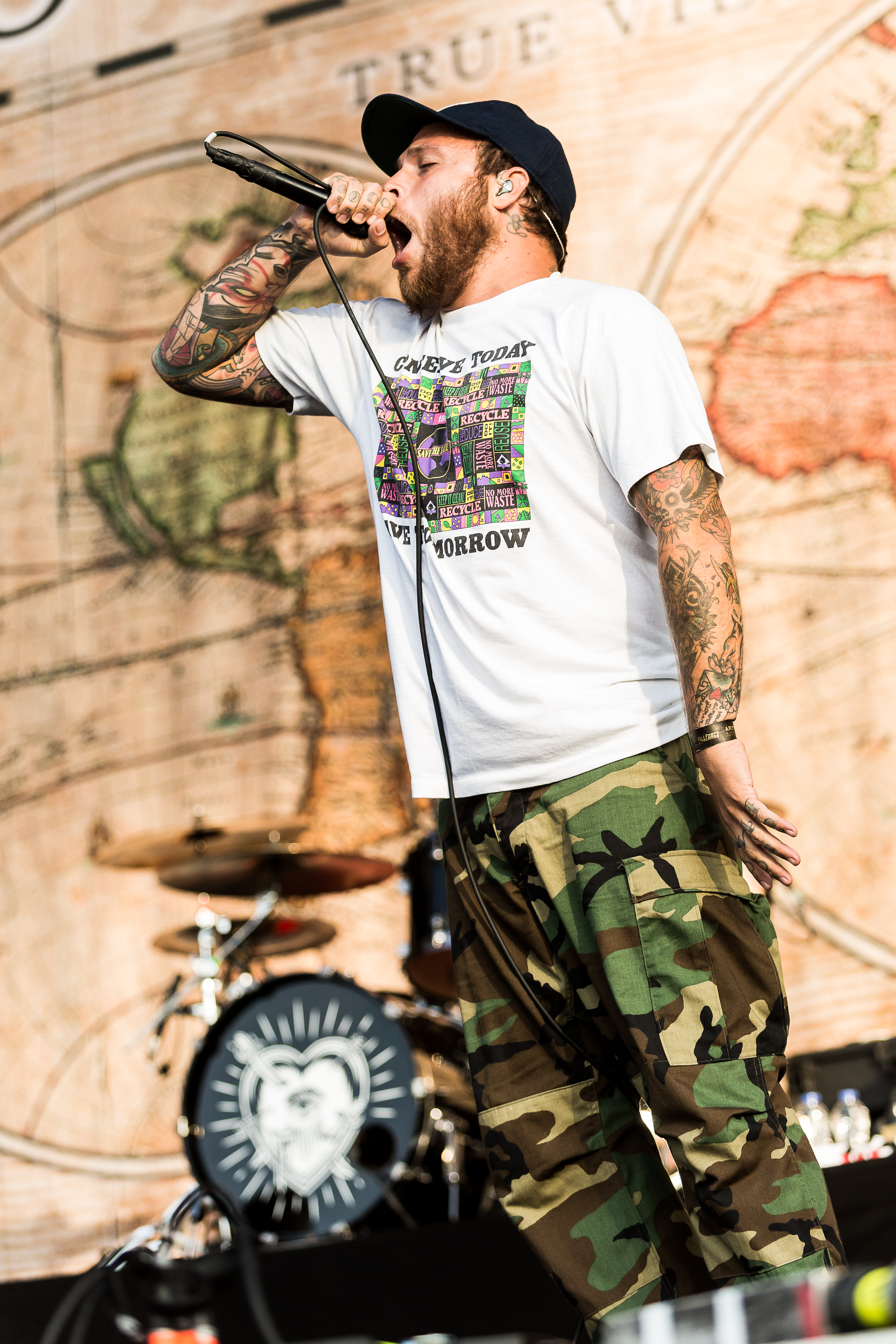
Jesse Barnett

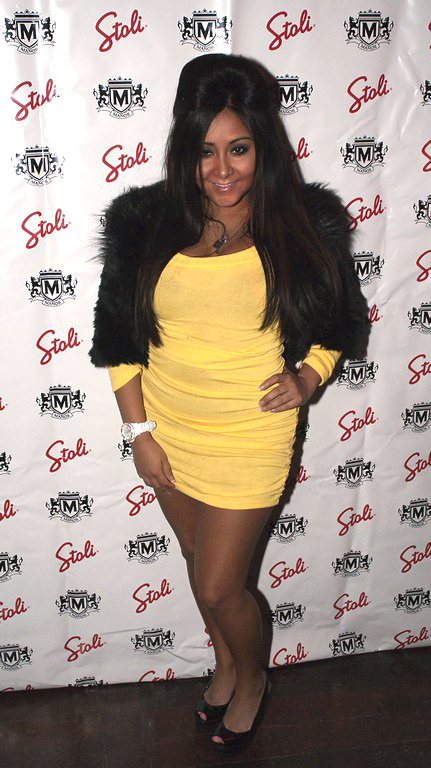
Snooki

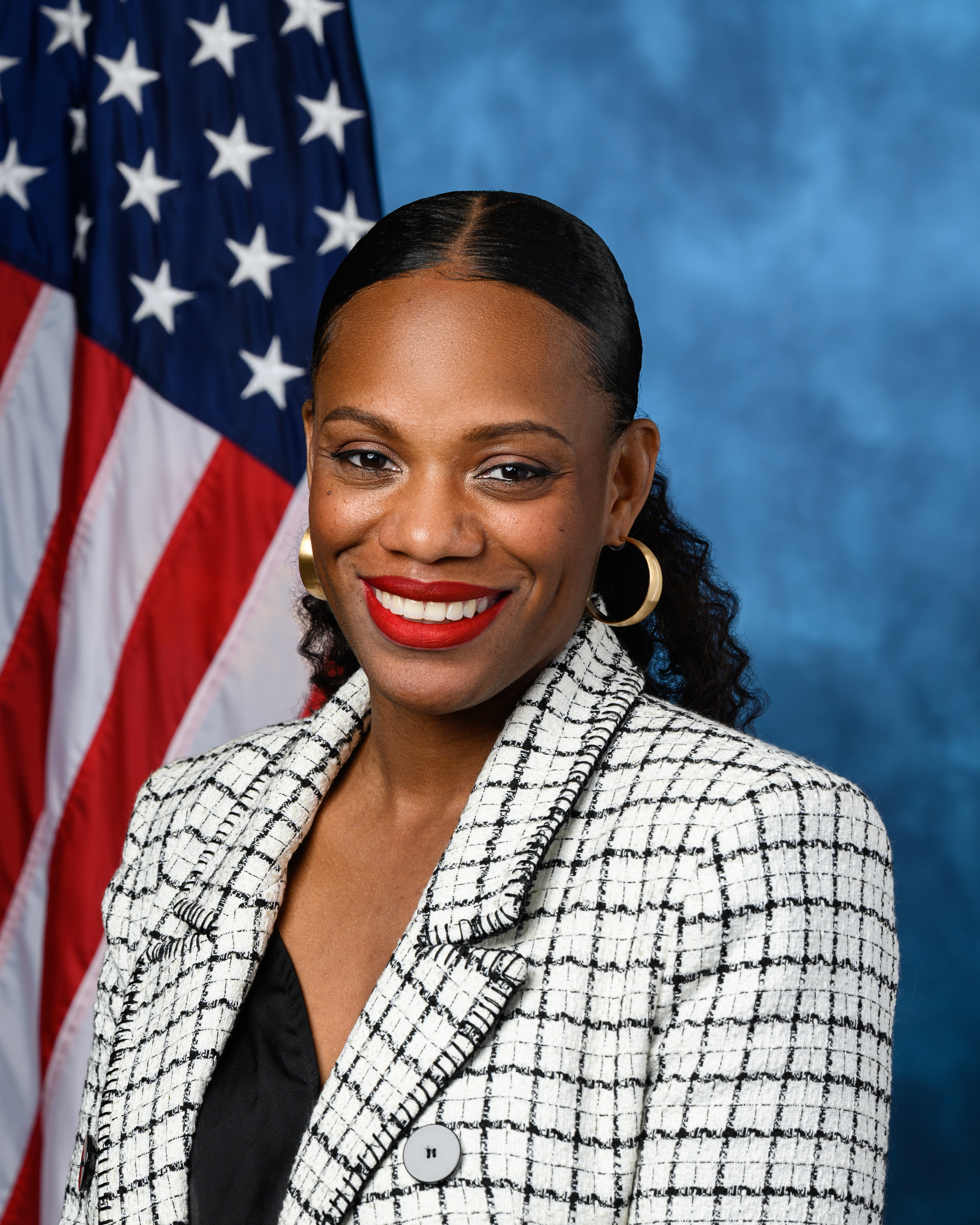
Summer Lee

- November 1
  - Anthony Bass, baseball player
  - Jack Bolas, middle-distance runner
  - Bo Bowling, football player
  - Zach Cherry, actor and comedian
  - Bruce Irvin, football player
- November 2
  - Kodi Augustus, basketball player
  - Itan Chavira, ice hockey player
- November 3
  - Ariane Andrew, wrestler and model
  - Ty Lawson, basketball player
  - Colin Kaepernick, football player
  - Kyle Seager, baseball player
  - Elizabeth Smart, kidnap victim, activist and contributor to ABC News
- November 4
  - Jermaine Beal, basketball player
  - Shady Blaze, rapper
  - Trouble, rapper (d. 2022)
- November 5
  - Erin Brady, television host, model, and Miss USA 2013
  - Kevin Jonas, actor, singer/songwriter, and member of the Jonas Brothers
  - Jason Kelce, football player
  - Chris Knierim, figure skater
  - O. J. Mayo, basketball player
  - Stephanie Edwards, singer
  - Allysin Kay, wrestler
- November 6 – Caleb Cotham, baseball player
- November 7
  - Hakeem Abdul-Saboor, Olympic bobsledder
  - Howard Barbieri, football player
  - Rachele Brooke Smith, actress and dancer
  - Reba Buhr, voice actress
- November 8 – Sam Bradford, football player
- November 9
  - Brittany Bell, model, dancer, and beauty pageant titleholder
  - Kevin Coble, basketball player
  - Jennifer Holland, actress and model
- November 10
  - Mason Aguirre, Olympic snowboarder
  - D. J. Augustin, basketball player
- November 11 – Vinny Guadagnino, TV personality
- November 13
  - Tim Adleman, baseball player
  - Jesse Barnett, singer and frontman for Stick to Your Gun
- November 15 – Tyler Allen, NASCAR race engineer
- November 18
  - Jake Abel, actor
  - Pierre Allen, football player
  - Joe Cada, poker player
- November 19 – Clare Egan, Olympic biathlete
- November 20
  - Amelia Rose Blaire, actress
  - James Uthmeier, lawyer and politician
- November 21 – Alex Carnerio, Brazilian-born personal trainer
- November 22
  - Erik Barnes, golfer
  - Justin Cole, football player
- November 23
  - Alex Clayton, tennis player
  - Ryan Lane, actor
  - Alexia Rodriguez, guitarist and vocalist for Eyes Set to Kill
  - Snooki, TV personality
- November 24
  - Asiahn, singer/songwriter
  - Eric Avila, soccer player
  - Elena Satine, Georgian-born actress and singer
- November 25
  - Mark Bloom, soccer player
  - Trevor Booker, basketball player
  - Dolla, rapper (d. 2009)
- November 26
  - Kat DeLuna, singer
  - Summer Lee, politician
- November 27 – Darnell Carter, football player
- November 30
  - Nate Allen, football player
  - Chase Anderson, baseball player
  - Trinity Fatu, wrestler
  - Ian Hecox, YouTuber and co-founder of Smosh
  - Christel Khalil, actress

=== December ===
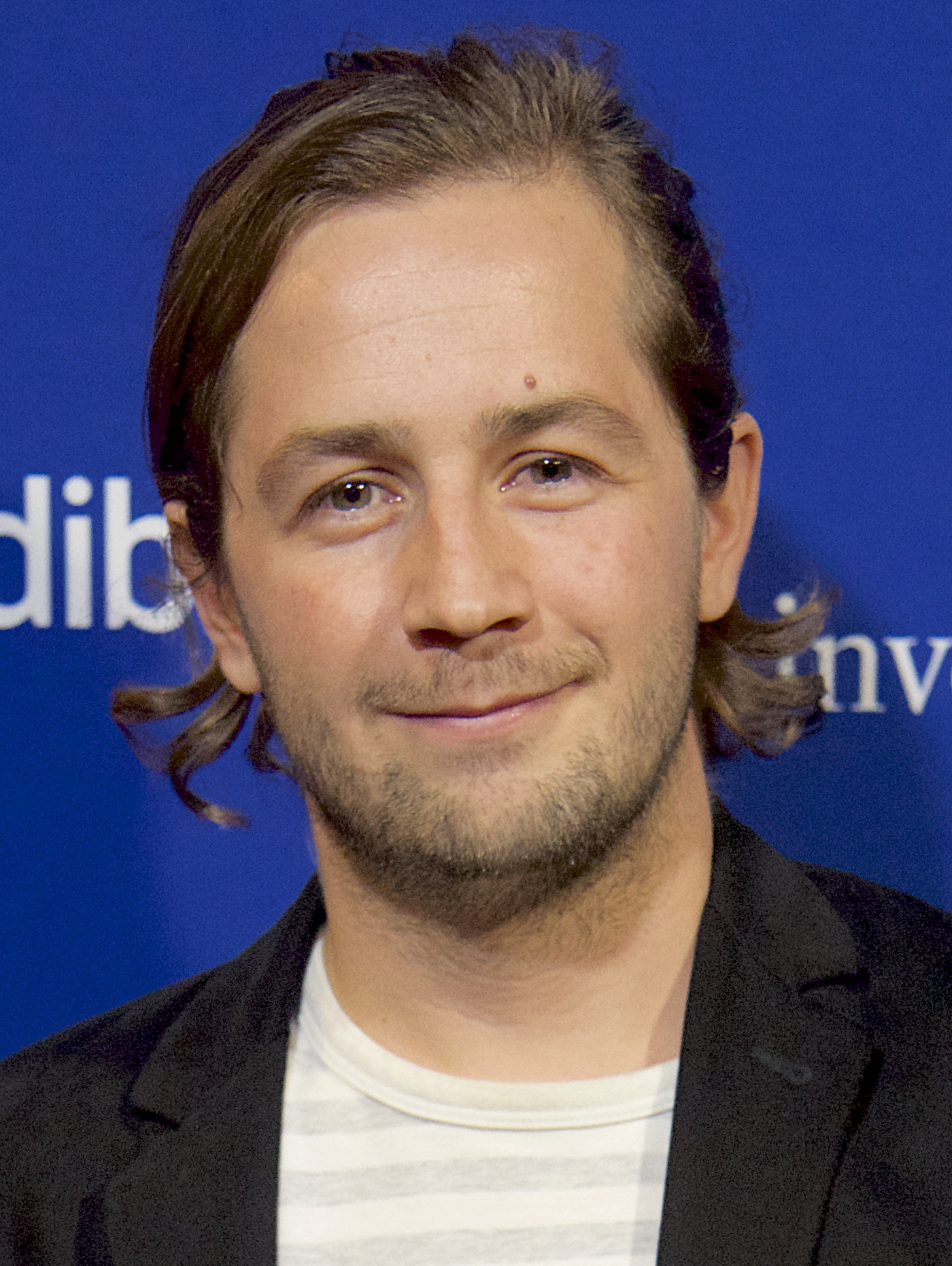
Michael Angarano

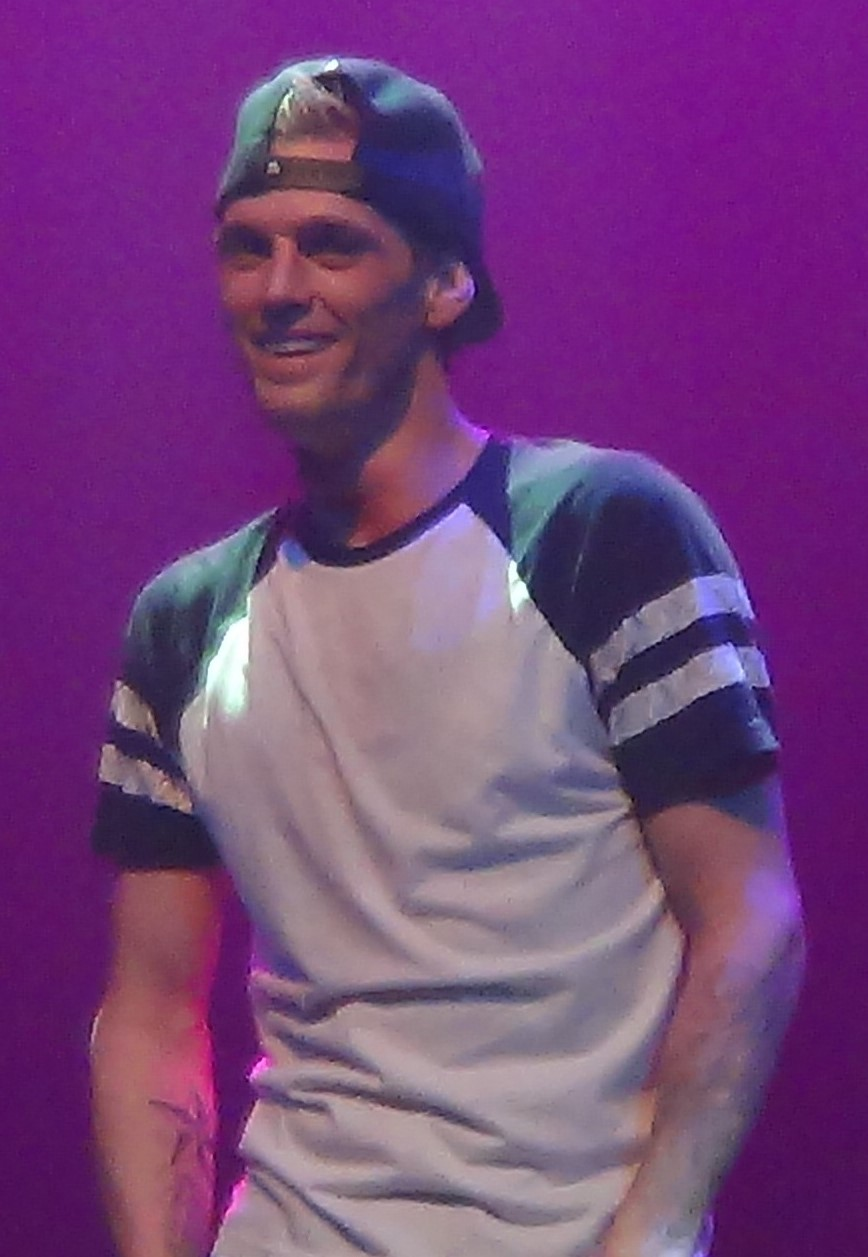
Aaron Carter

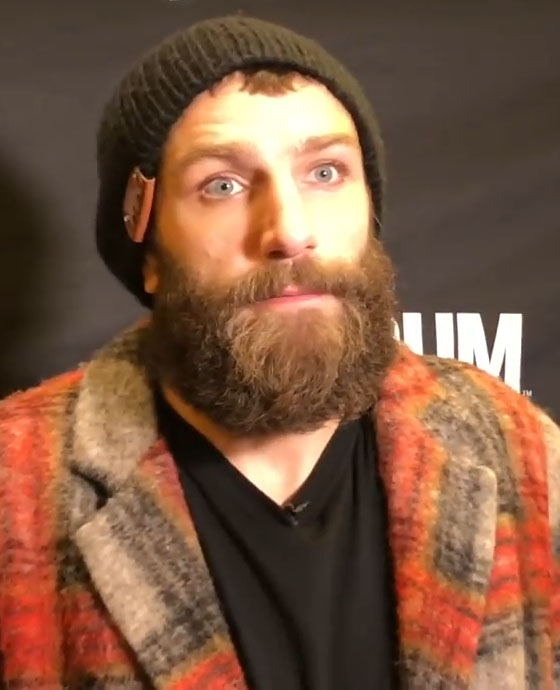
Michael Chiesa

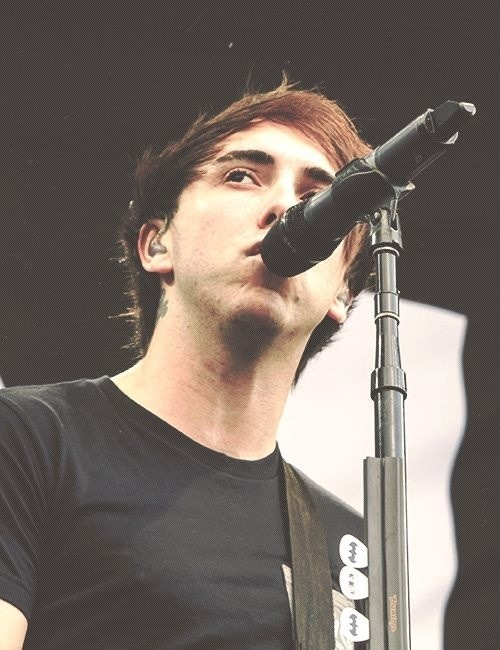
Alex Gaskarth

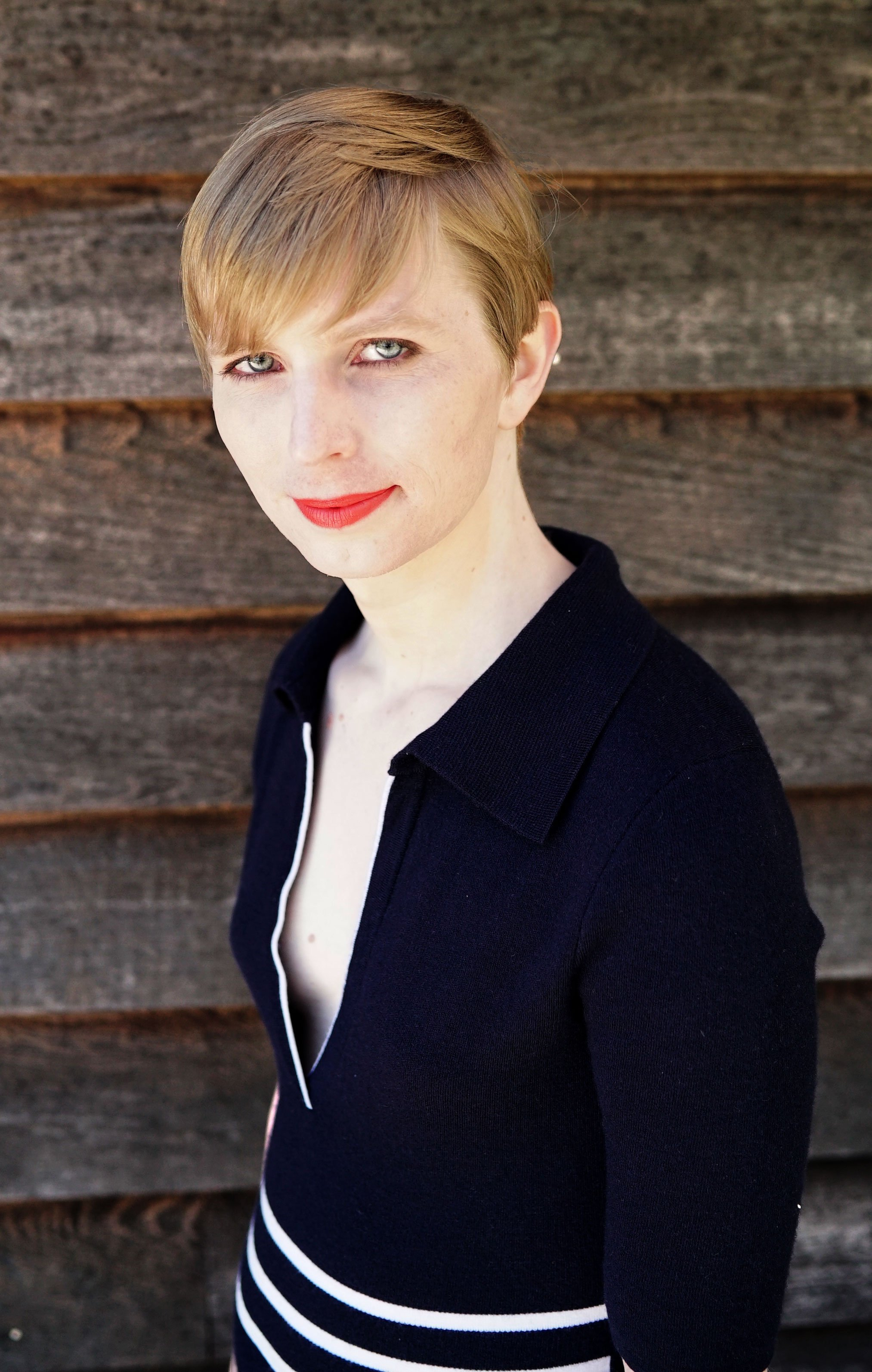
Chelsea Manning

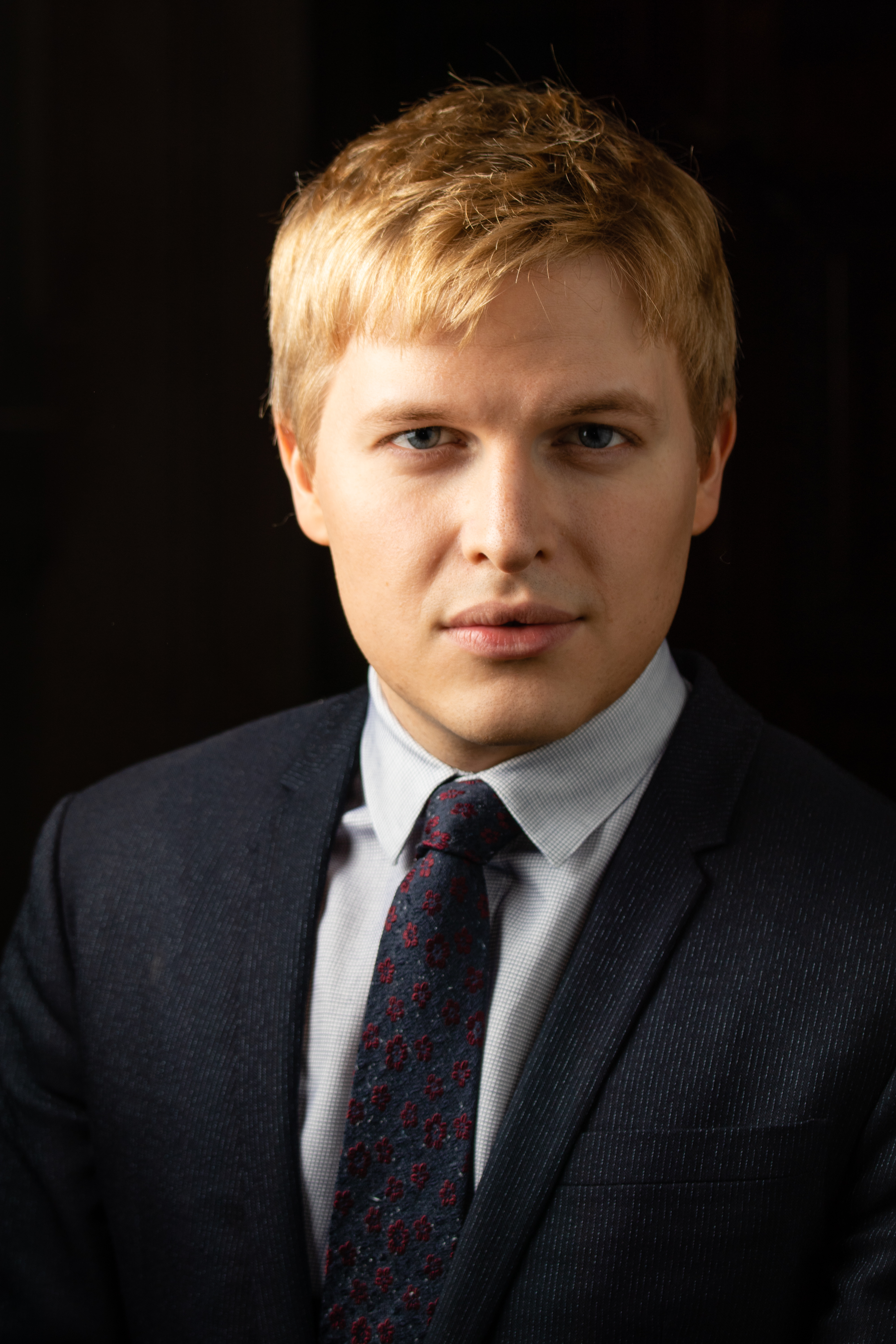
Ronan Farrow

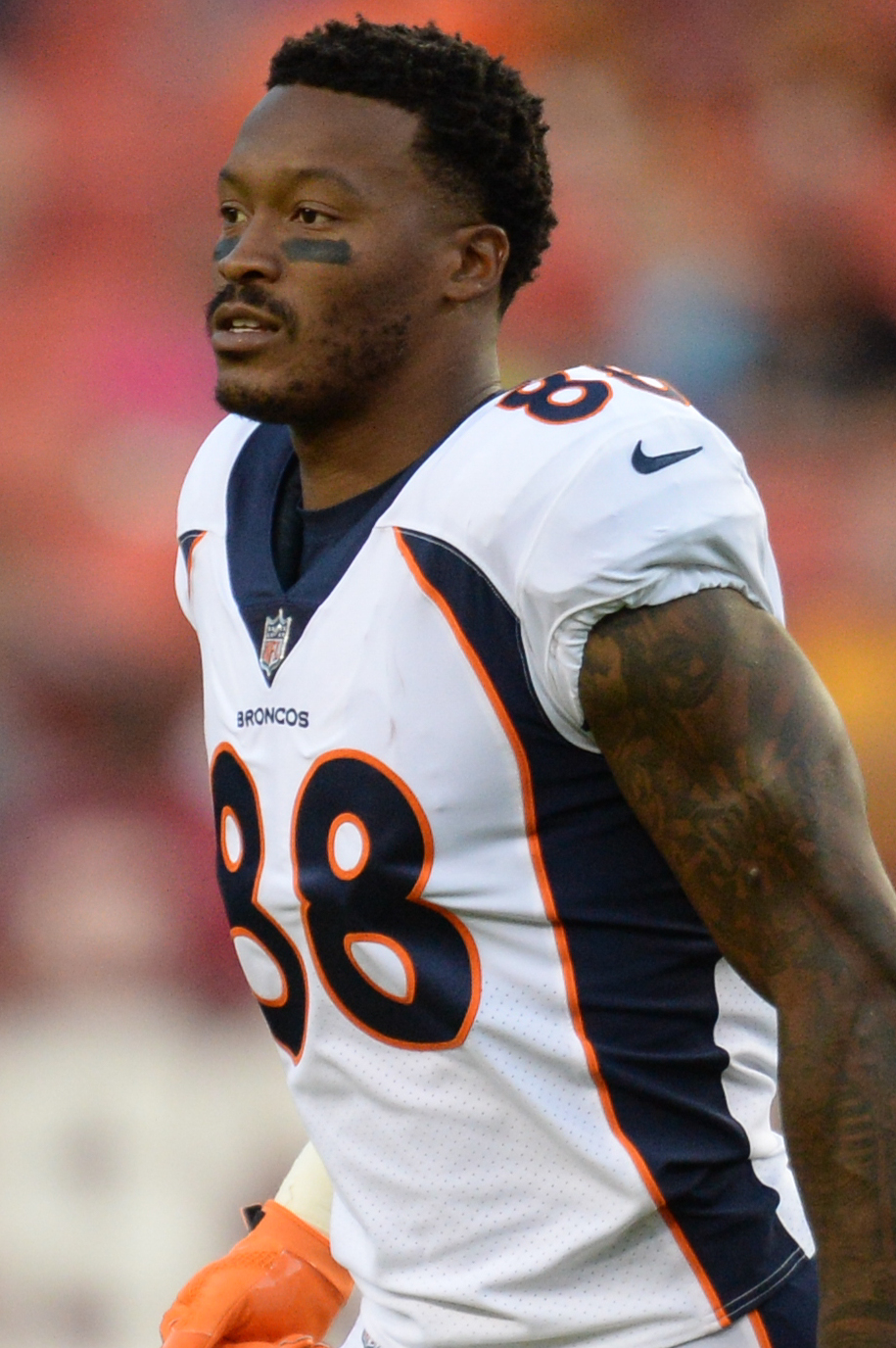
Demaryius Thomas

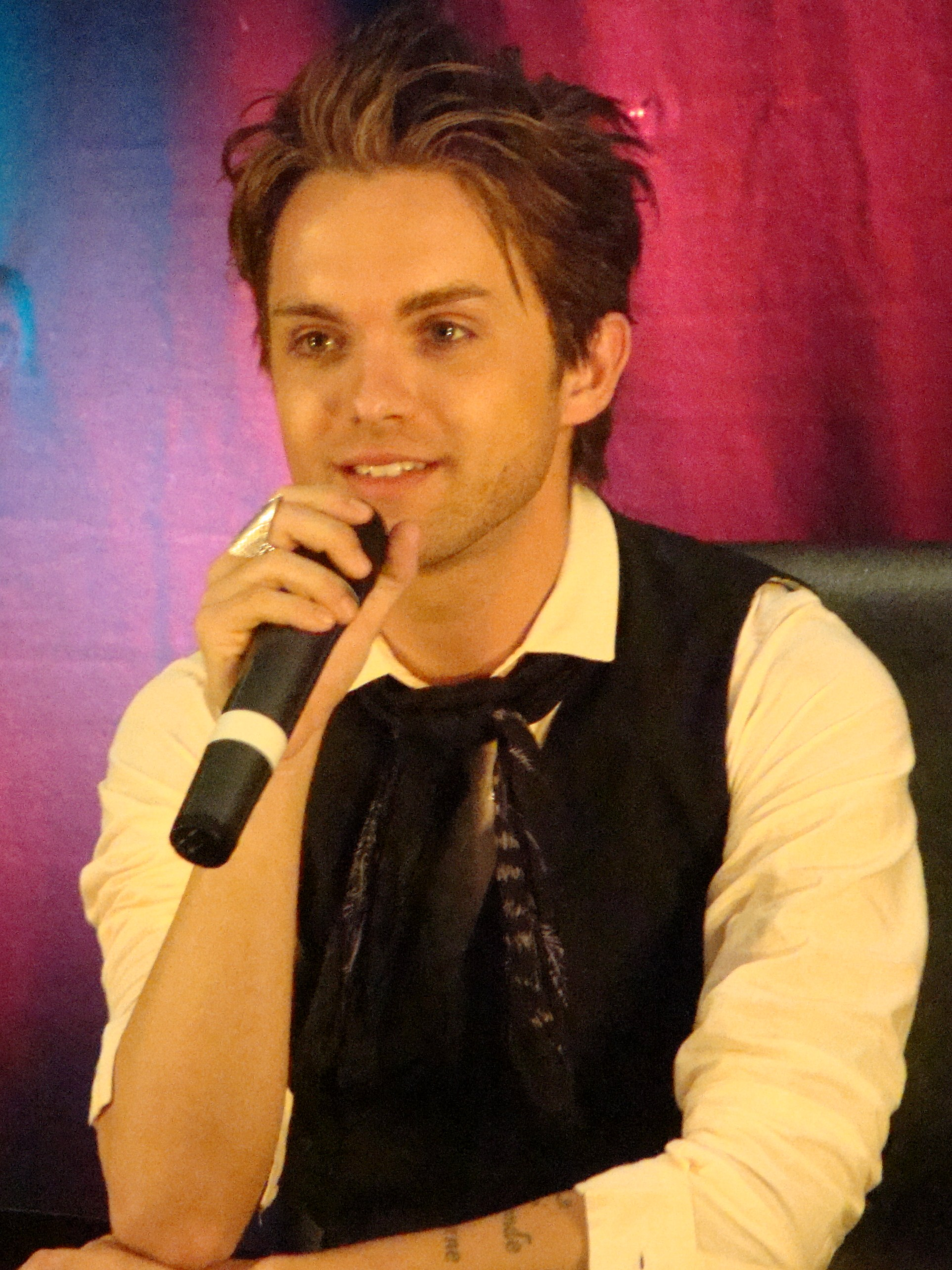
Thomas Dekker

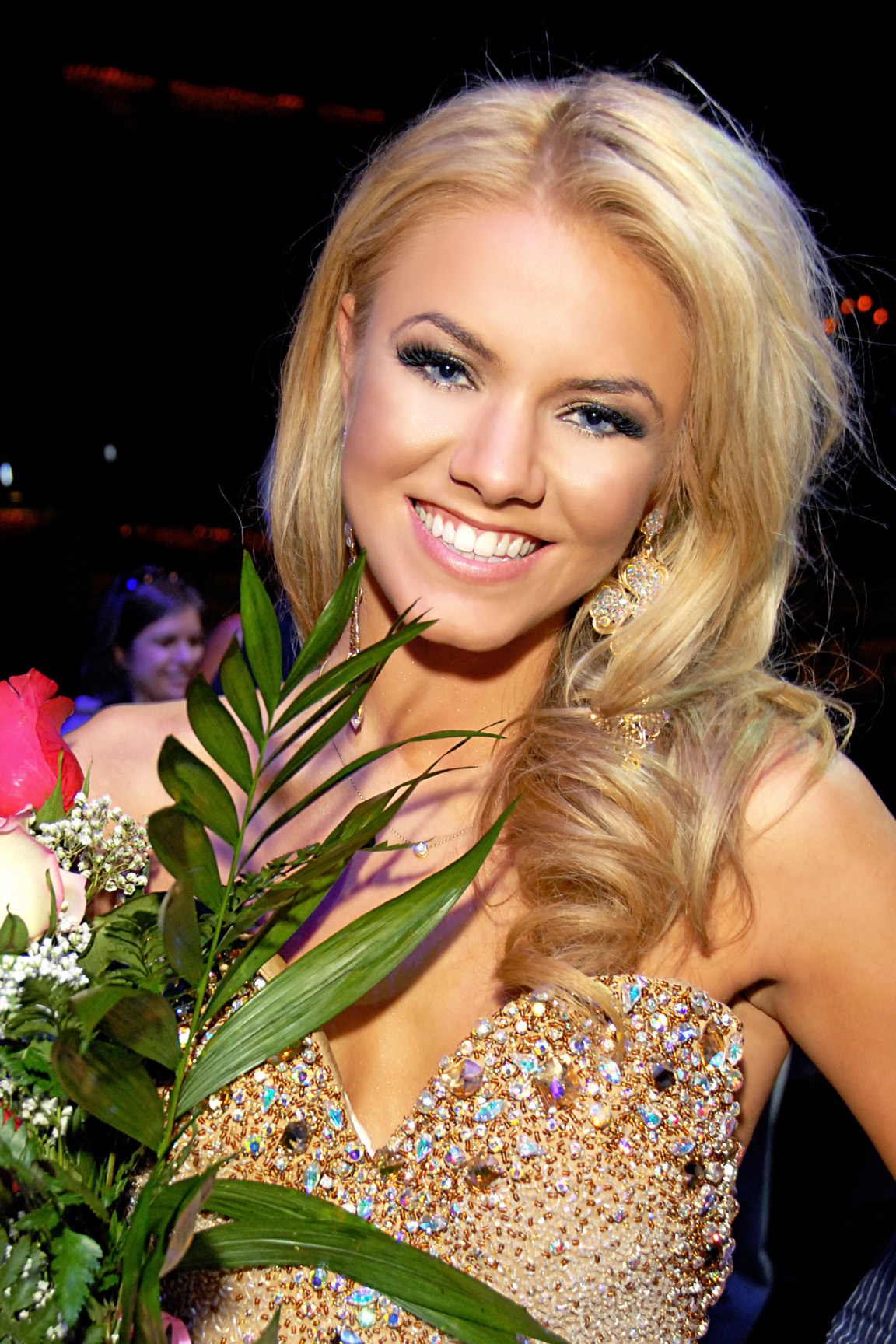
Katie Blair

- December 1 – Jill Costello, activist (d. 2010)
- December 2
  - Jake Ballard, football player
  - Jeremy Beal, football player
  - Mary Hill Fulstone (1892–1987), physician
  - Teairra Marí, singer
- December 3
  - Michael Angarano, actor
  - Eric Barone, video game designer known professionally as ConcernedApe
  - Dustin Belt, guitarist, music producer, and actor
  - Alicia Sacramone, Olympic gymnast
- December 4
  - Orlando Brown, actor and rapper
  - Fan 3, rapper, singer, producer, and actress
  - Dree Hemingway, model and actress
- December 6
  - Jack DeSena, actor and voice actor
- December 7
  - A. C. H., wrestler
  - Aaron Carter, actor and singer (d. 2022)
  - Manting Chan, singer/songwriter
  - Michael Chiesa, mixed martial artist
  - Cara Cunningham, internet personality, songwriter, recording artist, YouTuber, and former pornographic film actress
- December 8
  - Danny Batten, football player
  - Pinky Cole, restaurateur
  - Aria Curzon, actress
- December 9
  - Andre Akpan, soccer player
  - Buddy Baumann, baseball player
  - Hikaru Nakamura, chess grandmaster
  - Kountry Wayne, comedian
- December 10 – David Carter, football player
- December 11
  - Gabe Amo, politician
  - Clifton Geathers, football player
- December 13 – Brett Brackett, football player
- December 14
  - Nate Collins, football player
  - Alex Gaskarth, English-born singer/songwriter, guitarist and frontman for All Time Low
- December 15
  - Scott Copeland, baseball player
  - Josh Norman, football player
- December 16
  - Nick Additon, baseball player
  - Hallee Hirsh, actress
- December 17 – Chelsea Manning, whistleblower
- December 18
  - Solomon Bozeman, basketball player and coach
  - Rex Brothers, baseball player
- December 19
  - Ryan Anderson, basketball player
  - Darrion Caldwell, mixed martial artist
  - Keith Carlos, football player
  - Tyron Carrier, football player
  - Ronan Farrow, activist
- December 20
  - Lola Blanc, singer/songwriter, director, writer, and actress
  - Alana Grace, singer and actress
- December 21
  - Brandon Banks, American-born Canadian football player
  - Baron Batch, football player and entrepreneur
  - Rick Boogs, fitness personality and wrestler
- December 22 – Zack Britton, baseball player
- December 23 – James Brewer, football player
- December 25
  - Charlie Buhler, director, photographer, and producer
  - Ned Cameron, producer and singer/songwriter
  - Demaryius Thomas, football player (d. 2021)
- December 26
  - Karen Alzate, politician
  - Sean Bedford, football player
  - Jeff Cosgriff, soccer player
- December 27 – Andy Leavine, wrestler
- December 28
  - Vince Agnew, football player
  - Taylor Ball, actor
  - Demecus Beach, rugby player
  - Thomas Dekker, actor
  - Adam Gregory, actor
- December 29
  - Katie Blair, actress, model and beauty queen
  - Major Culbert, football player
- December 30
  - Mykel Benson, football player
  - Jason Bohannon, basketball player
  - Jake Cuenca, actor and model
- December 31 – Javaris Crittenton, basketball player

=== Full date unknown ===
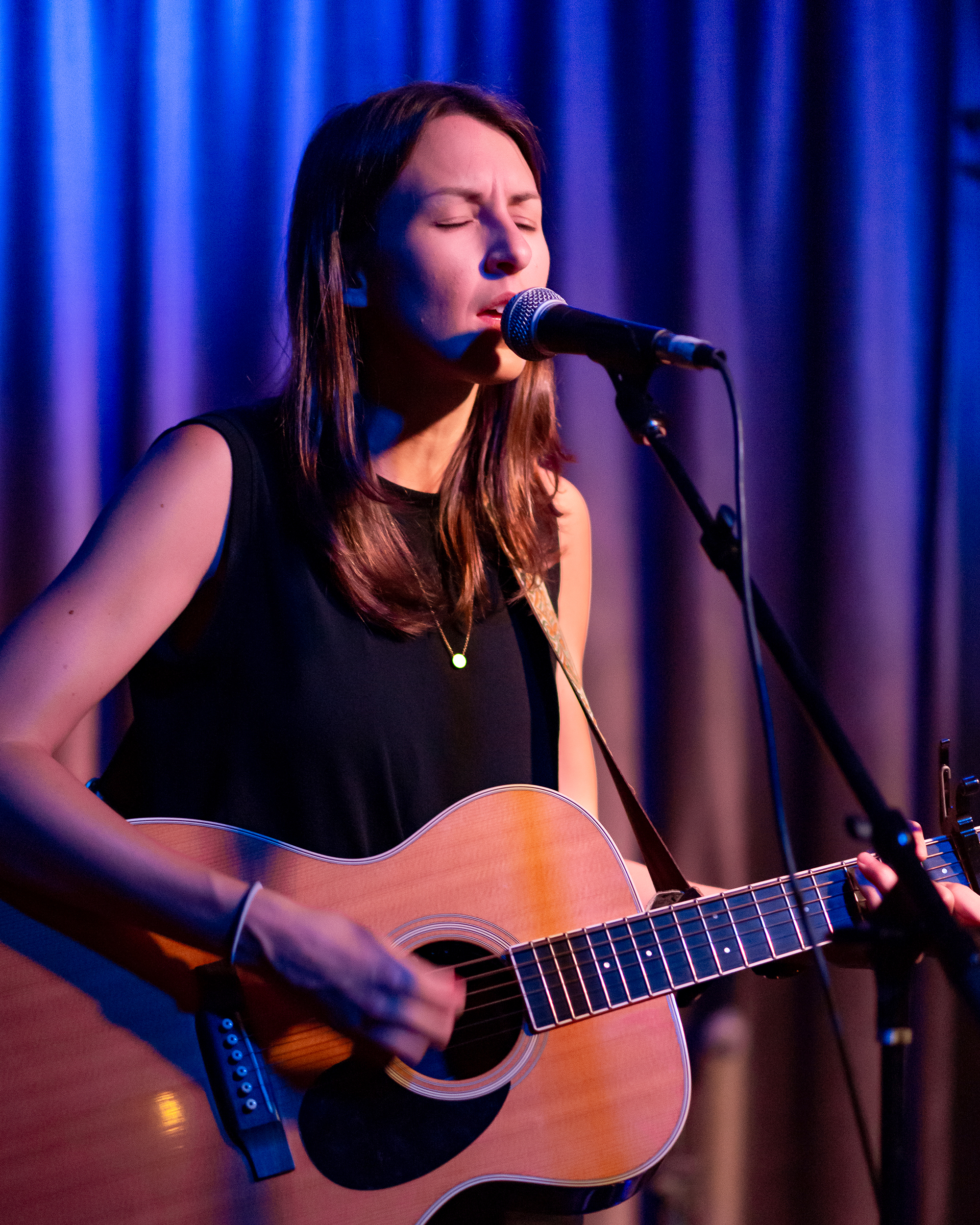
Brooke Annibale

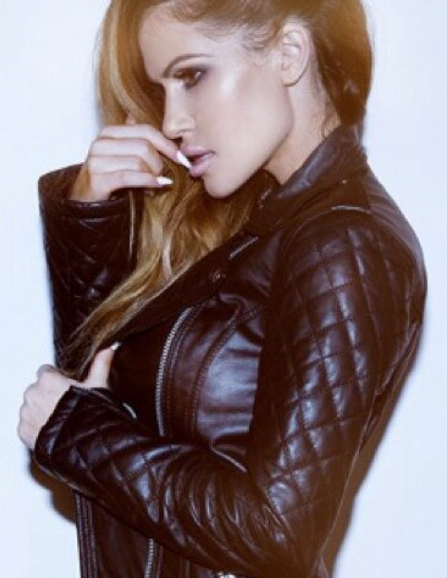
Kimberly Cole

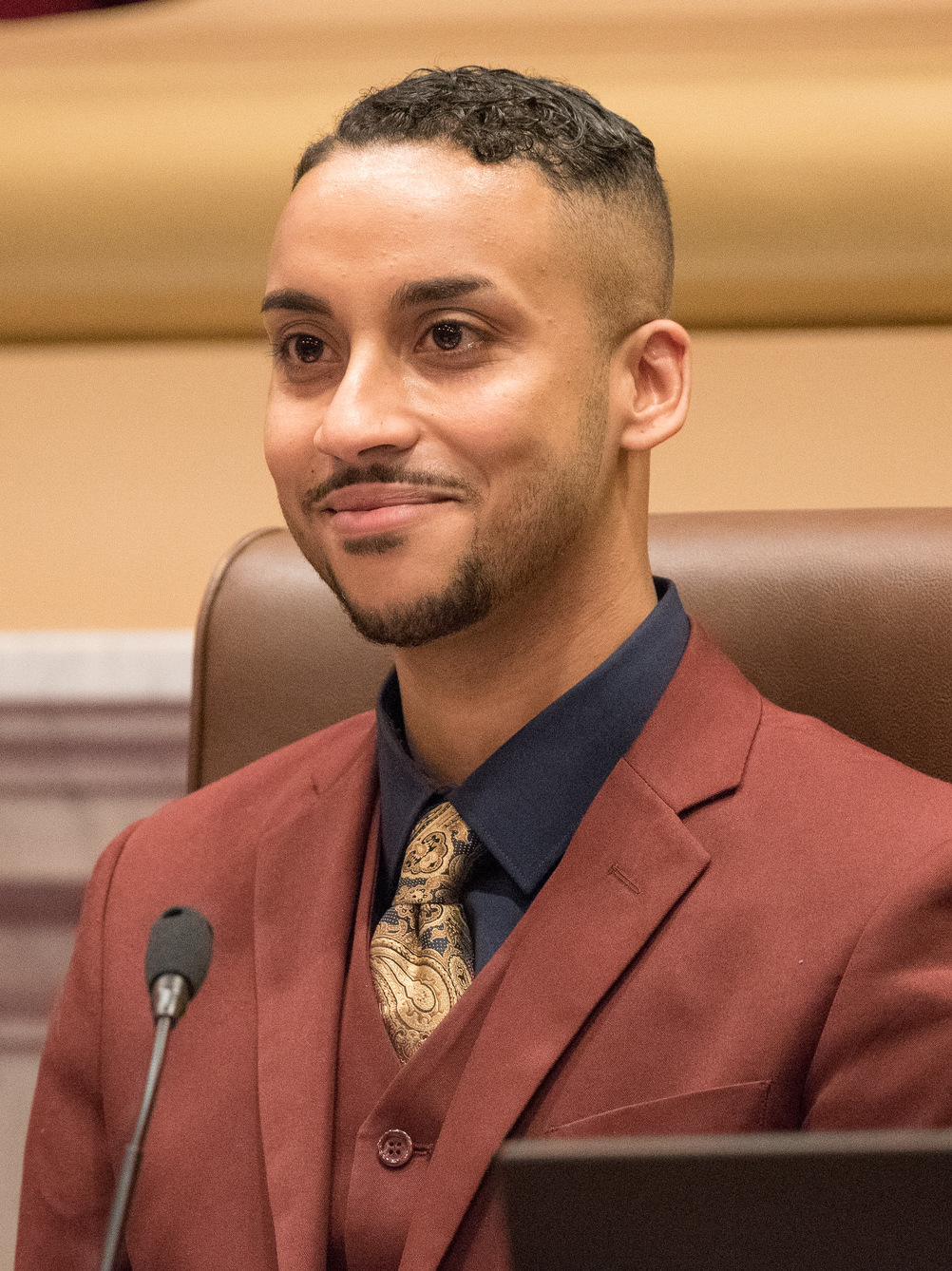
Phillipe Cunningham

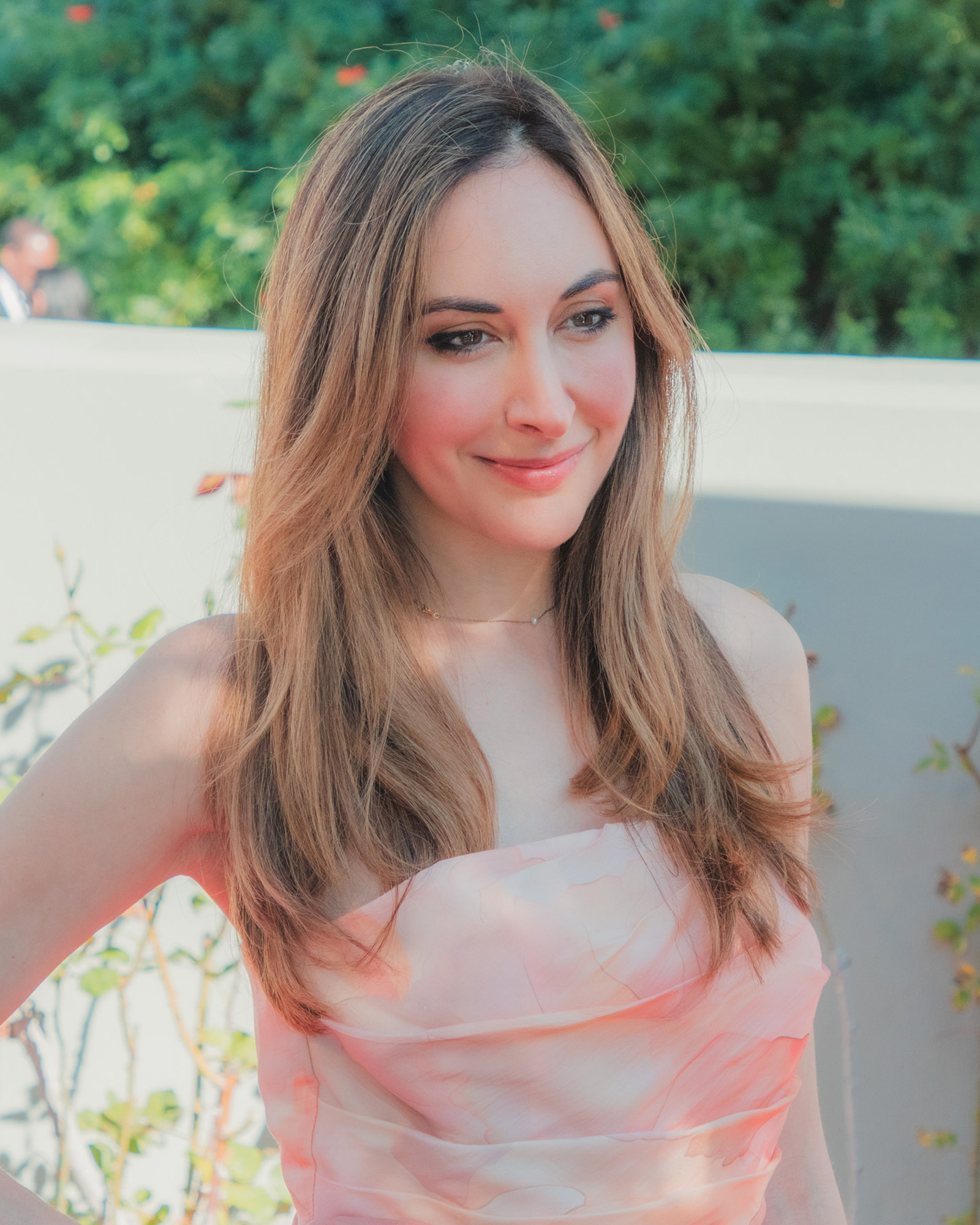
Sarah Natochenny

- Josh Adams, comic book and commercial artist
- Brooke Annibale, singer/songwriter
- Katherine Arden, novelist
- Brandon Stirling Baker, lighting designer
- Andrew Bayer, DJ and music producer
- Jeremy Blackman, actor and musician
- Kenneth Bogner, politician
- Mia Borders, singer/songwriter
- Kent Brantly, doctor
- Ashley Bratcher, actress
- Leigh Brooklyn, figurative artist
- Michael Brown, pianist and composer
- Rembert Browne, writer
- Tim Bueler, media and political consultant
- Aisha Burns, singer/songwriter and violinist
- Emily Calandrelli, science communicator, MIT engineer, and host and executive producer of Xploration Outer Space and Emily's Wonder Lab
- Yvanna Cancela, politician
- Caitlin Cherry, painter, sculptor, and educator
- Lauren Chief Elk, feminist educator and writer
- Tracy Chou, software engineer and advocate for diversity in technology related fields
- Vivian Chu, roboticist and entrepreneur
- Ken Clausen, lacrosse player
- Dave Clauss, recording and mixing engineer
- Ashley Connor, cinematographer
- Alexandra Crandell, model and television personality
- Phillipe Cunningham, politician
- Michelle Curran, Air Force major and pilot
- Shaghayegh Cyrous, Iranian-born artist and curator
- Sarah Natochenny, voice actress

== Deaths ==
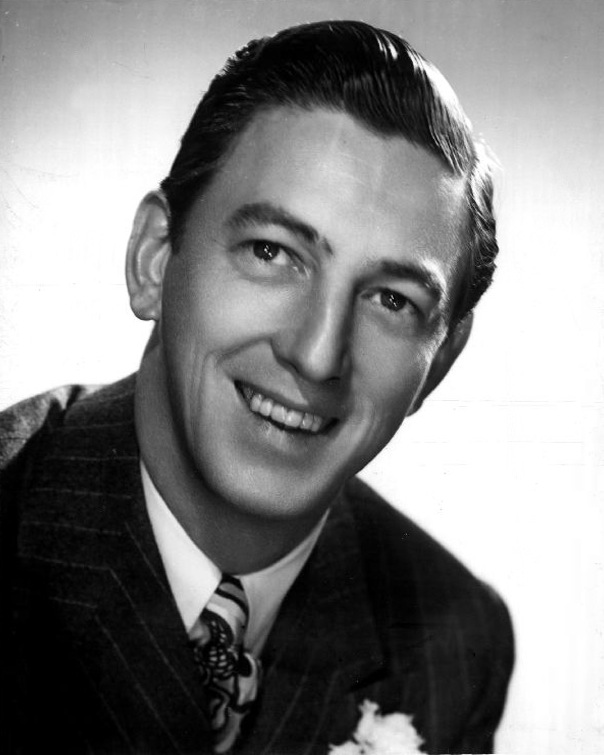
Ray Bolger

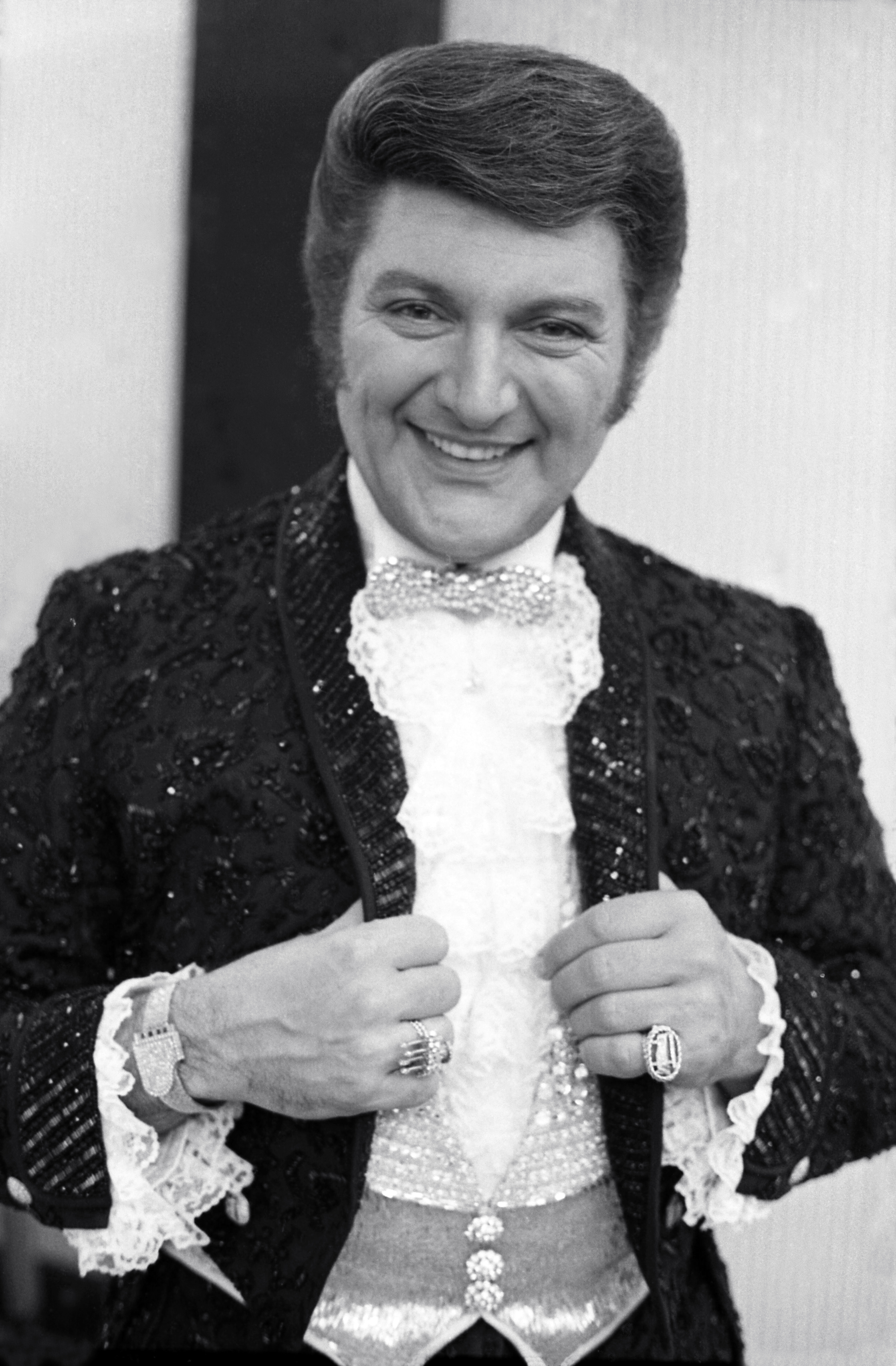
Liberace

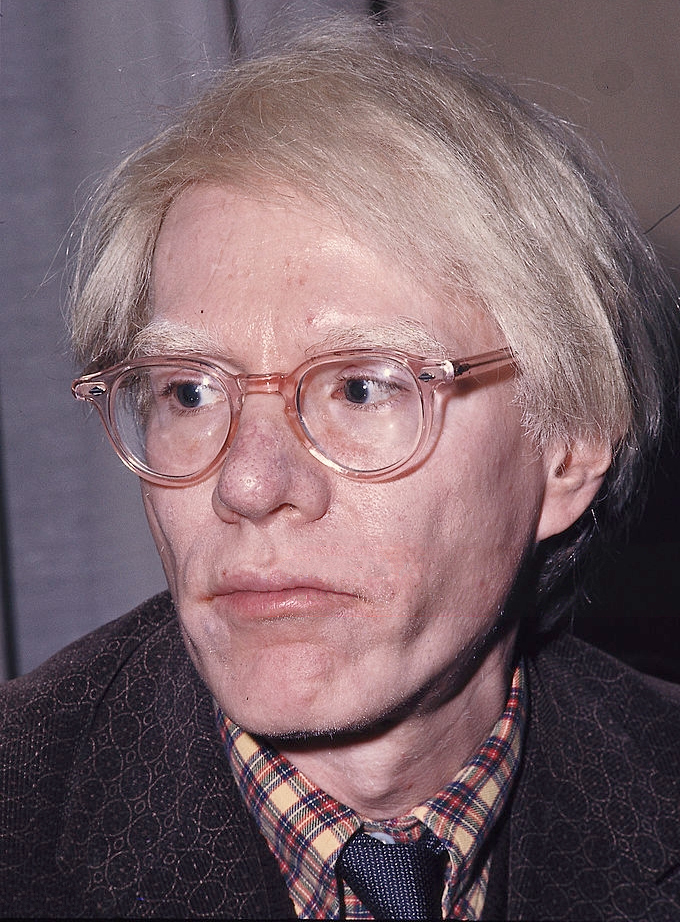
Andy Warhol

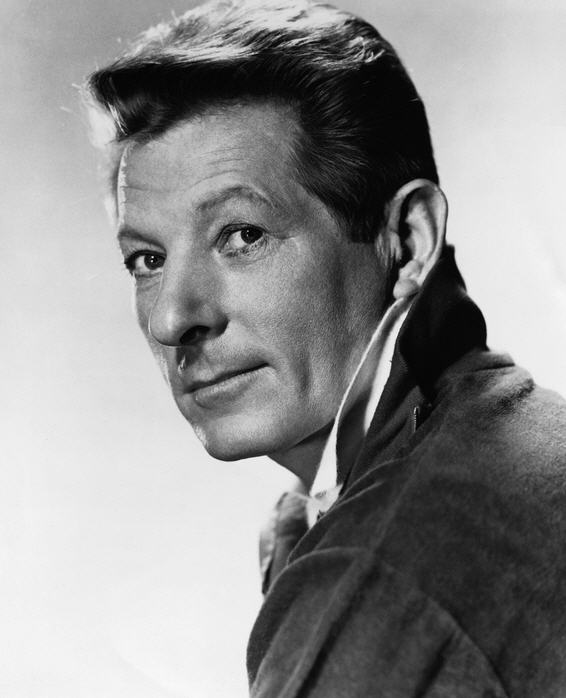
Danny Kaye

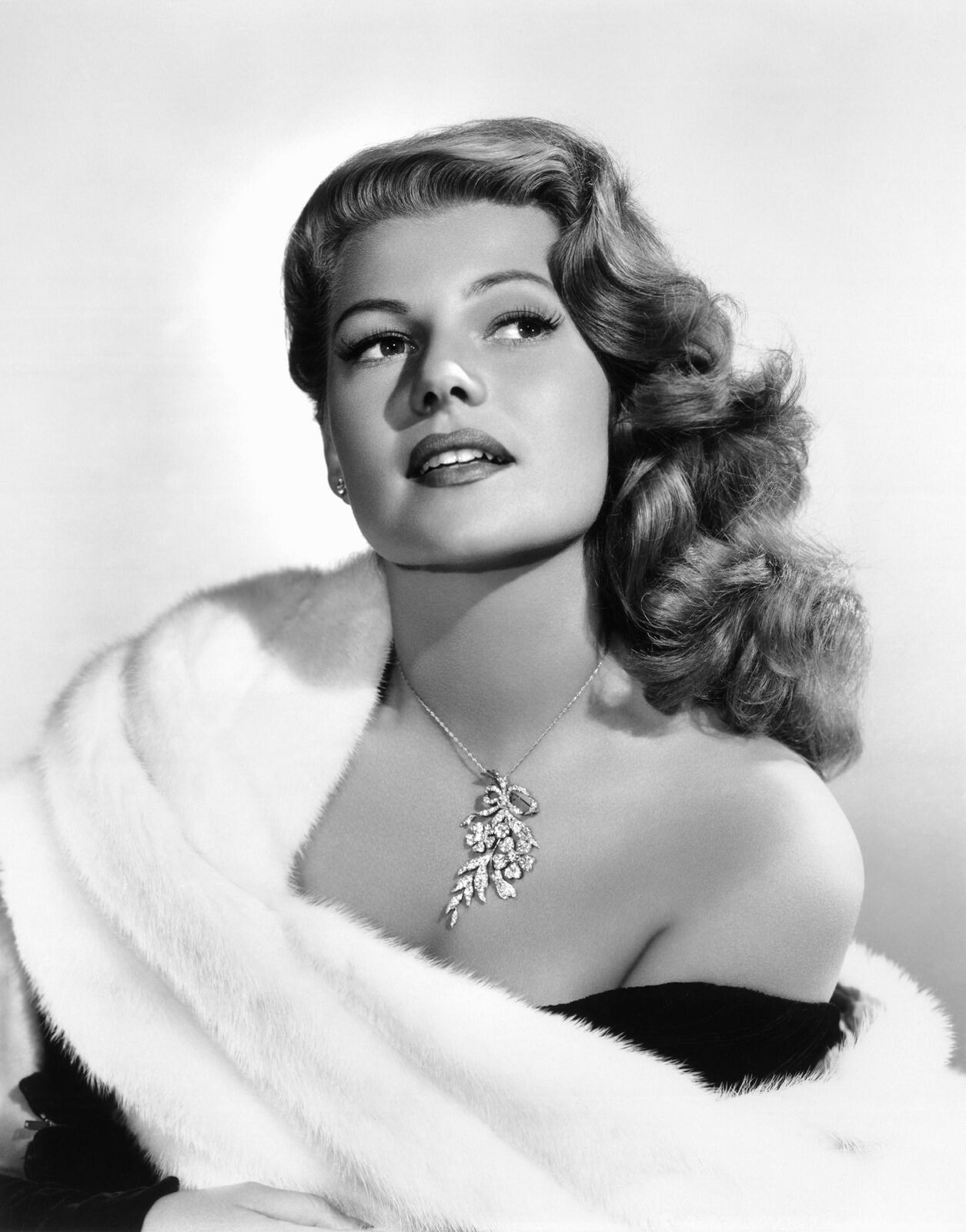
Rita Hayworth

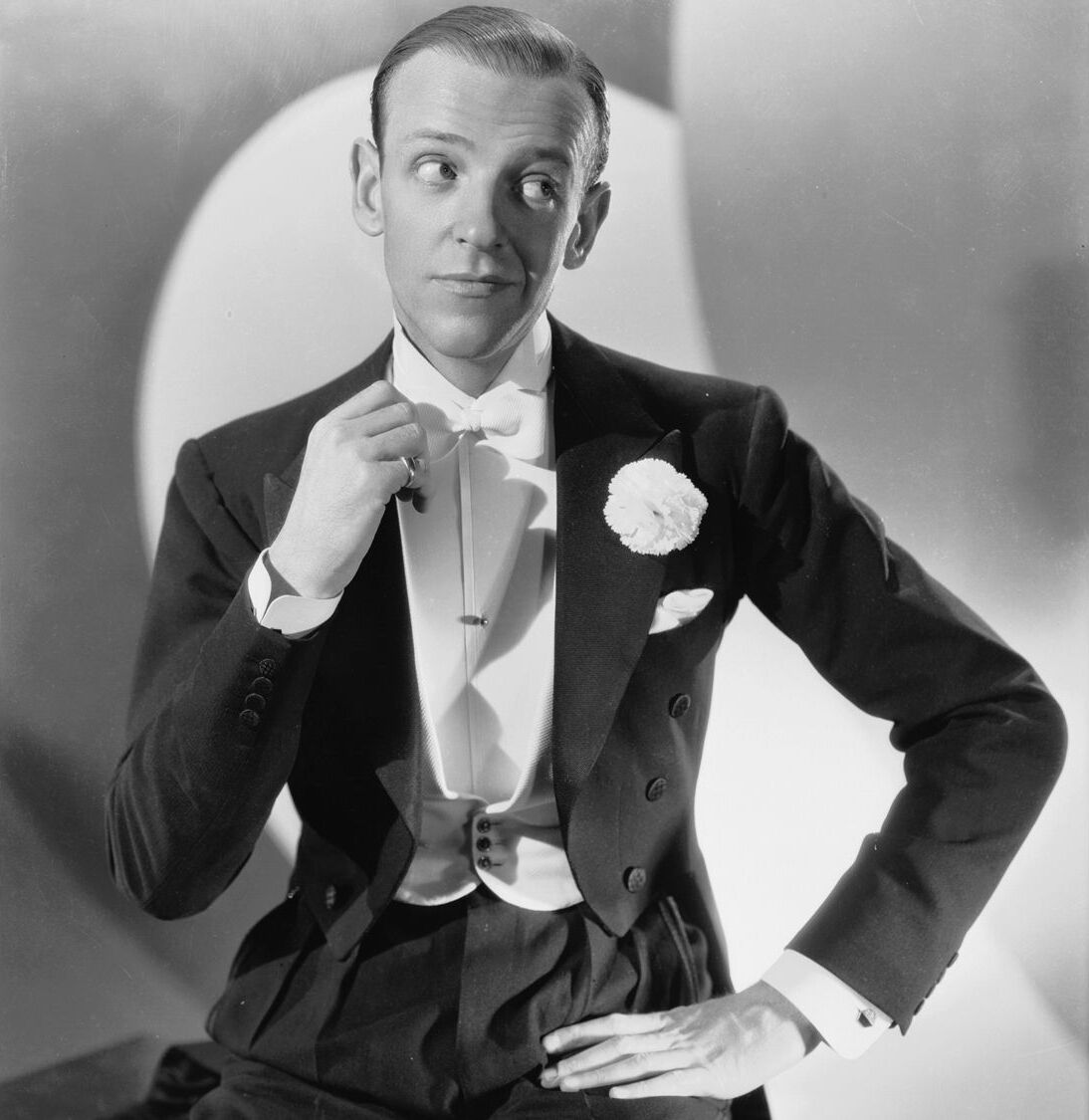
Fred Astaire

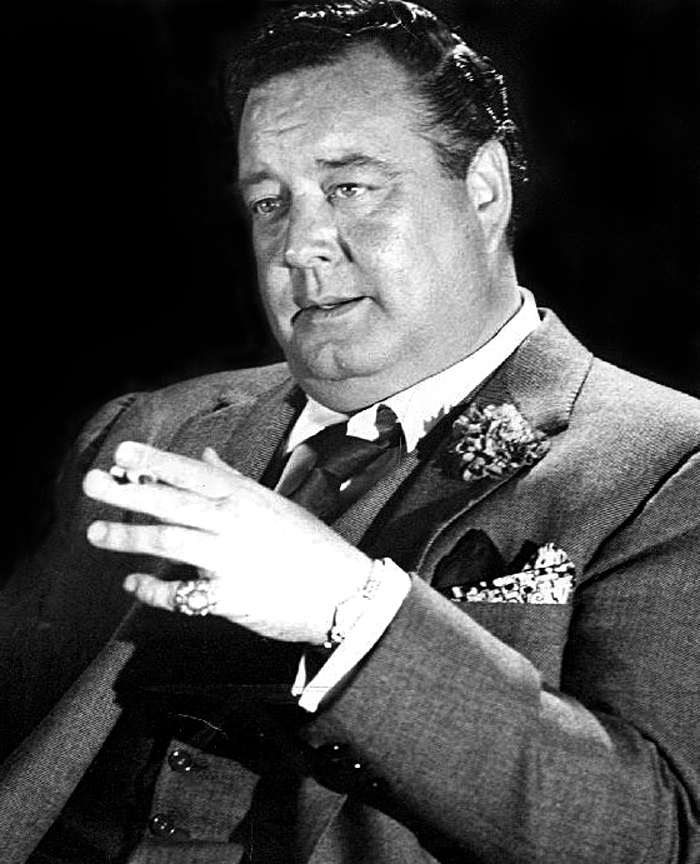
Jackie Gleason

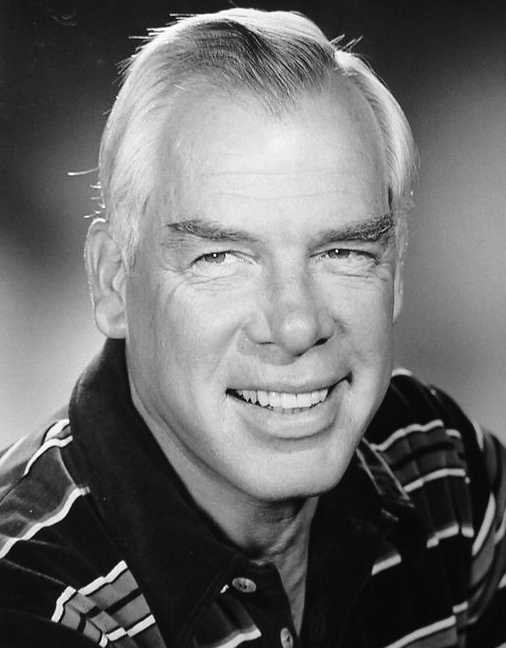
Lee Marvin

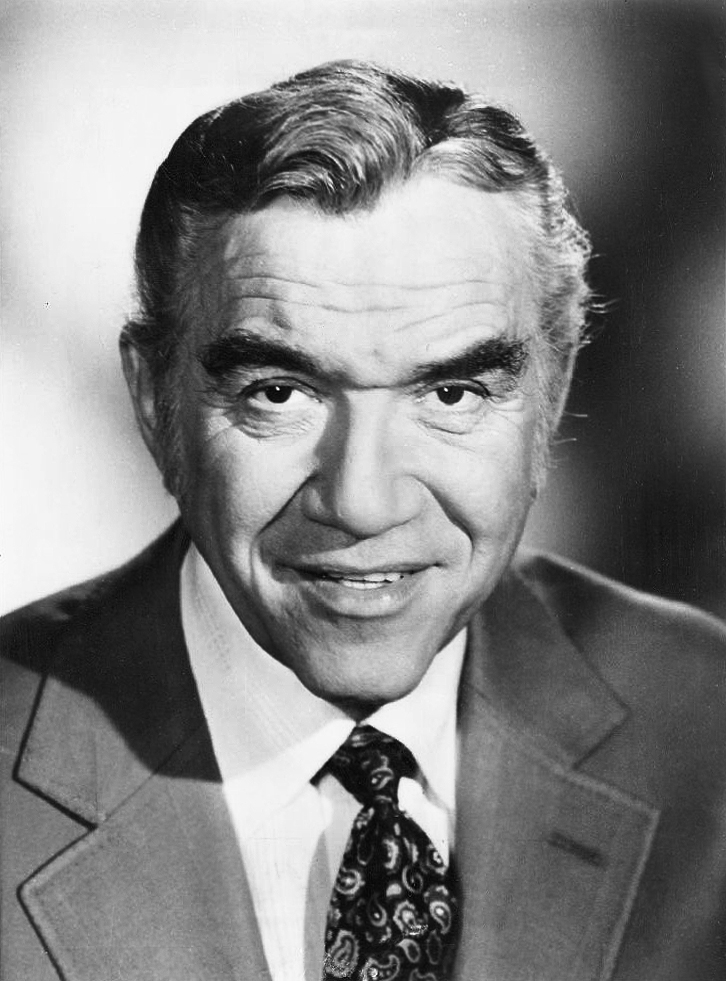
Lorne Greene

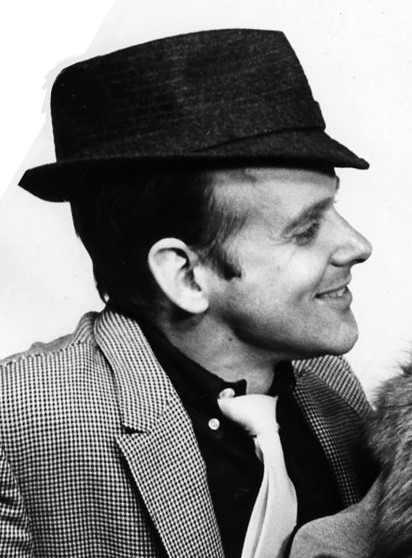
Bob Fosse

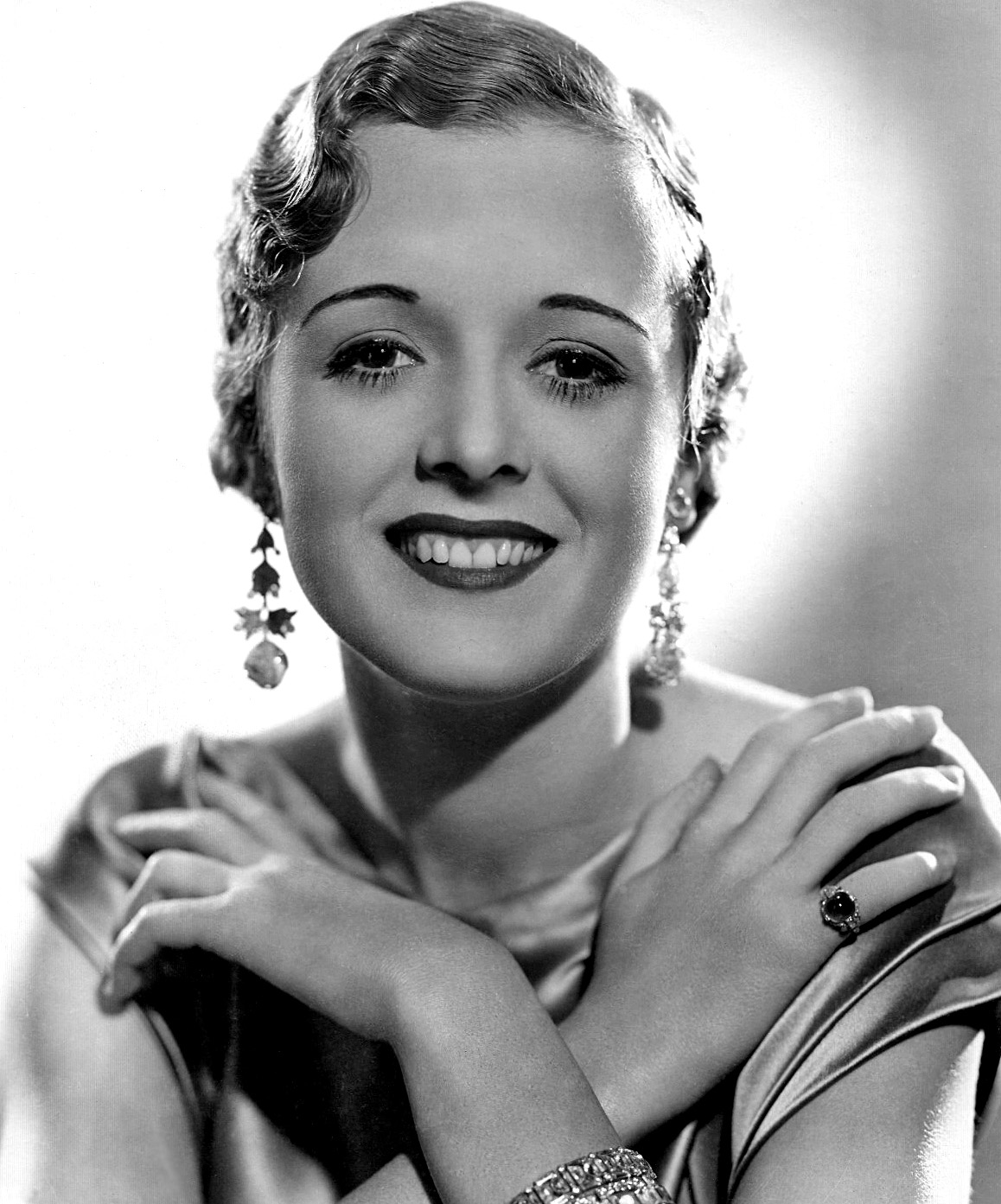
Mary Astor

- January 1 – Lloyd Haynes, actor (born 1934)
- January 13 – Taddy Aycock, politician, 45th Lieutenant Governor of Louisiana (born 1915)
- January 14 – Sam Wagstaff, art curator and collector (born 1921)
- January 15 – Ray Bolger, actor, singer and dancer, Scarecrow in The Wizard of Oz (born 1904)
- January 16 – Joyce Jameson, actress (born 1932)
- January 22 – R. Budd Dwyer, 70th State Treasurer of the Commonwealth of Pennsylvania (born 1939)
- February – Lou Darvas, artist and cartoonist (born 1913)
- February 4 – Liberace, pianist, singer, and actor (born 1919)
- February 5
  - E. Michael Burke, sports executive, naval officer and CIA agent (born 1916)
  - William Collier Jr., actor (born 1902)
- February 22
  - David Susskind, producer and talk show host (born 1920)
  - Andy Warhol, leading figure in the visual art movement pop art, (born 1928)
- February 25 – James Coco, actor (born 1930)
- March 1 – Freddie Green, jazz musician (born 1911)
- March 2 – Randolph Scott, actor (born 1898)
- March 3 – Danny Kaye, singer, actor, and comedian (born 1911)
- March 18 – Bil Baird, puppeteer (born 1904)
- March 21
  - Dean Paul Martin, actor, (born 1951)
  - Robert Preston, actor and singer (born 1918)
- March 22 – Joan Shawlee, actress (born 1926)
- March 26 – Walter Abel, actor (born 1898)
- March 28
  - Patrick Troughton, English actor (born 1920)
  - Maria von Trapp, Matriarch of the Trapp Family Singers (born 1905)
- April 1 – Victor D'Amico, teaching artist, Director of the Department of Education of the Museum of Modern Art (born 1904)
- April 2 – Buddy Rich, drummer, songwriter, conductor, and bandleader (born 1917)
- April 11
  - Manny S. Brown, politician, member of the Wisconsin State Assembly (born 1917)
  - Kent Taylor, screen actor (born 1906)
- April 12 – Mike Von Erich, professional wrestler (born 1964)
- April 17
  - Dick Shawn, actor and comedian (born 1923)
  - Willi Smith, fashion designer (born 1948)
- April 19
  - Hugh Brannum, composer, vocalist, and actor (born 1910)
  - Milt Kahl, animator (born 1909)
- April 26 – Bill Amos, college football player and coach (born 1898)
- May – John Pierotti, cartoonist (born 1911)
- May 4 – Paul Butterfield, blues harmonica player (born 1942)
- May 5 – Phil Woolpert, basketball coach (born 1915)
- May 6 – William J. Casey, Director of the C.I.A. from 1981 to 1987 (born 1913)
- May 13 – Richard Ellmann, literary critic and biographer (born 1918)
- May 14 – Rita Hayworth, actress (born 1918)
- May 21 – Alejandro Rey, Argentine-American actor and television director (born 1930)
- May 24 – Hermione Gingold, English actress (born 1897)
- May 28 – Charles Ludlam, actor, director, and playwright (born 1943)
- June 2 – Sammy Kaye, bandleader and songwriter (born 1910)
- June 3 – Will Sampson, Muscogee Nation painter, actor, and rodeo performer (born 1933)
- June 10 – Elizabeth Hartman, actress (born 1943)
- June 13 – Geraldine Page, actress (born 1924)
- June 17 – Dick Howser, baseball player and manager (born 1936)
- June 22 – Fred Astaire, dancer, singer, and actor (born 1899)
- June 24 – Jackie Gleason, actor, comedian, and writer (born 1916)
- June 27 – Althea Flynt, model and publisher (born 1953)
- June 25 – Boudleaux Bryant, American songwriter (born 1920)
- July 2 – Michael Bennett, musical theatre director, writer, choreographer, and dancer (born 1943)
- July 11 – Joe Bennett, baseball player (born 1900)
- July 29 – Arthur J. Bressan Jr., American filmmaker and writer (born 1943)
- August 10 – Casey Donovan, American pornographic actor (born 1943)
- August 11 – Clara Peller, Russian-born television personality (born 1902)
- August 14 – Edgar Rosenberg, German-born British television producer (born 1925)
- August 19 – Hayden Rorke, actor (born 1910)
- August 24 – Bayard Rustin, African American civil rights activist (born 1912)
- August 27 – Scott La Rock, American disc jockey (born 1962)
- August 28 – John Huston, filmmaker and actor (born 1906)
- August 29 – Lee Marvin, actor (born 1924)
- September 3 – Rusty Wescoatt, actor (born 1911)
- September 5 – Quinn Martin, television producer (born 1922)
- September 11 – Lorne Greene, Canadian actor and musician (born 1915)
- September 21 – Jaco Pastorius, American musician and producer (born 1951)
- September 22 – Dan Rowan, actor (born 1922)
- September 23 – Bob Fosse, actor, choreographer, dancer, and director (born 1927)
- September 25 – Mary Astor, actress (born 1906)
- September 29 – Henry Ford II, chairman, CEO & president of the Ford Motor Company (born 1917)
- October 9 – Clare Boothe Luce, writer, politician, and U.S. ambassador (born 1903)
- October 12
  - Snake Henry, baseball player (born 1895)
  - Alf Landon, 1936 Republican presidential nominee (born 1887)
- October 18 – Pete Carpenter, musician and arranger (born 1914)
- October 29 – Woody Herman, jazz musician and bandleader (born 1913)
- November 2 – Claude J. Jasper, Wisconsin politician (born 1905/1906)
- November 10 – Jackie Vernon, comedian and actor (born 1924)
- November 22 – W. Haydon Burns, 35th Governor of Florida (born 1912)
- November 28 – Goo Choo San, Singaporean dancer and choreographer (b. 1948)
- December 1 – James Baldwin, author and civil rights activist (born 1924)
- December 4 – Arnold Lobel, children's book author (born 1933)
- December 4 – Rouben Mamoulian, film and theatre director (born 1897 in Russia)
- December 5 – Molly O'Day, country singer (born 1923)
- December 8 – Fay Baker, actress and writer (born 1917)
- December 10
  - Harrell F. Beck, preacher, professor, and academic (born 1922)
  - Jascha Heifetz, Russian-born American violinist (born 1901)
- December 11 – George Harold Brown, research engineer (born 1908)
- December 13 – Bil Dwyer, cartoonist and humorist (born 1907)
- December 17 – Linda Wong, American pornographic actress (born 1951)
- December 21
  - Ralph Nelson, film and television director, producer, writer, and actor (born 1916)
  - Robert Paige, actor (born 1911)

== See also ==
- 1987 in American television
- List of American films of 1987
- Timeline of United States history (1970–1989)
