= Deaths in March 1990 =

The following is a list of notable deaths in March 1990.

Entries for each day are listed alphabetically by surname. A typical entry lists information in the following sequence:

- Name, age, country of citizenship at birth, subsequent country of citizenship (if applicable), reason for notability, cause of death (if known), and reference.

== March 1990 ==
=== 1 ===
- Desmond Brain, 80, Australian cricketer.
- Max Bulla, 84, Austrian racing cyclist.
- Frank Crespi, 72, American baseball player (St. Louis Cardinals).
- Ben Hill Griffin, Jr., 79, American businessman and politician.
- Dainin Katagiri, 62, Japanese-American Zen master, cancer.
- Frederick Landis Jr., 78, American judge.

=== 2 ===
- Arthur Fleischmann, 93, Czech-British sculptor.
- Shakey Jake Harris, 68, American musician.
- Reg Saunders, 69, Aboriginal Australian Army officer.
- Shin Shalom, 85, Israeli writer.

=== 3 ===
- Roberto Bertol, 72, Spanish football player.
- Gérard Blitz, 78, Belgian entrepreneur.
- William D. Dunham, 70, American general and flying ace during World War II.
- Frans Goedhart, 86, Dutch politician and journalist.
- Risto Mattila, 80, Finnish Olympic sprinter (1928).
- David Nolting, 85, Argentine Olympic rower (1924).
- Louis Page, 84, French cinematographer.
- Charlotte Moore Sitterly, 91, American astronomer, heart failure.
- Lockie Wood, 85, Australian rules footballer.

=== 4 ===
- Abraham Bernstein, 71, American politician.
- Hank Gathers, 23, American basketball player, ventricular tachycardia.
- Konstantin Konstantinovich Kokkinaki, 79, Soviet fighter and test pilot.
- Vasily Margelov, 81, Soviet general.
- Frank McGrath, 85, American football player (Frankford Yellow Jackets).
- Heinz Schnackertz, 78, German cinematographer.
- Harry Worthington, 98, American Olympic track and field athlete (1912).

=== 5 ===
- Albano, 67, Portuguese footballer.
- Stanley Barnes, 89, American college football player and circuit judge (United States Court of Appeals for the Ninth Circuit).
- Edmund Conen, 75, German football player.
- Mala, 47, Pakistani singer.
- Timothy Mason, 50, English marxist historian of Nazi Germany, suicide.
- Gary Merrill, 74, American actor (All About Eve), lung cancer.
- Hans Christian Nielsen, 61, Danish Olympic footballer (1960).
- Gina Pane, 50, French artist.
- Gloria Carter Spann, 63, American motorcyclist, sister of Jimmy Carter, pancreatic cancer.
- Peter Adolf Thiessen, 90, German chemist.
- Karel Thijs, 71, Belgian racing cyclist.
- William Appleman Williams, 68, American historian.

=== 6 ===
- Mario Aguilar, 64, Salvadorian Olympic sailor (1968).
- Friedrich Hielscher, 87, German theologian.
- Taro Kagawa, 67, Japanese footballer.
- E. T. Klassen, 81, United States Postmaster General.
- Egill Knutzen, 75, Norwegian Olympic fencer (1936, 1948, 1952).
- Adam Papée, 94, Polish fencer and Olympic medalist (1924, 1928, 1932, 1936).
- William Raborn, 84, American intelligence officer, Director of Central Intelligence (1965–1966).
- Joe Sewell, 91, American Hall of Fame baseball player (Cleveland Indians, New York Yankees).
- Julian Spence, 60, American football player (Chicago Cardinals, San Francisco 49ers, Houston Oilers).
- Earl T. Wagner, 81, American politician, member of the U.S. House of Representatives (1949–1951).

=== 7 ===
- Claude Arrieu, 86, French composer.
- Shuddhananda Bharati, 92, Indian religious philosopher.
- Shenork I Kaloustian, 76, Soviet Armenian Patriarch of Constantinople (since 1963).
- Pancho Córdova, 73, Mexican actor, screenwriter and film director.
- Çetin Emeç, 54–55, Turkish journalist, shot.
- Ruth Glass, 77, German-British sociologist and urban planner.
- Mordecai Gorelik, 90, Russian-American theatrical designer, cancer.
- Atanasia Ionescu, 54, Romanian gymnast and Olympian (1960, 1964).
- Jay Lovestone, 92, Russian-American political activist.
- Luís Carlos Prestes, 92, Brazilian politician, heart attack.
- Jacobus Gideon Nel Strauss, 89, South African politician.
- Salvatore Tripoli, 85, American boxer and Olympic medalist (1924).
- Mihály Tóth, 63, Hungarian football player.
- Carl A. Wirtanen, 79, American astronomer.

=== 8 ===
- Erkki Aaltonen, 79, Finnish composer.
- Erich Hohagen, 75, German general and flying ace during World War II.
- Karin Kavli, 83, Swedish actress.
- Charles Krüger, 93, Luxembourgish Olympic football player (1920).
- Jack Lindsay, 89, Australian-British writer.
- Lou Possner, 72, American basketball player.
- John Ben Shepperd, 74, American politician, cancer.
- Hein van Breenen, 60, Dutch racing cyclist.

=== 9 ===
- Georgios Costakis, 76, Soviet collector of Russian art.
- Abraham Solomon Halkin, 86, Russian-American-Israeli historian, pneumonia.
- Giorgos Joannides, 67, Greek-born American intelligence officer.
- Martial Singher, 85, French opera singer.
- Isao Sato, 40, Japanese theater actor, plane crash.
- Lou Vedder, 92, American baseball and football player (Detroit Tigers).

=== 10 ===
- Tseng Kwong Chi, 39, Hong Kong-American photographer, AIDS.
- B. R. Deodhar, 88, Indian singer.
- Michael Stewart, Baron Stewart of Fulham, 83, British politician.
- Pat McDonald, 68, Australian actress, pancreatic cancer.
- Giovanni Paganin, 34, Italian Olympic speed skater (1980).
- Harro Ran, 52, Dutch Olympic water polo player (1960, 1964)
- Otto Schuhart, 80, German U-boat commander during War II.
- Darbara Singh, 74, Indian politician.
- Lance Tingay, 74, British sports journalist, heart attack.
- Reg Wright, 84, Australian politician.

=== 11 ===
- Dan Archibong, 46, Nigerian soldier and politician, traffic collision.
- Muriel Dickson, 86, Scottish soprano.
- Cornelis Dusseldorp, 81, Dutch Olympic rower (1928).
- Pratul Chandra Gupta, 80, Indian historian.
- Dean Horrix, 28, English footballer, traffic collision.
- Håkon Kindervåg, 67, Norwegian footballer.
- Edward Partin, 66, American trade unionist.
- Oronzo Pugliese, 79, Italian football manager.
- Roy Schalk, 81, American baseball player (New York Yankees, Chicago White Sox).

=== 12 ===
- Bruce Barnes, 80, American tennis player.
- Rie de Balbian Verster-Bolderheij, 100, Dutch painter.
- Wallace Breem, 63, British author.
- Lamberto Cesari, 79, Italian-American mathematician.
- Jane Grigson, 61, English cookbook writer, cervical cancer.
- Eugene V. Klein, 69, American businessman.
- Rick Lackman, 79, American football player (Philadelphia Eagles).
- Rosamond Lehmann, 89, English novelist.
- Walter Orr Roberts, 74, American atmospheric scientist and astronomer, cancer.
- Alf Sherwood, 66, Welsh footballer, heart attack.
- Philippe Soupault, 92, French writer.
- Harry South, 60, English musician.

=== 13 ===
- Bruno Bettelheim, 86, Austrian-American psychologist, suicide by asphyxiation.
- Hugh Cholmondeley, 6th Marquess of Cholmondeley, 70, British hereditary peer.
- Albert De Cleyn, 72, Belgian football player.
- Ernst Goldenbaum, 91, German politician.
- Johan Heijm, 85, Dutch Olympic wrestler (1928).
- Graham Martin, 77, American diplomat.
- Karl Münchinger, 74, German conductor.
- Irina Aleksandrovna Ovtchinnikova, 85, Russian-British anthropologist.
- Gottfried Weimann, 82, German Olympic javelin thrower (1932, 1936).

=== 14 ===
- Robert H. Bahmer, 85, American archivist.
- Wilhelm Baumann, 77, German Olympic handball player (1936).
- Pete Close, 52, American Olympic runner (1960).
- Richard Cooper, 44, English cricketer.
- Harold Medina, 102, American judge.
- Yuri Sokolov, 29, Soviet Olympic judoka (1988) and criminal, killed.
- Aubrey Wisberg, 80, British-American filmmaker, cancer.

=== 15 ===
- Farzad Bazoft, 31, Iranian-British journalist and alleged spy, execution by hanging.
- José Antonio Bottiroli, 70, Argentine composer.
- Jim Ede, 94, British art collector.
- Loleta Fyan, 95, American librarian.
- Tom Harmon, 70, American football player.
- Mykola Makhynia, 77, Soviet and Ukrainian football player and coach.
- Angus Scott, 62, British Olympic athlete (1952).
- Mike Witteck, 26, American football player (New York Jets).

=== 16 ===
- Ernst Bacon, 91, American composer.
- Harry Oliver Bradley, 60, Canadian politician, member of the House of Commons of Canada (1962-1963).
- Wolfgang Clemen, 81, German literary scholar.
- Fritz Ewert, 53, German footballer.
- Barry French, 68, American football player (Baltimore Colts, Detroit Lions).
- James Frank Gilliam, 75, American classical scholar.

=== 17 ===
- Capucine, 62, French model and actress (The Pink Panther, What's New Pussycat?), suicide by jumping.
- Samuel H. Friedman, 93, American journalist and labor union activist, pneumonia.
- Ric Grech, 43, British musician, liver failure.
- Nanette Guilford, 86, American opera singer, gastroenteritis.
- Mohamed Latif, 80, Egyptian football player and Olympian (1936).
- Jack Noren, 60, American drummer.
- Rose Marie Pangborn, 57–58, American food scientist, cancer.
- Carmelo Samonà, 64, Italian academic.

=== 18 ===
- Robin Harris, 36, American comedian and actor (House Party, Do the Right Thing, Harlem Nights), heart attack.
- Bob Katter, Sr., 71, Australian politician.
- Charles Phelps Smyth, 95, American chemist.
- Eileen Soper, 84, English artist.
- Zacarias, 56, Brazilian actor.

=== 19 ===
- Oyinkan Abayomi, 93, Nigerian activist.
- Tiny Brauer, 80, American actor.
- James H. R. Cromwell, 93, American diplomat.
- Wilhelm Flügge, 86, German engineer.
- Weldon Gentry, 83, American football player (Providence Steamrollers).
- Leopold Neumer, 71, Austrian football player.
- Oulaya, 53, Tunisian singer and actress.
- Andrew Wood, 24, American singer, heroin overdose.

=== 20 ===
- Jason Boe, 61, American politician.
- Maurice Cloche, 82, French filmmaker, Parkinson's disease.
- Edward Deir, 75, Canadian Olympic canoeist (1936).
- Sir Kenneth Mather, 78, British geneticist, heart attack.
- Wilhelm Neef, 74, German conductor.
- Victor Rothschild, 3rd Baron Rothschild, 79, British banker and intelligence officer.
- Lev Yashin, 60, Soviet footballer and Olympian (1956), stomach cancer.

=== 21 ===
- Sahiuddin Bishwas, 67, Bangladeshi freedom fighter and politician.
- Dessie Cullinane, 70, Irish footballer.
- Ottorino Mancioli, 81, Italian painter.
- Bruce McGregor, 87, Australian rules footballer.
- Allan Roberts, 46, British politician, cancer.
- Edward Wojda, 48, Polish wrestler and Olympian (1968, 1972).
- Rayburn Wright, 67, American trombonist, composer, and conductor, cancer.

=== 22 ===
- Dave Arrell, 76, Australian rules footballer.
- Gerald Bull, 62, Canadian military engineer, shot.
- Maurice Fleuret, 57, French composer.
- Eivind Holmsen, 95, Norwegian Olympic sports shooter (1924).
- Robert Karplus, 63, Austrian-American theoretical physicist.
- Bernardo Jaramillo Ossa, 33, Colombian communist politician, homicide.
- Geoffrey Ostergaard, 63, British political scientist, leukemia.
- Cornelius A. Pickett, 87, American politician.

=== 23 ===
- John Dexter, 64, English theatre director.
- René Enríquez, 56, Nicaraguan-American actor, AIDS.
- Margaret Holgerson, 63, American baseball player.
- John Jardine, 54, American gridiron football player, heart condition.
- Al Sears, 80, American saxophonist.
- Leongino Unzaim, 64, Paraguayan football player.

=== 24 ===
- Ray Goulding, 68, American comedian, kidney failure.
- Jennie Lee, 61, American stripteaser, cancer.
- John Louis Morkovsky, 80, American Roman Catholic prelate, stroke.
- Alice Sapritch, 73, French actress, cancer.
- An Wang, 70, Chinese-American computer engineer, cancer.

=== 25 ===
- Len Astill, 73, English footballer.
- Karl Brown, 93, American filmmaker.
- George Clayden, 86, Australian footballer.
- Carl Emmermann, 75, German U-boat commander during World War II.
- David Evans, 56, English cricket player.
- Jean Hauet, 65, French Olympic field hockey player (1948, 1952).
- Bertil Linde, 83, Swedish ice hockey player and Olympic medalist (1928).
- Charles Lucet, 79, French diplomat.
- A. D. Williams, 56, American football player (Green Bay Packers, Cleveland Browns, Minnesota Vikings).

=== 26 ===
- Chet Brewer, 83, American baseball player.
- Tris Coffin, 80, American actor, lung cancer.
- Halston, 57, American fashion designer, AIDS.
- Brūno Kalniņš, 90, Russian-Swedish politician.
- Michel Mirowski, 65, Polish-born American physician, multiple myeloma.
- Maniben Patel, 86, Indian independence activist and politician.
- Alan Solem, 58, American malacologist.

=== 27 ===
- Percy Beard, 82, American track and field athlete and Olympic medalist (1932).
- Václav Bubník, 64, Czechoslovak Olympic ice hockey player (1952, 1956).
- Marilyn Buferd, 65, American actress, pancreatic cancer.
- Alfred Earle, 82, British RAF officer.
- Colin Jamieson, 66, Australian politician.
- František Kopečný, 80, Czechoslovak linguist.
- Ray Kuka, 68, American basketball player (New York Knicks).
- Lester James Maitland, 91, American aviator.
- Frank Mockridge, 86, Australian rules footballer.

=== 28 ===
- George Arthur, 65, Australian Olympic soccer player (1956).
- Gino Cappello, 69, Italian footballer.
- Thomas Cree, 75, Australian Olympic rower (1936).
- Henry Hecksher, 79, American intelligence officer, Parkinson's disease.
- Piet Metman, 73, Dutch Olympic swimmer (1936).
- Johnny Neun, 89, American baseball player (Detroit Tigers, Boston Braves), pancreatic cancer.
- Kurt Scharf, 87, German Lutheran prelate.
- Helene Whitney, 75, American actress, pneumonia.

=== 29 ===
- Paul Berezney, 74, American NFL player (Green Bay Packers).
- Adoor Bhasi, 63, Indian actor and film director, diabetes.
- Barbara Baer Capitman, 69, American community activist, heart failure.
- Ralph M. Freeman, 87, American district judge (United States District Court for the Eastern District of Michigan).
- Joseph Hilger, 86–87, Luxembourgish Olympic runner (1924).
- Phil Masi, 74, American baseball player (Boston Braves, Pittsburgh Pirates, Chicago White Sox).
- Alain Oulman, 61, Portuguese songwriter.
- Russell Evans Smith, 81, American district judge (United States District Court for the District of Montana).
- John Steele, 84, English cricketer.
- Archie Strimel, 71, American Olympic soccer player (1948).

=== 30 ===
- Thea Bowman, 52, American Roman Catholic evangelist, cancer.
- Harry Bridges, 88, Australian-American unionist.
- Edvin Hansen, 70, Danish Danish Olympic footballer (1948).
- Joseph O. Hirschfelder, 78, American nuclear physicist.
- Eberhard Klagemann, 85, German film producer.
- James Nickel, 60, Canadian Olympic canoeist (1952).
- Vladimir Stolnikov, 56, Soviet Olympic boxer (1956).

=== 31 ===
- Piera Aulagnier, 66, French psychologist, cancer.
- Pierre Destailles, 80, French film, stage and television actor.
- John Hawkes, 90, Australian tennis player.
- Horace Hazell, 80, English cricket player.
- Saxon Judd, 70, American football player.
- Knut Ansgar Nelson, 83, Danish-Swedish Roman Catholic prelate.
- Heinz-Günter Wittmann, 63, German biochemist.
