= Arrell =

Arrell is a surname. Notable people with the surname include:

- Dave Arrell (1913–1990), Australian rules footballer
- James Arrell (1888–1955), American rugby union player

== See also ==
- Arrell Gibson (1921–1987), American historian and author
- Harrell (name)
