= Harrell =

Harrell can refer to:

- Harrell (name), given name and surname
- Harrell, Alabama, United States
- Harrell, Arkansas, United States

== See also ==
- Harrells, North Carolina, United States
- Harrel, surname
