= Hauet =

Hauet is a French surname. Notable people with the surname include:

- Claude Hauet (1925–1995), French field hockey player
- Jean Hauet (1925–1990), French field hockey player
