= Samuel Bartlett =

Samuel Bartlett may refer to:

- Samuel Bartlett (silversmith) (1752–1821), American silversmith
- Samuel L. Bartlett, American architect
- Samuel Colcord Bartlett (1817–1898), president of Dartmouth College
