= Joseph Loring =

American silversmith (1743 - 1815)

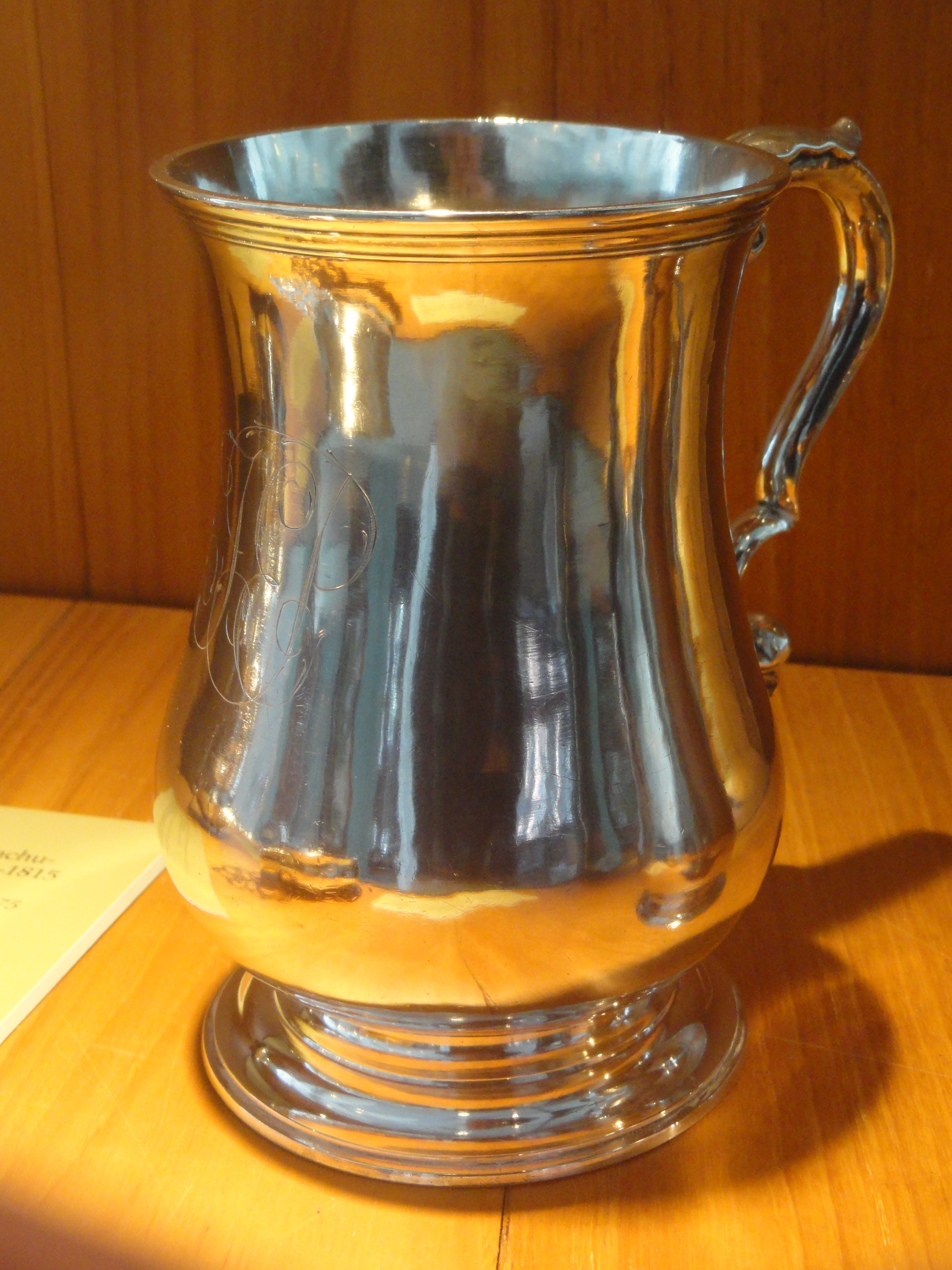
Cann by Samuel Bartlett and Joseph Loring, c. 1785

Joseph Loring (July 21, 1743 – 1815) was an American silversmith, active in Boston.

== Biography ==
Loring was born in Hull, Massachusetts, the son of Caleb and Rebecca (Lobdell) Loring, and apprenticed about 1756 to Benjamin Burt or Paul Revere in Boston, where he worked from 1765 to 1813 as a silversmith and jeweler. He was listed in the 1789 and 1800 city directories at 3 Union Street, and from 1796 to 1813 identified as a goldsmith and jeweler at 14 Court Street. Loring was married three times: to Mary Atkins on August 21, 1766; to an unknown second wife; to Sally Pratt as his third wife.

Loring produced a variety of forms, including baptismal basins, beakers, cans, wine cups, creampots, and porringers, but few teapots. Some items he produced also include marks of Jesse Churchill of Boston; Samuel Bartlett of Concord; or Ebenezer Moulton of Newburyport, Massachusetts. It is possible that these men supplied one another with silver to meet market demand. Loring's work is collected in the Museum of Fine Arts, Boston, Art Institute of Chicago, Metropolitan Museum of Art, and Winterthur Museum.
