= Hilde Purwin =

German journalist

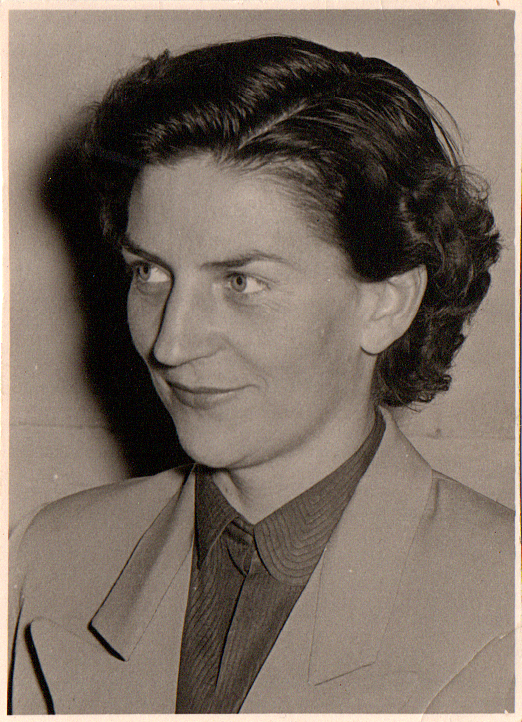
- Purwin in 1953
- Born: Hildegard Gertrud Burkhardt; 16 September 1919; Obernissa (Erfurt), Prussia, Germany
- Died: 29 March 2010 (aged 90); Bonn, North Rhine-Westphalia, Germany
- Occupations: Translator, secretary, intelligence agent, counter-intelligence operative, political journalist
- Spouses: Gerhard Beetz (m. 1943; div. 1947) Carl-Heinz Purwin (m. 1951)
- Children: Ulrich Purwin
- Parents: Eduard Burkhardt; Martha Bähr

Hilde Purwin (born Hildegard Burkhardt: 16 September 1919 – 29 March 2010) was a German journalist. She was exceptionally talented as a linguist and had an unusually powerful memory.

She was recruited by the Sicherheitsdienst (SD) in October 1939. She worked initially as a security services "mail clerk" but in July 1940 was transferred to Berlin where she became an Italian interpreter. In July 1942 she was sent to Rome where at various stages she worked, ostensibly, as a secretary and/or an interpreter. Between September 1943 and July 1944 she played a pivotal role in the so-called "Ciano operation". After the defeat of Nazi Germany the American intelligence services benefited from her wartime intelligence gathering. They also acquired valuable additional intelligence because she took extra carbon copies - unbeknownst to German intelligence - of more than 700 sheets that she had translated from Italian source documents into German during the final months of the war. She sorted and sequenced these, and buried them in a large carefully sealed tin under the strawberry patch beside the apple tree in the garden at the family home where her widowed mother still lived.

In 1946 the United States military administration in Germany employed her as a simultaneous translator and recruited her for intelligence work. They gave her a new identity, knocking a year off her age. She became "Hilde Blum" born in 1920 and was mandated, under the code name "Gambit", to identify and unmask Soviet agents operating in Berlin. However, after a few years she decided that she did not wish to spend the rest of her life in espionage activities. She joined the Berlin Telegraf (newspaper), initially as a volunteer reporter, and quickly rose to become a distinguished political correspondent. She formed a particularly good working relationship with West German Chancellor Konrad Adenauer. He regularly picked her out for impromptu "interviews" in the lobby or restaurant at the Bundestag even though he liked to open their discussions with the insight, "I do know that you vote for the wrong side, Mrs. Purwin" ("Ich weiß ja, dat Se (Note: It was not unusual for Konrad Adenauer to introduce words from his local Kölsch dialect into casual conversation.) falsch wählen, Frau Purwin") - Hilde Purwin was a Social Democrat supporter and made no secret of the fact.

Two marriages and time spent in the espionage community left Hilde Purwin with an unusually wide range of names by which she may be identified in sources. (Note: Two marriages and time spent in the espionage community left Hilde Purwin with an unusually wide range of names by which she may be identified in sources. * Between 1919 and 1943 she was Hildegard Gertrud "Hilde" Burkhardt. * Her first marriage took place in 1943 as a result of which she became Hildegard "Felizitas" Beetz. * In 1947 American intelligence provided her with a new identity and she became "Hilde Blum". In addition, they gave her two code names for intelligence work, first "Gambit" and later "Camise". * Her second marriage took place in 1952 as a result of which she became Hildegard "Hilde" Purwin.)

== Life ==
=== Provenance and early years ===
Hildegard Gertrud Burkhardt was born in Obernissa, a small village few kilometers to the east of Erfurt in what would then have been seen as southern central Germany. Her early childhood was spent in Obernissa. The family later moved to a house alongside the elegant Belvederer Allee in Weimar, twenty or so minutes (by train) to the east of Erfurt. According to at least one source this was so that the family's talented daughter could be enrolled at the (normally boys-only) "Realgymnasium" (secondary school) there and benefit from the excellent languages teaching which the school provided. Her father, Eduard Burkhardt, was a teacher (and former World War I flying officer). Hildegard, born in 1919, was the elder of her parents' two recorded children. Her brother Rolf was born two years later. 1933, the year the Nazis took power, was the year of her fourteenth birthday. It was also the year in which her father died. She completed her schooling in 1937 and went to Dresden to take a "Pflichtjahr" (a form of mandatory gap year) working as a childcare helper for the Madaus family who were the owners of a major pharmaceuticals company. A year later she went to Leipzig to undertake an intensive languages course which was sufficient to qualify her for work as a simultaneous translator in Italian soon afterwards. She had intended to follow her year in Leipzig with a further year undertaking a similar course in francophone Lausanne in order to attain equivalent fluency in French but that plan was closed off by the outbreak of the Second World War in September 1939.

=== German intelligence ===
She was recruited by the Sicherheitsdienst, the SS's security and intelligence agency, through her local government employment office ("Arbeitsamt") in September/October 1939. Commentators accept Burkhardt's contention that her first promotion within the German intelligence services took place only after she had raised the issue with her boss. It would not be the last time that she would demonstrate a combination of self belief and professional ambition which at that time might well have been considered unladylike. She informed "SS Sturmbannführer Hermann" that "she was good with languages and wished to use them". She was transferred in July 1940 from the provincial mail room in Weimar to "Amt VI" (literally "Office 6"), the department in Berlin that dealt with political foreign intelligence. Her work involved translating reports from Italian agents. She also reviewed Italian and Vatican newspapers and provided translations of those "showing certain anti-German tendencies". In this respect she was therefore already being required to apply certain analytical skills and judgements alongside the basic clerical and organisational tasks commonly associated with a secretarial role.

In July 1941 she was posted to the wartime German embassy in Rome, employed as the secretary to Guido Zimmer. Zimmer was the senior member of "Amt VI" at the diplomatic mission, mandated to "sort out" the "intelligence situation" in Rome. He seems to have failed, and was recalled to Berlin in November 1941. His secretary, Hilde Burkhardt, was recalled with him and resumed her work in Berlin as an Italian language interpreter. However, in July 1942 she returned to the Rome embassy, now as secretary to Zimmer's successor, Helmut Looss. Looss was also recalled to Berlin, from where he was sent to work on the Russian front, after a relatively short time in Rome. After the war ended Hildegard Beetz (as she had by that time become) was invited to compile a detailed description of her work for the German intelligence services. Somewhere along the way she had picked up eerily good English. There were doubtless matters that she failed to mention, but what she included was judged by the US intelligence officers reading her "Lebenslauf" ("résumé") to be broadly accurate. She wrote that her boss, Helmut Looss, "was simply not interested in the work and, therefore, let me do everything". Looss was not replaced in Rome, and this time Burkhardt was not sent back to Berlin. She remained in Rome, undertaking the "Amt VI" work, and employed, formally, as secretary to the police attache, Herbert Kappler. In the words of her report to the Americans, "I worked alone until August 1943".

In June 1943 she married General Staff Officer Gerhard Beetz. In August 1943, however, with Allied troops approaching Rome and Mussolini under arrest, all female German government workers were evacuated from Rome. Hilde "Felizitas" Beetz returned to Berlin to work for Wilhelm Höttl, the newly appointed head of the "Amt VI Italien-Referat".

=== Ciano ===
Between September 1943 and July 1944 "Felizitas" Beetz played a pivotal role in the so-called "Ciano operation". Galeazzo Ciano was Benito Mussolini's son-in-law. He served between June 1936 and his sacking by Mussolini on 5 February 1943 as Foreign Minister. Following the Grand Council vote of 24 July 1943 in which Ciano joined with the majority and opposed his father-in-law, voting to invite King Victor Emmanuel III to "resume his full constitutional powers", and the ensuing political take-over by General Pietro Badoglio, Ciano was on the receiving end of a vicious press campaign, deprived of a passport, and kept under virtual house arrest at his home in Italy. He began to fear for his personal safety and that of his family. On 27 August 1943 German intelligence arranged for Ciano and his family to be transported to Ciampino airfield, while avoiding the Italian police. Ciano was picked up by one car while his wife Edda and their three children were taken while walking in the park, by a different route, by another car, to a pre-assigned meeting point in the city where they were placed in a German army truck for the airport transfer. From Ciampino they were flown to Munich on board a Luftwaffe Ju 52 transport. What Ciano regarded as his escape was organised personally by Beetz's new boss Wilhelm Höttl. For Höttl and German Intelligence, the over-riding objective of the "Ciano operation" was to obtain Ciano's diaries and extensive supporting papers concerning his years at the heart of Italy's political establishment, which the German government feared might include incriminating or embarrassing information about relations between the two governments or, indeed, about the German foreign minister, Joachim von Ribbentrop (whom Ciano was known to hate).

Ciano had assumed that once he reached Munich it would be a simple matter to arrange for him and his family to move to Madrid, and when this did not happen as anticipated he expressly offered Höttl his diaries (which were still safely hidden in Italy) in return for expediting the Ciano family's move to neutral Spain. Höttl believed that the Ciano diaries would be of huge political importance and he persuaded Ernst Kaltenbrunner, the head of the Reich Security Main Office, that Ciano's information could be used to discredit the Foreign Minister, Joachim von Ribbentrop. At the political level, the security services reported to Heinrich Himmler, whose mandate covered a wide range of domestic responsibilities. Something that Himmler shared with his security chief, and indeed with virtually the entire German intelligence establishment, was a loathing of von Ribbentrop.

While Ciano was held, at this stage with his wife and children, under elegant house arrest in a lakeside villa in the hamlet of Allmannshausen, south of Munich, the security services assigned "Felizitas" Beetz to act as his "translator-hostess". Through her work at the embassy in Rome she already knew Ciano reasonably well, but she now had the opportunity to become better acquainted with Edda Ciano and the couple's three children. Ciano would have been under no doubt that Beetz was there to spy on him, but she was self-evidently not a "typical career spook", and he was charmed by her. The charm was clearly mutual and the two became close, though Beetz always insisted that they never became lovers. Edda Ciano was probably more aware of the acute danger in which her husband found himself than he was. In the months that followed she treated Beetz not as a rival for Ciano's affection, but as a well-positioned ally in a shared struggle to save his life.

In September 1943 the Germans rescued Mussolini (who was held prisoner in Campo Imperatore) and "restored him" as dictator of the Italian Social Republic, which covered the central and northern parts of Italy still controlled by the Germans. On 19 October 1943 Ciano was flown back to Italy where he faced a treason trial and probable execution. The transfer back to Italy was arranged by two of Foreign Minister von Ribbentrop's men. Hitler knew about it but the intelligence services received no advanced notification. Ciano's children, whom Hitler believed were important for the future of Italy, stayed in Germany. On the flight south Ciano was accompanied by SS bodyguards, Edda Ciano and Wilhelm Höttl's "Roman secretary, Hildegard Beetz, smuggled in as a woman intepreter". When the plane landed at Verona Ciano was promptly arrested "by both German and Italian police". Mussolini was now back in control and Ciano, along with others who had voted against him in the Grand Council vote of 24 July 1943, was transferred to a Verona prison cell during the first part of November 1943. Benito Mussolini had personally given orders that his daughter should not be permitted access to her husband in his prison cell. Uniquely, Hildegard Beetz enjoyed virtually unrestricted access, however. Beetz had her instructions from Höttl. She was to "make contact with Ciano in prison and find out from him where he had hidden the papers". Ciano understood her role perfectly well: "She is a spy, but she is mine". Beetz was able to smuggle letters and messages between Edda and Ciano in his cell. There is every indication that she became increasingly determined to do what she could to save her "target's" life.

Ciano remained keen to try and escape with his family to Spain, but Beetz was able to persuade him that it would be better for him to go to Hungary, which was for most purposes controlled by Nazi Germany. This reflected a concern on the part of the German intelligence chief, Ernst Kaltenbrunner, that Hitler might have misgivings about a high-profile prisoner of the Italian puppet state being released beyond the confines of the Axis powers. Ciano agreed to this and an agreement was drawn up with a Hungarian aristocrat who was willing to accommodate the Ciano family on his estate in a remote corner of Transylvania. Increasingly aware of the danger he was in, Ciano told Beetz where some of the papers that the Germans wanted could be found. The documents were found in the location indicated and, in the words of Wilhelm Höttl, "afforded ample proof of the immense value which the complete collection would be".

On Christmas Day 1943 it became known that Ciano and others who had opposed Mussolini on 24 July 1943 would face trial on or shortly after 28 December 1943. The outcome was a foregone conclusion: Ciano would be executed. Beetz had already met with her immediate superior, Wilhelm Höttl, in Berlin on 4 December 1943 to discuss an idea for saving Ciano and obtaining the treasure-trove of his papers. Höttl told her to put her plan to him in writing for the benefit of the intelligence chief, Ernst Kaltenbrunner, which she did.

On 2 January 1944 a meeting took place in Innsbruck between Hildegard Beetz, Wilhelm Höttl, Ernst Kaltenbrunner and Wilhelm Harster. Harster had recently transferred to the Italian sector from the Netherlands and had set up his office in Verona. He ranked directly below Kaltenbrunner and directly above Höttl. The four participants agreed that (1) Ciano must disclose the whereabouts of "his Foreign Office records in Rome" as evidence of his good faith, and so that the German intelligence services could take them over, (2) Ciano was to be forcibly removed from the Verona prison by the Germans and taken rapidly, with his family, across the border into Switzerland, accompanied by Beetz, (3) once he was safely in Switzerland Ciano was to hand over his diaries to Beetz and (4) Beetz would return to Verona with the diaries and hand them over to Harster: Ciano would be provided with some money. (By this time Ciano was virtually bereft of assets, apart from the value imputed to the diaries.) Kaltenbrunner accepted the agreement and said he would stick to it even if that meant going against Hitler: conspicuously, however, he refused to sign it. Beetz met Edda the next day to deliver a (secret) letter from Ciano and inform her of what had been agreed. There are various versions of what happened next. It is possible that some of the Rome documents were held back on behalf of Ciano. Kaltenbrunner and / or Himmler may have felt it was necessary to disclose the plan to Hitler, who then declined to approve it. It is also possible that Kaltenbrunner called off the deal at the last minute simply because he believed that Hitler would not have approved it if he had known of it. Ciano was due to be "sprung" from his jail cell by the Germans on 7 January 1944, but in the event that never happened. He faced trial at Verona during 8–10 January 1944. He was one of five defendants sentenced to death and killed by a firing squad on 11 January 1944. Beetz spent the last night of Ciano's life ("...[the] most terrible night of my life") at Ciano's side in his cell. Later she let it be known that she thought Ciano had been betrayed by the Germans. She complained to Kaltenbrunner after the war about his failure to live up to his promises in respect of the matter. In the words of one source, Kaltenbrunner "in return, subtly reminded Beetz of hierarchical realities and her gender: he sent he a bouquet of roses".

Directly after Ciano's killing Hilde Beetz was involved, together with Emilio Pucci, in helping Edda disappear over the mountains beyond Como into Switzerland. Sources differ over whether the diaries travelled with Edda at this point, or whether they remained hidden in Italy till after the war. Either way, they were eventually delivered not to Berlin but, in 1946, to Washington DC where they were microfilmed before being returned to the Italian government. Aware that she had shown a greater degree of "initiative" than was necessarily compatible with her status, Beetz became concerned that if she were to be condemned or scapegoated for her activities as a possible "double agent" it might damage her husband or younger brother, and indeed create problems for her widowed mother. One precaution that she took was to get in touch with Susanna Agnelli, a Ciano family friend who was based in Lausanne studying medicine. From Agnelli she obtained a cyanide capsule. However, she never found it necessary to commit suicide.

Someone who did commit suicide at the end of April 1945 was Adolf Hitler. A couple of weeks earlier he gave orders that all the Ciano papers should be destroyed. However, Hilde Beetz had somehow got hold of two volumes of Ciano diaries that had been left by Edda while a patient at the "La Ramiola" clinic at Parma shortly before her husband was executed. These covered the important pre-war period from 1937 till 1939. It is not clear whether Beetz had the originals or merely micro-fiched copies of them. In the summer of 1944, by now back in Weimar living with her mother in the house where she had grown up, she was instructed to produce translations of them all. These, it turns out, are the papers (or possibly only some of the papers) identified in the US intelligence report produced by Lt. Col. Andrew H. Berding in June 1945. Beetz had sorted them and hid them in her parents' garden during the early months of 1945. They were buried in a tin under a bed of roses which has led to them being identified in some sources, subsequently, as the "Rose Garden" papers. (Note: Some sources indicate the papers were buried under a bed of rose bushes while others indicate they were buried under a strawberry patch. It is not clear whether this means that there were two separate sets of papers buried by Hilde Beetz in her mother's garden, or a single set of papers buried under a former rose bed which was now being used to grow strawberries, possibly as a response to wartime food shortages.) The diaries covered in some detail notes of conversations and correspondence that Foreign Minister Galeazzo Ciano had conducted with Adolf Hitler, Benito Mussolini, and the seemingly ever-lasting German Foreign Minister Joachim von Ribbentrop. English and French political leaders also featured. In 1948 an English-language version was published in London in a volume, which also included diary extracts from the early 1940s, entitled "Ciano’s Diplomatic Papers", edited by the journalist Malcolm Muggeridge who provided a characteristically sanctimonious introduction, and translated by Stuart Hood who had spent the war years as a British intelligence officer in Egypt and Italy.

Beetz's role during the war years later provided the plot for a succession of books and feature films. One example was Il processo di Verona ("The Verona Trial"), a film directed by Carlo Lizzani which appeared in 1963 and in which Beetz's role was portrayed by Françoise Prévost. That part of her life was also recaptured by Dietlinde Turban in the 1985 television "docudrama" Mussolini and I, directed by Alberto Negrin.

=== US intelligence ===
The wartime marriage with Gerhard Beetz ended in divorce in 1947. War had ended in May 1945 and although the Thuringia region was liberated from the Nazis by the US Army, the wartime allies had already agreed that Weimar and the region surrounding it should be administered as part of the Soviet occupation zone. The next phase in Hildegard Beetz's life unfolded not in her (former) home town but further to the south, in Bavaria which was administered as part of the American zone. From subsequently declassified intelligence documents it is clear that by the middle of June 1945 she had already been questioned in some detail, probably in Munich, under the direction of Lt. Col. Andrew H. Berding of the Twelfth United States Army Group. The Americans decided early on that they might be able to make use of Beetz's abilities. She provided Berding with insights into the thinking and possible intentions of her former boss, Wilhelm Höttl, providing, they noted, "partial confirmation of the suspicion that Dr. Hoettl had offered the services of his Southeastern Europe intelligence network to the Americans to further his own political ambitions in Austria." Henry Hecksher, who in 1946 became head of OSS counterintelligence in Berlin, described Beetz approvingly as "probably one of those extremely rare Germans who understand and are sympathetic to Democracy."

OSS decided to use Beetz as a "penetrating agent" in Munich. They gave her the code name "Gambit". It was proposed that she should obtain a secretarial job through a local employment agency and join the Roman Catholic Church in order to provide suitable cover. Despite her record of "freelancing" there was some confidence that she could be controlled, because as a former member of German intelligence during the Nazi period she fell into the "automatic arrest" category. Also her husband was still being held by the Americans as a prisoner of war. In a vetting recorded on 12 October 1945 Beetz herself insisted she had always been a "reluctant Nazi" and that she had stopped paying her party membership fees during her time working for the German government in Rome. She now found a job with a translation bureau in Munich. Business was booming. The bureau was owned by a man who had been a committed Nazi but was now converted, with equivalent passion, to communism. "...Engage yourselves with the ideals of Socialism", urged one of the tracts that he published around this time. However, by the end of 1945 her OSS handlers had the impression that Agent "Gambit" was "underutilized" because she had only very limited opportunities to make appropriate contacts.

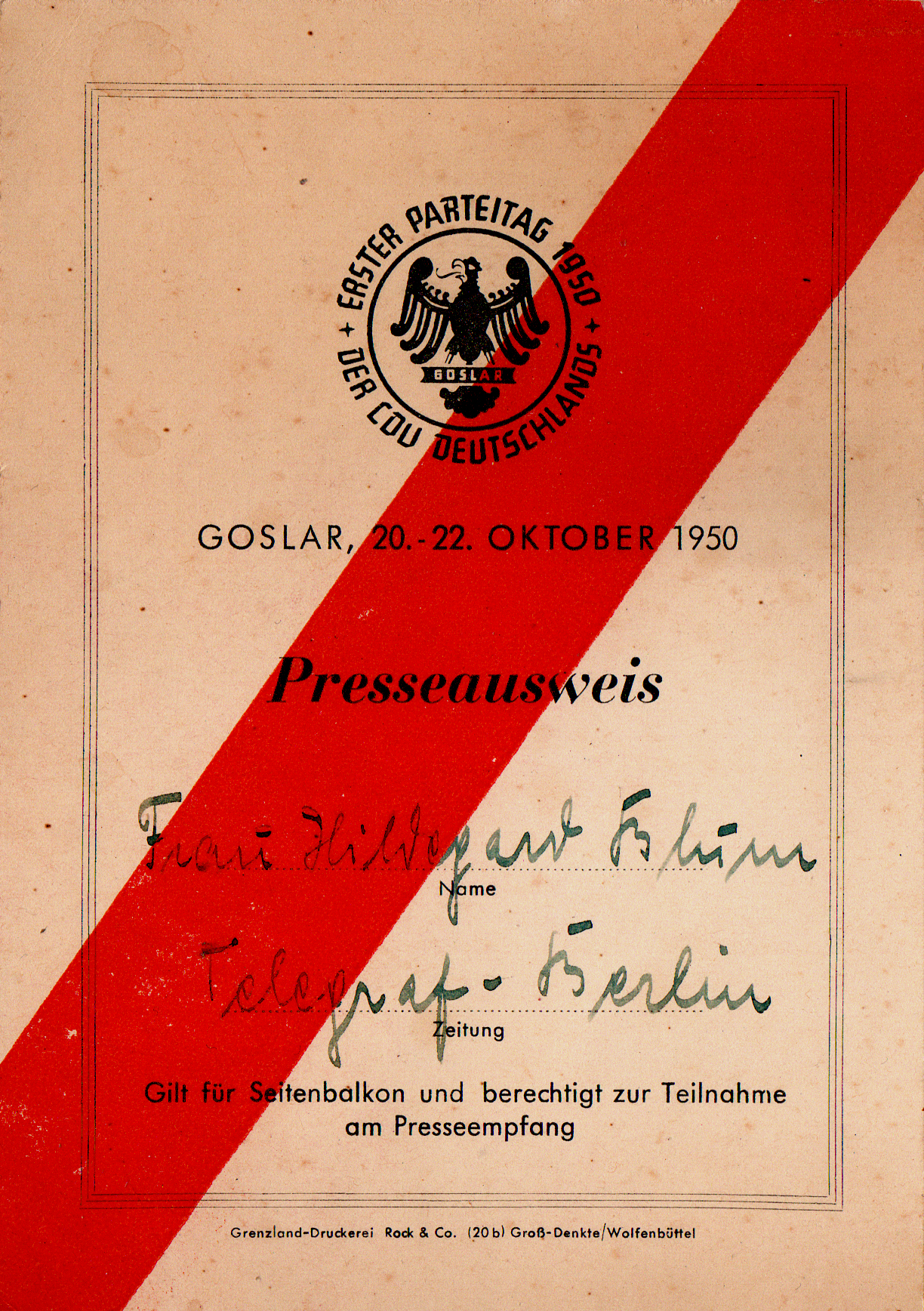
Press Pass: "...the SSU falsified her 'denazification papers' and gave her a new identity as 'Hildegard Blum'"

In April 1946 she was transferred to Berlin to work on a "secret project". Hecksher arranged for her employment as a confidential agent in the Economics Division of the Office of Military Government (OMGUS). The mission, which became known as "Project Sitting Duck" was intended to determine the extent of suspected Soviet penetration of the American military command in Berlin. The Strategic Services Unit (SSU) falsified her "denazification papers" and gave her a new identity as "Hildegard Blum". The intention was that she should become a target for recruitment by Soviet intelligence and then a double agent controlled covertly by American Intelligence. Similar attempts had already been made using American "decoy" personnel to attract Soviet recruiters, but it was asserted that the Soviets had found it difficult to trust an American insider so readily as they might be persuaded to trust "a well-placed German secretary". "Project Sitting Duck" had to be deemed a failure in November 1946. Hecksher now changed tack, using another SSU agent to entice an MVD agent called Captain Skurin to recruit "Gambit" to the Soviet cause. At least one meeting between "Gambit" and Skurin took place in the French sector of Berlin. However, this attempt to plant Beetz as a double agent with the Soviets also came to nothing.

In 1947 the OSS was rebranded and in many respects reconfigured, becoming the Central Intelligence Agency (CIA). The CIA now took a career defining decision for Beetz who acquired a new code name, "Camise". She was introduced as an "intern" into the office of Arno Scholz, a longstanding member of the German Social Democratic Party (SPD) and now editor in chief of the "Telegraf" (newspaper), based in the British occupied sector of Berlin. US intelligence was deeply suspicious of social democrats. Through Agent "Camise" they monitored Scholz's activities and gained information about his contacts. Social democrats being preferable to Soviet-style communists, they also subsidised distribution of "Telegraf" in the Soviet sector of Berlin. CIA operational use of Agent "Camise" fizzled out after 1950, however, when the newspaper promoted her to headship of its office in Frankfurt am Main where the intelligence situation was less frenetic and Soviet political and espionage activity was less overtly ubiquitous. In 1951 she remarried. Her husband was Carl Heinz Purwin, a trades unionist and journalist who at this point was identified as editor of "Welt der Arbeit" (loosely, "The world of labour"). The CIA briefly considered using her new husband's political connections to "penetrate" the SPD, but nothing came of this. Hilde Purwin herself had evidently come to the conclusion that she would rather be a political journalist than an intelligence agent. She later recalled in her unpublished memoirs that it was friendly advice from the former OSS agent Lawrence de Neufville (who became a longstanding friend) that inspired her to embark on this new profession. The CIA nevertheless continued to follow her career with interest. In 1961 a proposal was floated that she might be used to plant articles in West German newspapers; but operational approval for the idea from the counterintelligence department was not forthcoming. Staff concluded that Purwin "was too knowledgeable about the CIA's operations in Germany and could identify too many officers". The comment was also recorded that she was "politically confused". In 1979 Thomas Polgar, her former handler on behalf of US intelligence (and for many years a good friend), held several meetings with her and reported that she had become "a living encyclopaedia of political and personality information". The last time the CIA seriously considered "reactivating" their former agent evidently came in 1982, but they concluded that her qualities were no longer appropriate to their contemporary requirements. Her greatest "strength" in the past had been "the ease with which she handled case officers for her own benefit. We earnestly hope you will not request permission to initiate a relationship with Camise unless you are convinced that she has something unique to offer, something that she and she alone can provide".

=== Political journalist ===
The move to Frankfurt was undertaken in order to enable her to cover the activities of the Bizonal Economic Council which was based there. However, around this time the council was replaced by a relaunch, in respect of West Germany, of the Bundestag which was "provisionally" based not in Frankfurt but down-river in Bonn, and it was in Bonn that Hilde Purwin now settled. The Purwins' son was born in 1952, and shortly afterwards the family were joined in their home by a dachshund who shared a birthday with the child. Hilde Purwin became Bonn correspondent for the Neue Ruhr Zeitung (NRZ), remaining with the newspaper for more than three decades, till her retirement in 1984, and also contributing to a number of other "left-wing" newspapers. She became, in the words of one sub-editor finding a title for an obituary published in 2010, "a Bonn institution".

Hilde Purwin had a huge respect for the abilities of SPD party chairman Herbert Wehner, a man whose hardline approach to party discipline was not universally admired by colleagues:
"In my view he was as important as Adenauer, and far above any of the other politicians of the postwar period."
"Er war der Mann, der in meinen Augen so bedeutend ist wie Adenauer und mit jenem zusammen alle anderen Politiker der Nachkriegsjahre weit überragte."

Hilde Purwin, quoted by Carl Schulz

Journalistic independence was always more important to Purwin the journalist than loyal adherence to a party line. She was a committed member of the Social Democratic Party and the NRZ was a Social Democratic newspaper, but when the party achieved a poor result under the leadership of Erich Ollenhauer in the 1953 election she published her analysis under the headline "Heads must roll". Party comrades were appalled and she was even threatened with expulsion. Later that decade she became one of only very few journalists to win the trust of the SPD's famously waspish (in public) Herbert Wehner. For her first interview with him, during the early 1950s, she was summoned to his apartment early one Sunday morning. As he opened the door to her he put his finger to his lips: there were two men asleep on camp beds in the hallway. When they had crept through to his study Wehner explained that the men were two East German escapees who had turned up exhausted at his front door the previous evening. "For Herbert Wehner", she later wrote, "you really can apply the idea of a soft core hidden inside a hard shell" ("Auf Herbert Wehner, trifft der Spruch vom weichen Kern hinter harter Schale haargenau zu").

"Being a journalist in Bonn in those early days was exciting and invigorating every day, and frequently also through the nights."
"In jenen Anfangszeiten Journalist in Bonn zu sein, war jeden Tag und manche Nacht spannend und aufregend."

Hilde Purwin's (still unpublished) autobiography, quoted by Carl Schulz

She achieved a notable scoop in the late Autumn of 1959 when Chancellor Adenauer delivered an off-the-record background briefing to a small circle of selected conservative Press club journalists. Purwin was not in a conservative clique, but she had nevertheless been one of the 22 founder members of the Bonn press club back in 1952. The "old man" (by now well into his ninth decade) was in such good form that she risked a very direct question: "Why, Chancellor, do you hold such a low opinion of your Economics Minister, Vice-chancellor Erhard?". Although confidentiality had already been agreed among those present, Adenauer chose not to answer. More unexpectedly, a couple of days later he invited Purwin to a one-on-one meeting in the chancelry office. She was not permitted to take notes, but she was armed with her excellent memory, and the chancellor told her at some length why he thought that Ludwig Erhard was totally unsuitable to replace him. (Erhard did succeed Adenauer, but he had to wait till 1963.)

An interview with Adenauer under these circumstances would have been a rare opportunity for any journalist, and Purwin took her chance and asked him about other issues, such as his policy in respect of East Germany. His answers were, again, quite open. In the end she extracted his agreement that she might publish a report of the interview in the NRZ. However, the chancellor insisted he should be able to read the article first. The text amounted in most respects to a word for word record of their exchange. To Purwin's astonishment, Chancellor Adenauer's stiff handwriting appeared only in a couple of places, where he entered his "corrections". He left undeleted his potentially head-line grabbing statement that he hoped First Party Secretary Kruschev would soon visit him in Bonn. When the interview appeared in the NRZ the next day it was clear that Adenauer had not consulted with his media staff about his interview with Purwin. The chancellor's press spokesman, Felix von Eckardt, was as surprised as other readers (but much more profoundly vexed) by what he found in the NRZ that morning.

Purwin had a deep respect for Helmut Schmidt's approach to the chancellorship:
"Especially at a time when the oil crisis had sent the world economy into a tailspin, Helmut Schmidt was the right chancellor at the right time."
"Gerade in einer Zeit, in der die Ölkrise die Weltwirtschaft in Bedrängnis brachte, wurde Helmut Schmidt der richtige Kanzler zur richtigen Zeit."

Hilde Purwin, quoted by Carl Schulz

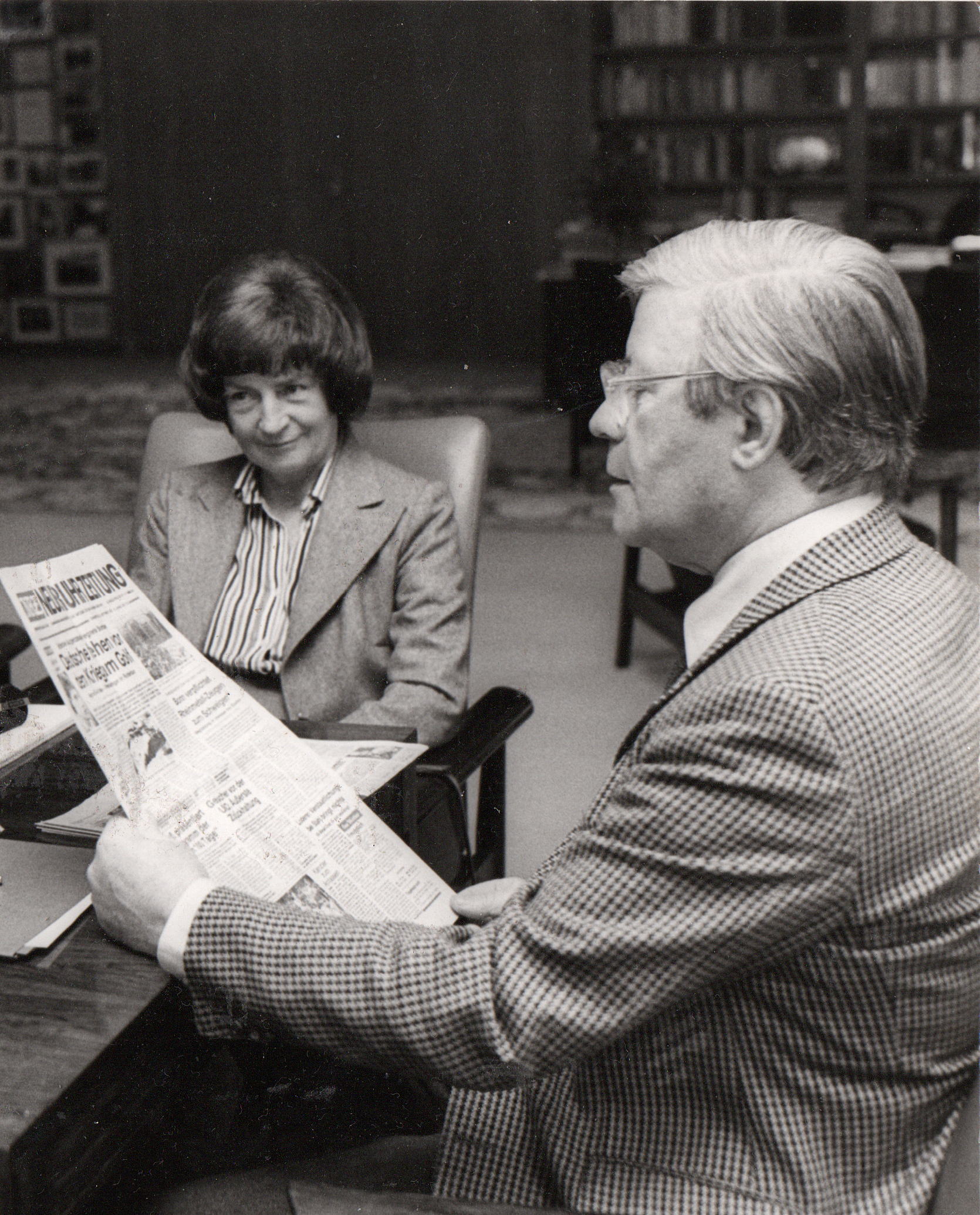
Hilde Purwin with Chancellor Schmidt Knut Garthe, 1980

During the 1960s and 70s Purwin was also close to West Germany's two Social Democratic chancellors, Willy Brandt and the intellectually formidable Helmut Schmidt. In 1974, when Schmidt was elected to lead the party in succession to Brandt following the Guillaume Affair she asked Schmidt if he was not happy with the way fate had landed him with the top job. But Schmidt expressed only anger. "He had passionately urged Brandt - sadly without success - not to resign the chancellorship. It would be a wretched thing if a West German chancellor were to resign his office because of a grubby little East German spy" ("Er habe Brandt dringend, leider vergeblich, vom Rücktritt abgeraten, denn es sei doch eine erbärmliche Sache, dass ein deutscher Bundeskanzler wegen eines miesen kleinen DDR-Spions sein Amt aufgebe"). Purwin subsequently developed a huge respect for the way that Helmut Schmidt approached his work as chancellor, commending his "Hanseatic sobriety".

Hilde Purwin made a number of television appearances in her capacity as a political commentator, notably with stalwart moderator-presenters Werner Höfer and Reinhard Appel. She also participated in numerous radio programmes.

After her retirement in 1984 she continued for some years to write as a freelance journalist.

== Celebration and commemoration ==
Hilde Purwin was awarded the Order of Merit, 1st class in 1970 by Heinz Kühn, at that time Minister-president of North Rhine-Westphalia.

Her still (in 2018) unpublished memoires as well as some of the original documents from the "Felizitas" years have been held, since 2007, in the archive at the German Historical Institute in Rome.
