= Charles Kruger =

Charles Kruger may refer to:

- Charles Krüger (1896–1990), Luxembourgish footballer
- Charles Kruger (politician) (born 1950), member of the Maine House of Representatives
- Charles Rayne Kruger (1922–2002), South African author and property developer

== See also ==
- Charlie Krueger (1937–2021), American football player
