= Purwin =

Purwin is a surname. Notable people with the surname include:

- Alan Purwin (1961–2015), American helicopter pilot, aerial film operator, entrepreneur, and philanthropist
- Hilde Purwin (1919–2010), German journalist
