= Harrel =

Harrel is a surname. It may refer to the following notable people:

- David Harrel (1841–1939), Irish police officer and civil servant
- Donny Harrel (born 1969), American college baseball coach
- Frédérique Harrel, London-based fashion blogger
- Rod Harrel (born 1960), American actor, writer, and director

== See also ==
- Harrell (name), given name and surname
