= Samuel Minott =

American silversmith and retailer

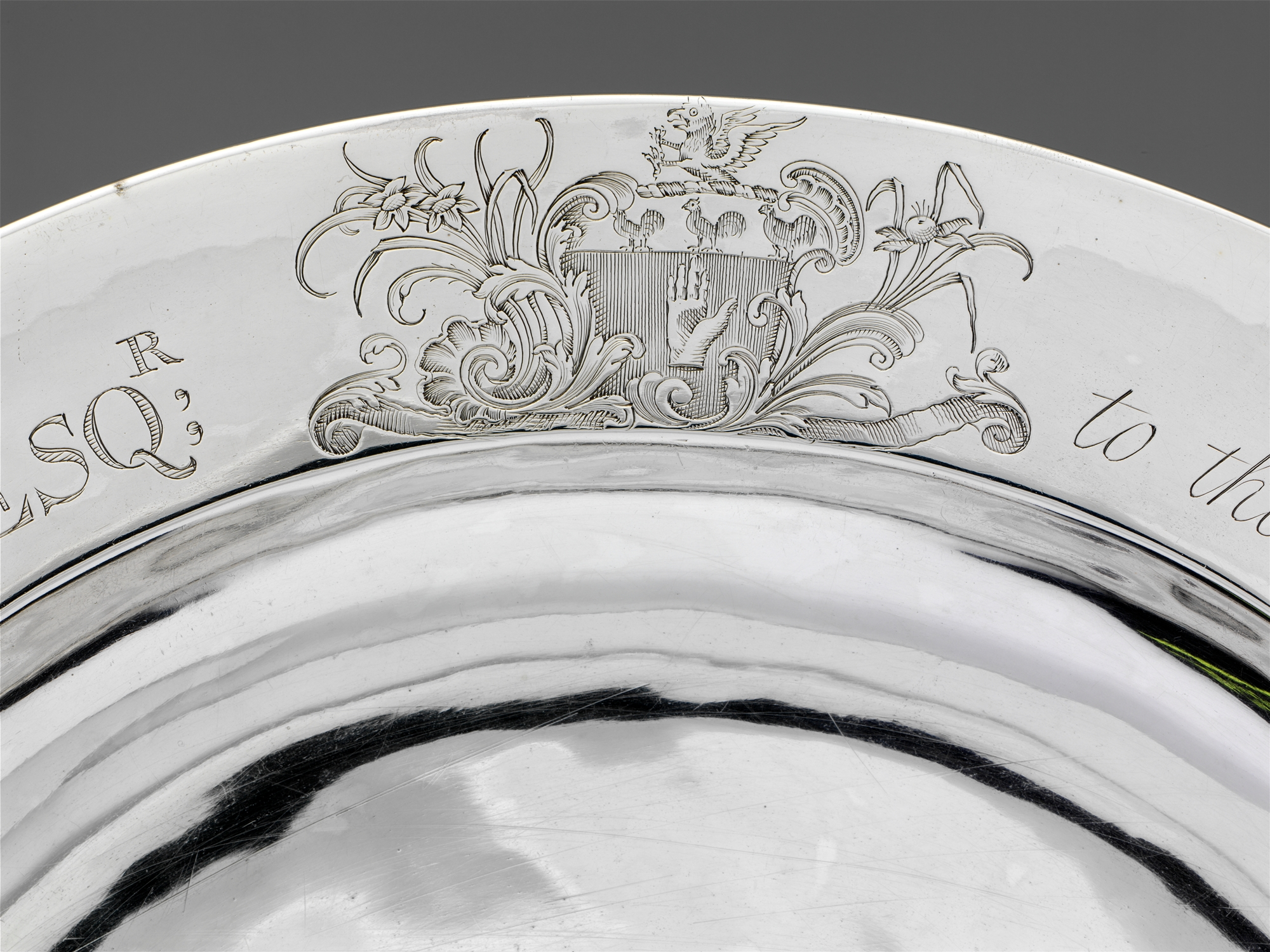
Communion Dish (detail) by Samuel Minott, circa 1764

Samuel Minott (December 22, 1732 - October 17, 1803) was an American silversmith and retailer, active in Boston.

Minott was born in Concord, Massachusetts and probably apprenticed about 1745 to William Homes in Boston. He worked from 1753 to 1803 as a silversmith in the city, during which time he was a partner from 1765 to 1769 with Josiah Austin in Charlestown as MINOTT & AUSTIN, and briefly circa 1770 with William Simpkins in Boston as MINOTT & SIMPKINS. On October 1, 1772, in The Boston Weekly News-Letter, he advertised assorted groceries and pottery "at his Shop opposite William's Court, Cornhill", and was "the Goldsmiths Business in all its Branches as usual at his other Shop Northward of the Draw Bridge." His wares included tea, delft, silver-mounted swords, coral beads, plate and jewelry. He was listed in city directories starting in 1789 as "Minot Samuel, goldsmith, and importer of plated and jewellery-ware, Ann-street", and was still on Ann Street in 1796, but also had a house on Court Street.

Minot married Elizabeth Davis on October 7, 1762. His only known apprentice was Samuel Bartlett. In 1776, he was arrested as a Tory by order of the Common Council, but apparently released as his work and residence continued in Boston. His estate was inventoried October 17, 1803. His work is collected in the Museum of Fine Arts, Boston, Metropolitan Museum of Art, and Worcester Art Museum
