= Harrell F. Beck =

American Preacher

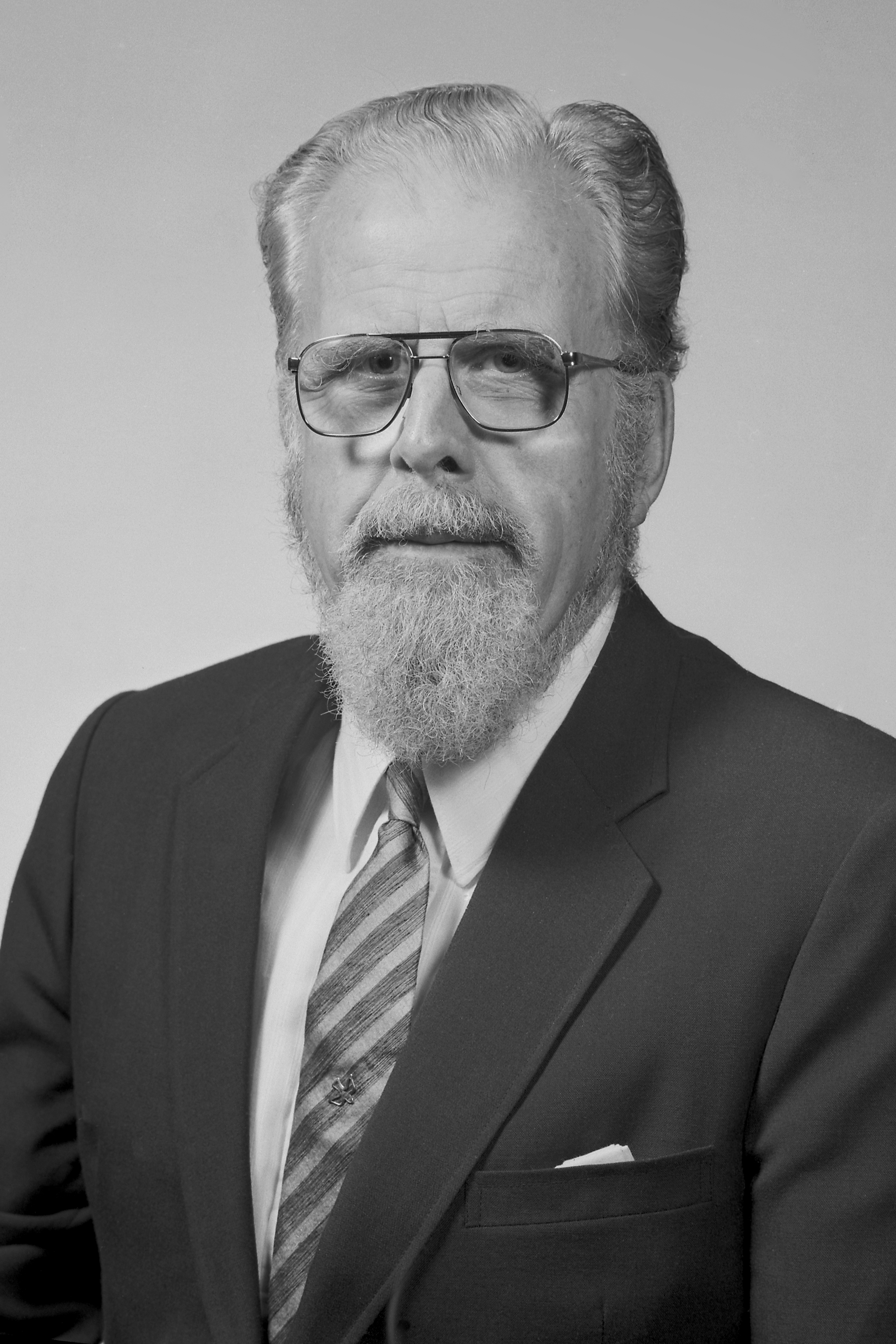
- Harrell F. Beck, Theology Professor, June 27, 1984
- Denomination: The United Methodist Church

Personal
- Date of birth: March 2, 1922
- Place of birth: Lyons, Nebraska, United States
- Date of death: December 10, 1987
- Place of death: Arlington, Massachusetts

Harrell F. Beck (March 2, 1922 – December 10, 1987) was an American preacher, professor, and academic who taught Hebrew Scripture for 33 years at Boston University School of Theology and travelled North America, the Middle East, Southeast Asia, and Australasia teaching and speaking. Walter George Muelder, Dean Emeritus of the School of Theology, wrote, “Harrell Beck’s contribution to the School of Theology and the wider church was enormous.” He generated high esteem as “professor, friend, preacher, prophet, and lecturer...”.

== Background ==
=== Life and education ===
Harrell Frederick Beck was born in Lyons, Nebraska, on March 2, 1922, and went to Wayne State Normal School after high school. In May 1945, Beck graduated with a Ph.D from Boston University School of Theology with highest honors as a Jacob Sleeper Fellow. After being ordained in the Nebraska Annual Conference of what was then called simply the Methodist Church, he moved to Egypt for nine years where he became fluent in Arabic and was a faculty member and dean of the School of Oriental Studies at the American University in Cairo (1945 -1954). There he met and married Leila Atallah. Harrell and Leila had two sons, David and Daniel. Harrell died on December 10, 1987, soon after retiring from Boston University.

=== Professional associations and publications ===
President of the New England section of the Society of Biblical Literature, Harrell also served as the President of the Massachusetts Bible Society Board of Trustees, and, at the time of his death, was serving on the Hymnal Revision committee for the United Methodist Hymnal, where several of his translations and contributions can be found. He was the author of many articles in various theological and religious journals, and at least one Bible study guide for church use, “Our Biblical Heritage,” published in 1964. He was also a contributor to the Interpreter's Dictionary of the Bible (1962) and the Interpreter's One Volume Commentary on the Bible (1971).

== Influence and legacy ==
Beck’s contributions have been recognized with the establishment of an annual lecture series sponsored by the Massachusetts Bible Society. An endowed professorship has been established at the School of Theology at Boston University to honor his contributions to both Old Testament studies and preaching of the highest quality.

Former Beck student, the author and sociologist Rev. Dr. Tex Sample, has written:

"I remember Harrell Beck as an extraordinary teacher, a lecturer of compelling power, a sensitive spirit, and a deeply formed Christian who cared personally for his students. As a speaker and preacher, he was simply electric."
