= Harrell (name) =

Harrell is a given name and a surname. Notable people with the name include:

== Given name ==
- Harrell F. Beck (1922–1987), American preacher
- Harrell Fletcher (born 1967), American artist

== Surname ==
- Andre Harrell (1960–2020), American entrepreneur
- Barbara Harrell-Bond (1932–2018), British American social scientist
- Ben Harrell (1911–1981), United States Army general
- Bev Harrell (born 1946), Australian pop singer
- Blake Harrell (born 1979), American football coach
- Bob Harrell (1915–2002), American football coach
- Bobby Harrell (born 1956), American politician
- Brett Harrell (born 1961), American politician
- Bruce Harrell (born 1958), Washington state politician
- Calvin Harrell (1949–1994), American and Canadian football player
- Chris Harrell (born 1983), American football player
- Conner Harrell (born 2004), American football player
- Costen Jordan Harrell (1885–1970), American bishop
- Dale Harrell (1974–2009), American matricide victim
- Damian Harrell (born 1975), American football player
- David Edwin Harrell (1930–2021), American historian
- Donwan Harrell, American fashion designer
- Dorothy Harrell (1924–2011), American baseball player
- Gary Harrell (born 1972), American football coach
- Gary L. Harrell (1951-2023), United States Army general
- Glenn T. Harrell, Jr. (born 1945), American judge
- Graham Harrell (born 1985), American football player
- Greg Harrell (born 1961), bobsledder
- Hanna Harrell (born 2003), American figure skater
- James Harrell (American football) (born 1957), American football player
- James A. Harrell, III (born 1974), American politician
- James N. Harrell (1918–2000), American actor
- Jaylen Harrell (born 2002), American football player
- Jim Harrell, Jr., American politician
- Joey Harrell (born 1985), American basketball player
- John Harrell (born 1947), American baseball player
- John M. Harrell (1828–1907), American lawyer, editor, and writer
- Jules P. Harrell (born 1949), American psychologist
- Justin Harrell (born 1984), American football player
- Kelly Harrell (1889–1942), American musician
- Kuk Harrell, American songwriter
- Lucas Harrell (born 1985), American baseball player
- Lynn Harrell (1944–2020), American cellist
- Mack Harrell (1909–1960), American baritone vocalist
- Maestro Harrell (born 1991), American musician and actor
- Montrezl Harrell (born 1994), American basketball player
- Rebecca Harrell Tickell (born 1980), American producer and director
- Reggie Harrell (born 1981), American football player
- Ronnie Harrell (born 1996), American basketball player
- Sally Harrell (born 1966), American politician
- Sarah Carmichael Harrell (1844–1929), American educator, temperance reformer, writer
- Todd Harrell, American musician
- Tom Harrell (born 1946), American jazz trumpeter
- Trajal Harrell (born 1973), American dancer
- Ty Harrell (born 1970), American politician
- Tyler Harrell (born 2000), American football player
- Willard Harrell (born 1952), American football player
- William G. Harrell (1922–1964), American recipient of the Medal of Honor

== See also ==
- Harrel, surname
