= Harro Ran =

Dutch water polo player (1937–1990)

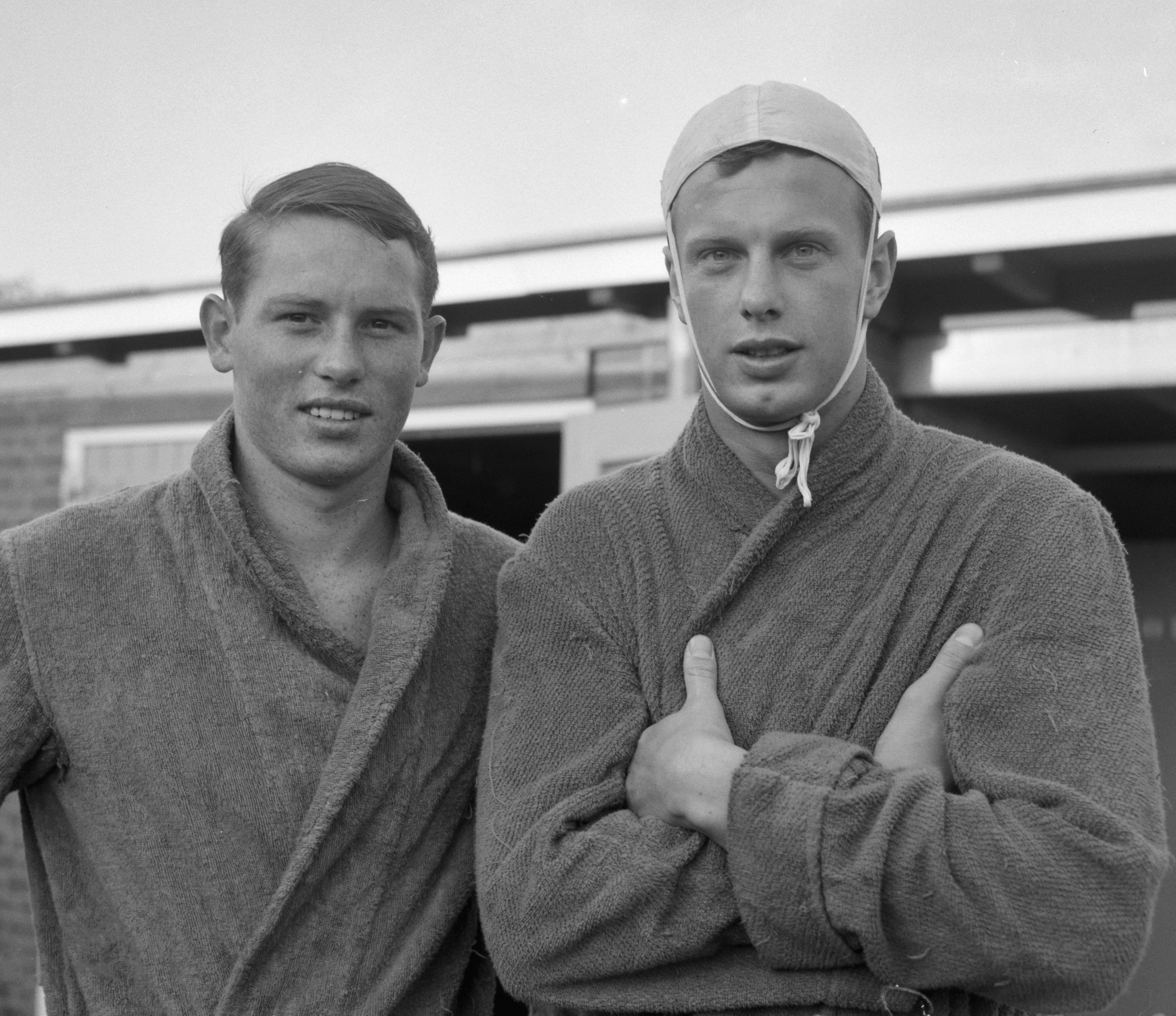
- Ran (right) with teammate Bram Leenards in 1961

Personal information
- Born: 18 April 1937 The Hague, the Netherlands
- Died: 10 March 1990 (aged 52) The Hague, the Netherlands
- Height: 193 cm (6 ft 4 in)
- Weight: 90 kg (198 lb)

Sport
- Sport: Water polo
- Club: HZ ZIAN, The Hague

Harro Ran (18 April 1937 – 10 March 1990) was a Dutch water polo player. He was part of the Dutch team that placed eighth at the 1960 Summer Olympics.
