= Rie de Balbian Verster-Bolderheij =

Dutch painter (1890–1990)

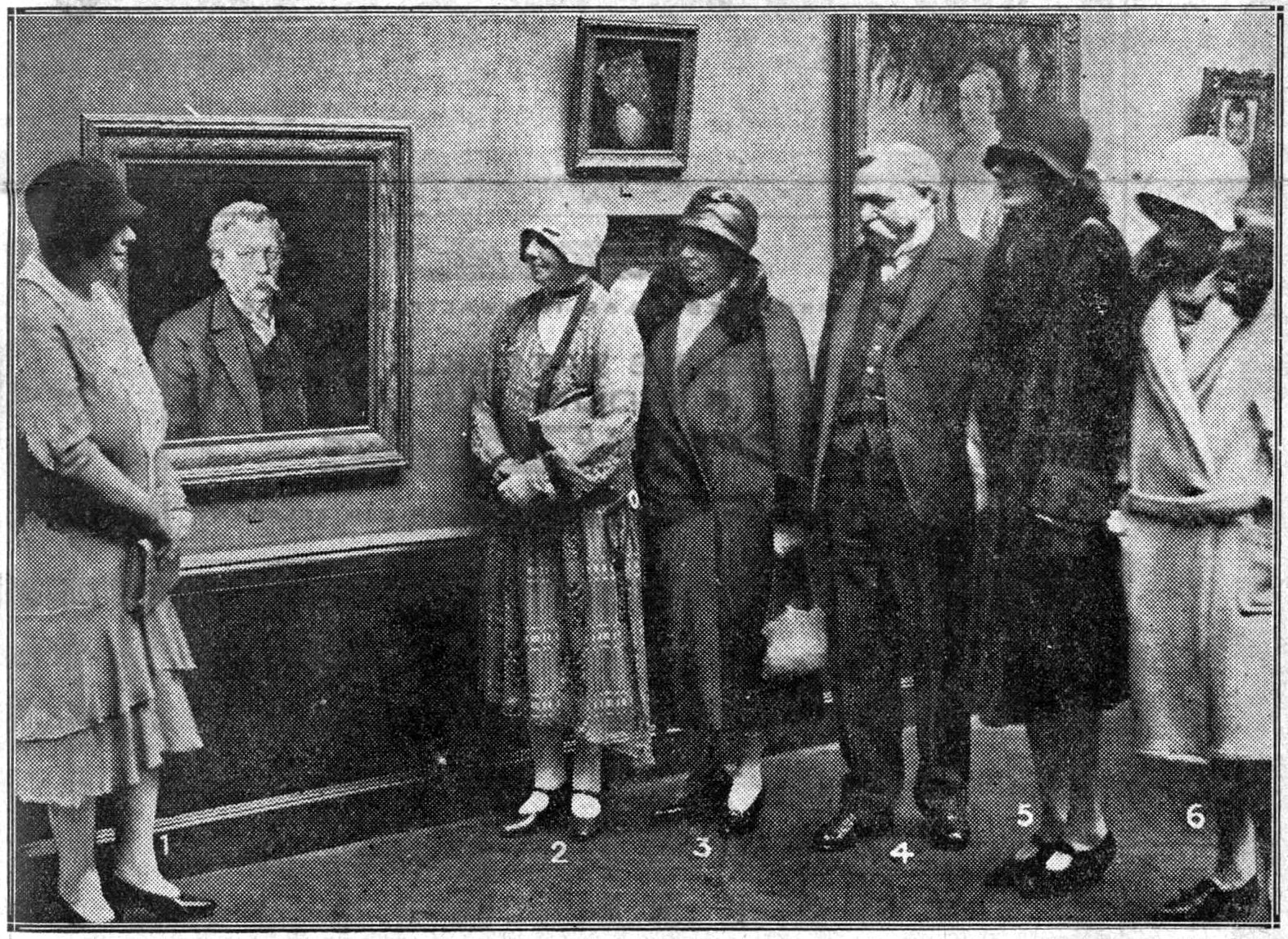
- 1929 Exhibition of works by Rie de Balbian Verster—Bolderheij in the Stedelijk Museum Amsterdam with the painter on the left and Theodore Ketelaar on the middle right
- Born: Hendrika Cornelia Bolderheij; 25 February 1890; Amsterdam, The Netherlands
- Died: 12 March 1990 (aged 100); Weesp, The Netherlands
- Known for: Painting
- Spouse: Jan François Leopold de Balbian Verster (m. 1910)

Hendrika Cornelia "Rie" de Balbian Verster-Bolderheij (born Hendrika Cornelia Bolderheij; 25 February 1890 – 12 March 1990) was a Dutch painter. She attended the Dagtekenschool voor meisjes (English:Day drawing school for girls) in Amsterdam. She submitted some of her work into the "Paintings" event of the "Mixed Painting" category of the art competitions at the 1928 Summer Olympics, but did not win a medal.

== Background ==
Born in Amsterdam in 1890, she married publicist Jan François Leopold de Balbian Verster in 1910. She was a member of Amsterdam's Arti et Amicitiae society and the Vereeniging Sint Lucas (Amsterdam). Balbian Verster-Bolderheij's work was included in the 1939 exhibition and sale Onze Kunst van Heden (Our Art of Today) at the Rijksmuseum in Amsterdam.

She was also a member of the Amsterdam artists' associations Arti et Amicitiae and the Guild of Saint Luke. She focused on painting portraits and still lifes, including the actress Sara Heyblom. The trips that de Balbian-Verster-Bolderheij made later in her career to Japan, Hong Kong, Morocco, Russia and Jordan were an important source of inspiration.

Between 1910 and 1917, she had three daughters. Through the daughters' encouragement, she became a board member around 1921 and, in 1923, chairman of the Amsterdam branch of Het Nederlandse Meisjesgilde (English: Dutch Girl Scouts' Guild). In 1933, she became a member of the main board of the national organisation. All three daughters were in Japanese-run civilian internment camps in the Dutch East Indies (Indonesia) during World War II. She died in Weesp on 12 March 1990 at the age of 100.

== See also ==
- Dutch painting
