= Massachusetts Bible Society =

Ecumenical organization

- Formation: July 6, 1809; 217 years ago
- Region served: Massachusetts
- Executive Director: Reverend Anne Robertson
- Main organ: Board of Trustees
- Affiliations: National Association of State and Regional Bible Societies
- Website: www.massbible.org/

The Massachusetts Bible Society is a Christian, ecumenical organization founded on July 6, 1809 at a ceremony in the Representatives Chamber of the Massachusetts State House. It was formally incorporated on February 10, 1810 and is the third oldest Bible Society in the United States, following the Philadelphia society, founded December 12, 1808 (now known as the Pennsylvania Bible Society), and the Connecticut society, founded in the Spring of 1809. The offices of the society are located in Newton Centre, Massachusetts on the campus of Andover Newton Theological School.

While affiliated with the National Association of State and Regional Bible Societies and often working with the American Bible Society and the International Bible Society, the Massachusetts Bible Society is an independent organization governed by its own board of trustees.

== History ==
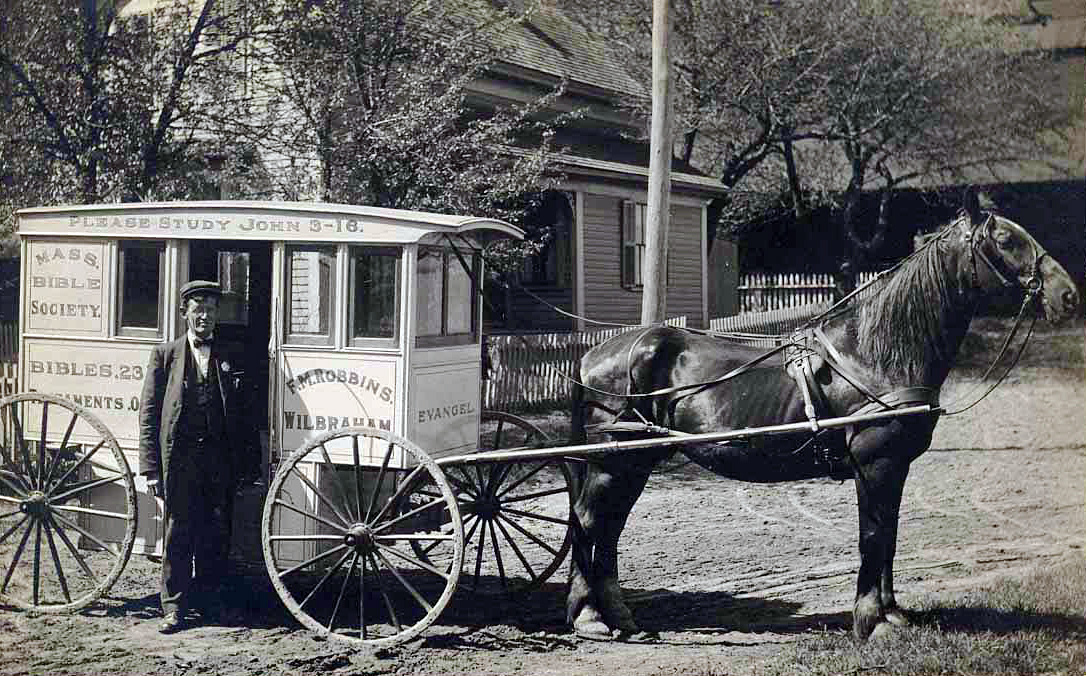
A photograph of a Massachusetts Bible Society colporteur from the MBS archives.

The initial mission of the Massachusetts Bible Society was the distribution of Bibles, achieved through colporteurs who traveled the state in horse-drawn wagons and visited the immigrant population at the Boston docks. The first mission statement read: The Bible Society is instituted for the purpose of raising funds by voluntary contribution, to be appropriated in procuring Bibles and Testaments to be distributed among all persons inhabiting within the State or elsewhere, who are destitute of the sacred Scriptures, and who cannot be conveniently supplied without the aid of others.

The 107 men listed as being present at the July 6, 1809 founding ceremony are: John Quincy Adams, Timothy Alden Jr., Thomas Allen, William Andrews, Samuel T. Armstrong, John Bartlett, Samuel Bartlett, Joshua Bates, Elam Bliss, Alden Bradford, William Brown Jr., Joseph Buckminster, Josiah Bumstead, Thomas Bumstead, George Cabot, Andrew Calhoun, Joseph Callender, Samuel Cary, Francis D. Channing, Henry Chapman, Joseph Chickering, John Codman, Samuel Dana, John Davis (Massachusetts Governor), William Davis, Thomas Dawes, Edward Dorr, Asa Eaton, Joseph Eckley, John Eliot, William Emerson (minister), John Farrar, John Foster, Abel Fox, James Freeman (clergyman), Thomas Furber, Caleb Gannett, Samuel Gile, Moses Grant, Moses Grant Jr., Thomas Gray, John Grew, Edward Dorr Griffin, Samuel Haven, Lemuel (or perhaps Levi) Hedge, William Hilliard, Oliver Holden, Horace Holley (minister), Abiel Holmes, Henry Homes, Joshua Huntington, Francis Hyde, David Hyslop, Henderson Inches, Joseph W. Jenkins, Samuel Kendal, John Thornton Kirkland, Ebenezer Larkin, John Lathrop, Ensign Lincoln, Charles Russell Lowell Sr., Daniel Mallory, Joseph McKean, John Mellen, Josiah Moore, Jedidiah Morse, Jacob Norton, Daniel P. Parker, Isaac Parker, Nathan Parker, Francis Parkman, Eliphalet Pearson, William Perkins, Edward Phillips, John Phillips (mayor), Jonathan Phillips, William Phillips Jr., John Pierce, Eliphalet Porter, Isaac Rand, Edward H. Robins, Ebenezer Rockwood, Daniel D. Rogers, Timothy Rogers, Josiah Salisbury, Samuel Salisbury, John Simpkins, Chester Stebbins, John L. Sullivan, John Tappan, Peter Oxenbridge Thacher, William Thurston, Edward Tuckerman Jr., Gustavus Tuckerman, Joseph Tuckerman, Dudley A. Tyng, Samuel H. Walley, John Walton, Henry Ware (Unitarian), Isaac Warren, Isaac Warren Jr., Samuel Webber, Sidney Willard, Ebenezer Withington, Francis Wright, Luther Wright.

Although the granting of Bibles has continued from that time to the present, from 1895–2007 the Massachusetts Bible Society was known primarily for its bookstores, selling both Bibles and other religious books in stores located at New England seminaries and on Bromfield Street in downtown Boston.

The first female Board member was elected in 1980, and in April, 2007 MBS hired the organization's first female Executive Director, the Reverend Anne Robertson.

In response to a planned but never executed Quran-burning event in 2010, the Massachusetts Bible Society announced they would distribute two copies of the Quran for every one that was burned. They issued a statement saying that "as people of the Book, we are joined to Islam and Judaism in a special way and as an organization that has sought to put that Book into people's hands for 201 years, we cannot stand idly by while the sacred text of a sister religion is burned as our beloved Bibles once were."

== Today ==
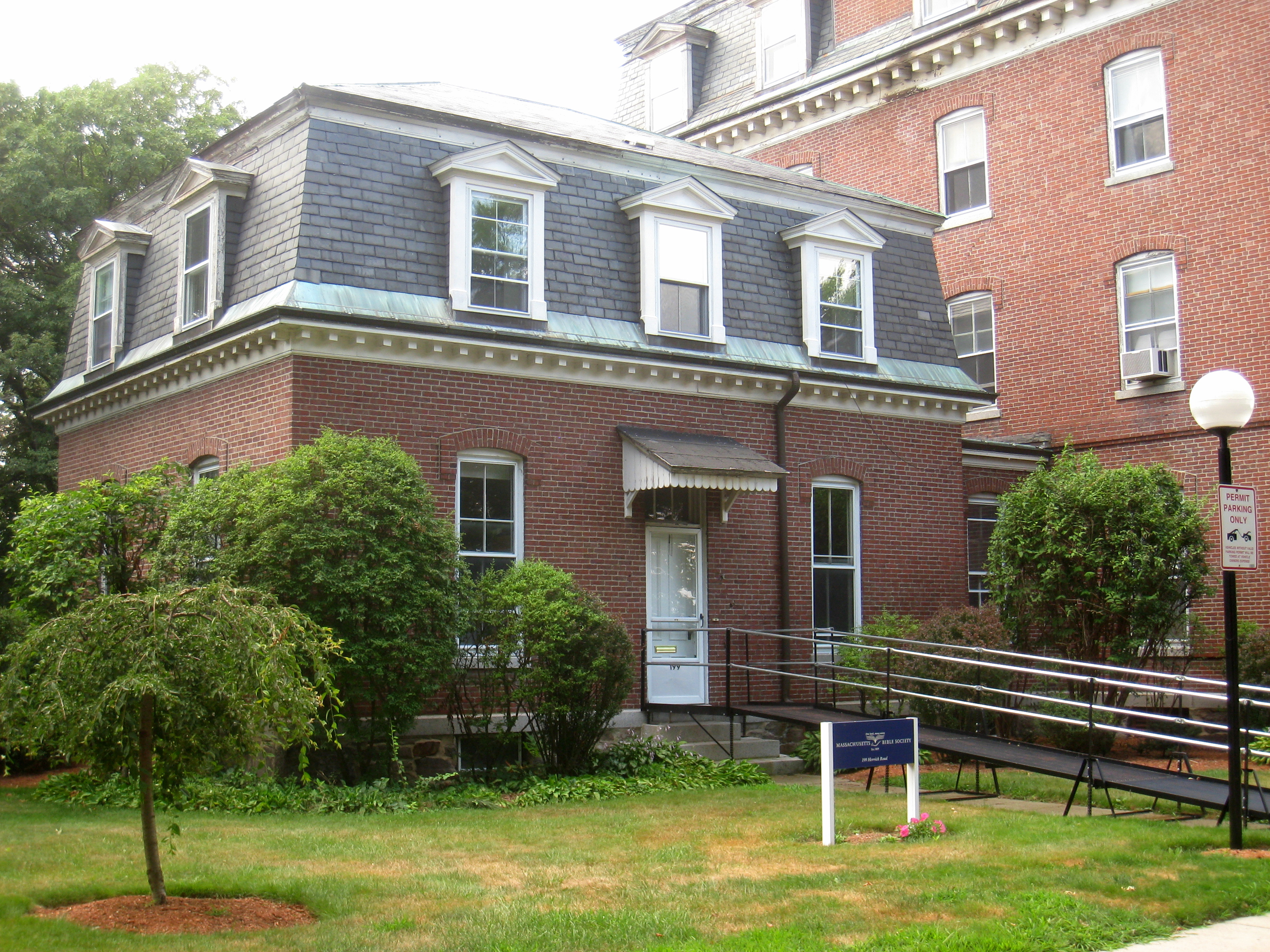
Bible Society headquarters at Andover Newton

With society moving from print to digital media, the Society divested itself of the last of its bookstores in July 2007 and in February 2008 agreed to give a grant to Andover Newton Theological School to establish a Media Center in Wilson Chapel.

The current mission statement of the Massachusetts Bible Society reads: The Massachusetts Bible Society is a Christian organization that exists to promote biblical literacy, understanding and dialogue that is grounded in scholarship, socially relevant, and respectful of the many voices within the Bible and all those who turn to the Bible in faith.

Today's Society awards Bible grants, produces print and multi-media resources, and supplies small groups and local churches with resource recommendations to promote biblical literacy and scholarship.

== See also ==
- Bible Society
