= James Arrell =

US international rugby union player (b. 1888)

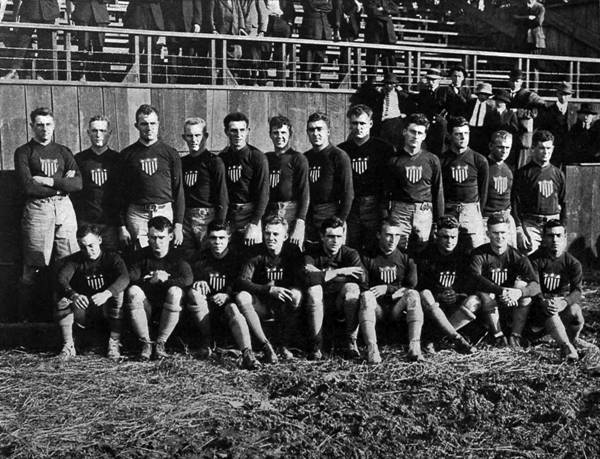
- Arrell with the US team in 1912 (pictured back row, seventh from left)
- Full name: James Lee Arrell
- Born: November 7, 1888 Wyandotte, Kansas, US
- Died: March 26, 1955 (aged 66) Abilene, Texas, US
- University: Stanford University

Rugby union career
- Position: Prop
Amateur team(s)
Years	Team	Apps	(Points)
1910–1914(?)	Stanford University		
1913	Olympic Club		
- Correct as of June 25, 2018
International career
Years	Team	Apps	(Points)
1912	United States	1	(0)
- Correct as of June 26, 2018

James Lee Arrell (November 7, 1888 – March 26, 1955) was an American rugby union player who played prop for the United States men's national team in its first capped match in 1912.

== Biography ==
Arrell was born on November 7, 1888, in Wyandotte, Kansas, the son of Happer Samuel Arrell and Mary Eva Arrell (born Ege). Arrell attended Stanford University beginning in 1910, where he played in the front row for the school's rugby team, ending the 1910 season with a record of seven wins and one loss. While at Stanford, Arrell became a member of the Lambda Sigma chapter of the Beta Theta Pi fraternity.

On November 16, 1912, Arrell played for the United States national rugby union team at prop in its first capped match against Australia, a 12–8 loss. This would be his only appearance for the United States in a test match. In 1913, Arrell would also play rugby for Olympic Club in San Francisco, California. Arrell married Annie M. Holderman, and was the father of seven children. He moved to Abilene, Texas, in 1930 and lived there until his death on March 26, 1955, at the age of 66.
