= Frédérique Harrel =

Frédérique (Freddie) Harrel is a London-based fashion blogger and host of the confidence workshops SHE Unleashed. She worked for ASOS as a personal stylist until 2015. In 2017, she launched her own brand of ethical afro hair extensions called Big Hair No Care. Based in the UK, the brand includes a 30% sale base in the US.

== Recognition ==
She was on the Popsugar 2018 list of 24 of the World's Most Popular Style Bloggers. She is one of the models for the Boots No7 Lift and Luminate range of products. In 2018, she won the Gold Standard Award for Influencer of the Year at Cosmopolitan. She was on the Huffington Post list of 15 fashion Instagram accounts you need to be following in 2019.

== Background ==
Harrel was born in Paris and resides in London. She has a master's degree in finance and an MBA.
