= Lockie Wood =

Australian rules footballer, born 1904

Personal information
- Full name: John Locksley Wood
- Born: 4 November 1904; Fitzroy North, Victoria
- Died: 3 March 1990 (aged 85); Sale, Victoria
- Original team: Edithvale
- Height: 170 cm (5 ft 7 in)
- Weight: 70 kg (154 lb)

Playing career^{1}
Years	Club	Games (Goals)
1926–28	Fitzroy	22 (5)
- ^{1} Playing statistics correct to the end of 1928.

Jack Locksley Wood (4 November 1904 – 3 March 1990) was an Australian rules footballer who played with Fitzroy in the Victorian Football League (VFL).

In 1941 Wood enlisted in the Royal Australian Air Force.
