= Wilhelm Höttl =

Austrian SS officer (1915–1999)

Wilhelm Höttl or Hoettl (19 March 1915 – 27 June 1999) was an Austrian Nazi Party member, and SS member who rose to the rank of SS-Sturmbannführer. He served in the Sicherheitsdienst (Security Service; SD), and by 1944 was acting head of Intelligence and Counter Espionage in Central and South East Europe. After the war ended, he was recruited by the United States Army Counter Intelligence Corps (CIC). Later, Höttl opened a school in Bad Aussee and authored three books. He died in 1999.

== Biography ==
Höttl was born in Vienna, Austria-Hungary, 19 March 1915. In 1938, at the age of 23, he received a doctorate in history from the University of Vienna.

While still a student, he joined the Nazi Party (member no. 6309616) and the SS (member no. 309510). From late 1939 until the end of World War II in Europe, Höttl was employed almost without interruption by Germany's central intelligence and security agency, the Reichssicherheitshauptamt (RSHA; Reich Security Main Office). The RSHA was made up of seven main departments, including: the Sicherheitsdienst (SD; Security Service); the Sicherheitspolizei (SiPo; Security Police), composed of the Gestapo (Secret State Police) and the Kriminalpolizei (Kripo; Criminal Police).

Höttl was first stationed in Vienna with the SD foreign bureau and then moved to Berlin where he was promoted to the rank of SS-Sturmbannführer (major). In October 1941, disciplinary proceedings were initiated against Höttl for alleged official misconduct. The head of the RSHA, Reinhard Heydrich, ordered his transfer to the Waffen-SS, first to the 1st SS Panzer Division, and then to the 7th SS Volunteer Mountain Division.

In 1944 Höttl became the Ausland-SD's acting head of Intelligence and Counter Espionage in Central and South East Europe. In March he was assigned to Budapest, where he served as second in command to Reichsführer-SS Heinrich Himmler's SS representative in Hungary. In addition, Höttl served as political advisor to Hitler's ambassador there, Edmund Veesenmayer, who reported to Berlin, for example, on the large-scale deportations in 1944 of Jews from Hungary. During his stay in Budapest he was in contact with the Americans in Bern, Switzerland.

As the residual Nazi German empire collapsed in 1945, with Höttl's position allowing him official access to German passports and official entry visas to Switzerland, he leveraged the position for his own gain. Those who paid Höttl were Hungarian SS officer Árpád Toldi, who was in charge of the Hungarian Gold Train. Toldi and his family left the train with a large amount of gold on 30 March 1945, as the train crossed into Austria - the Soviet Red Army was only 10 miles behind. Toldi's convoy tried to enter neutral Switzerland 10 days later, but was refused entry. Toldi then paid Höttl 10% of his convoy's goods (4 cases of gold) in return for German passports and Swiss visas for all of his family. Toldi and his family then successfully entered Switzerland, but he was later detained in Austria that year, interrogated by Allied authorities, but released and has never been traced again.

== Prosecution witness at the Nuremberg trials ==
In March 1945, Höttl contacted OSS authorities in Switzerland and in May 1945 surrendered himself to American authorities in Bad Aussee. He was then taken to Germany, where he was confined until October 1947 when he was transferred to Austria and confined in Lager Klessheim, Salzburg. During this time Höttl figured prominently as a prosecution witness at the Nuremberg trials. In an affidavit dated 25 November 1945, the 30-year-old Höttl described a conversation he held with Adolf Eichmann in August 1944 during the closing months of the war. The meeting of the two men took place at Höttl's office in Budapest:

Approximately 4,000,000 Jews had been killed in the various concentration camps, while an additional 2,000,000 met death in other ways, the major part of whom were shot by operational squads of the Security Police during the campaign against Russia.

== Work for US Army intelligence ==
Höttl was released from confinement in December 1947. In March 1948 he got in contact with the CIC and became subsequently control chief of two espionage operations, namely "MOUNT VERNON" and "MONTGOMERY". His task was to conduct espionage against the Communist Party of Austria and Soviet activities in the Soviet-occupied part of Austria. Höttl was described by the CIC as "an excellent source for ideas, both concrete and theoretical, on the expansion of American Intelligence in Austria."

== Later life ==
In 1952 Höttl opened a school in Bad Aussee and served as its director until 1980. Under the name Walter Hagen he wrote the books The Secret Front (Enigma Books, 1954) and Unternehmen Bernhard. Ein historischer Tatsachenbericht über die größte Geldfälscheraktion aller Zeiten (Welsermühl Verlag, Wels 1955), a historical report on the biggest currency counterfeit operation in history (the Germans had printed millions of British pounds). Under his own name he later published Einsatz für das Reich. Im Auslandsgeheimdienst des Dritten Reiches, (Siegfried Bublies, Koblenz 1997, ISBN 3-926584-41-6).

Höttl received a cross of merit for his work as a historian and as a school director, despite the protest of surviving Nazi victims. Höttl died 27 June 1999 in Altaussee, Austria, aged 84.
