= Mario Aguilar (sailor) =

Salvadoran sailor (1925–1990)

Mario David Aguilar
Personal information
- Nationality: El Salvador
- Born: 23 May 1925; San Salvador, El Salvador
- Died: 6 March 1990 (aged 64); San Salvador, El Salvador
- Height: 1.77 m (5 ft 10 in)
- Weight: 78 kg (172 lb)

Sport
- Sport: Sailing

Mario David Aguilar (23 May 1925 – 6 March 1990) was a Salvadoran sailor. He competed in the 1968 Summer Olympics.
