= Samuel Bartlett (silversmith) =

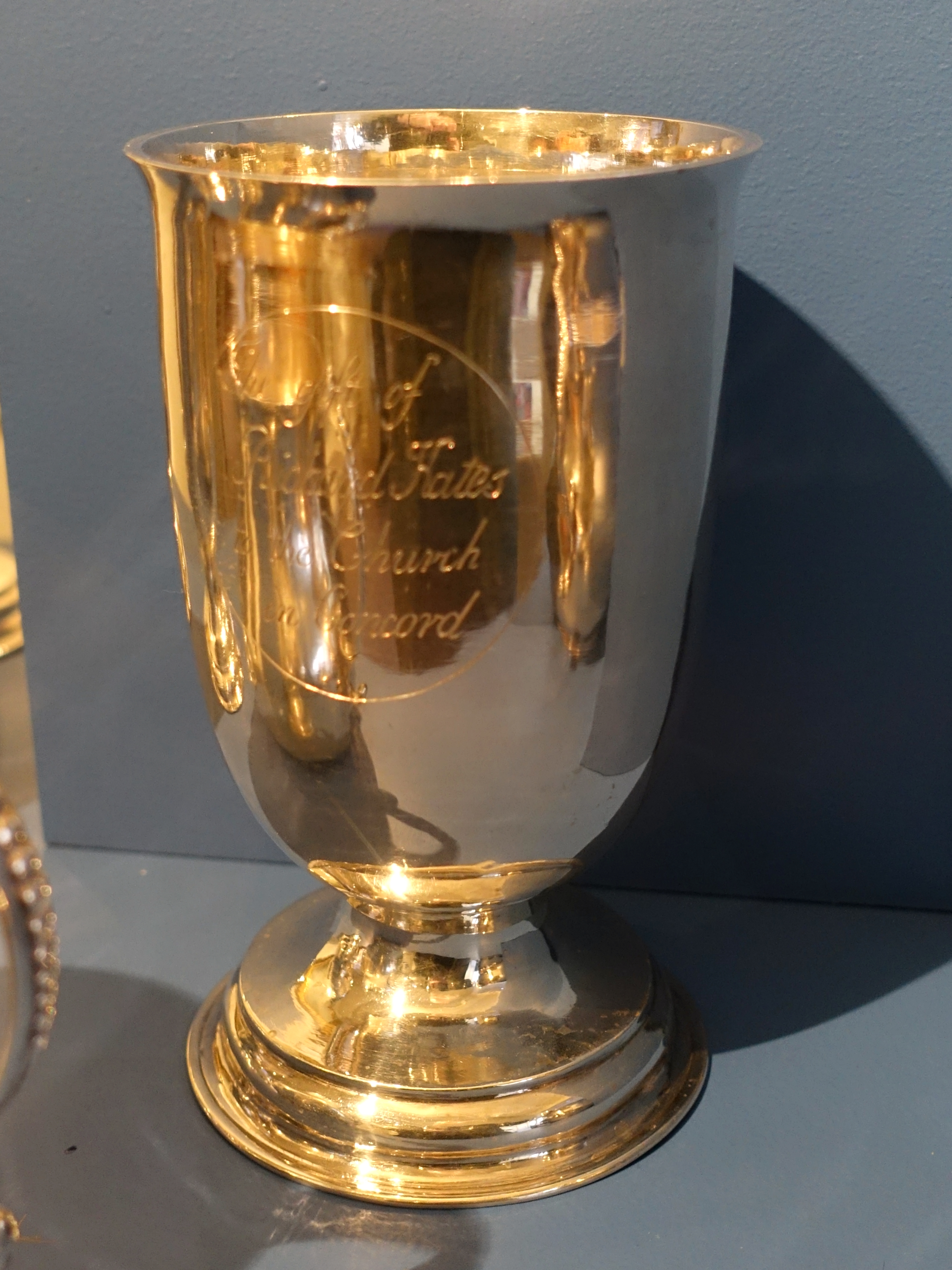
Footed cup, marked by Samuel Bartlett

Samuel Bartlett (November 17, 1752 – September 29, 1821) was an American silversmith in Concord, Massachusetts, the founder of the Massachusetts Bible Society, a member of the Cambridge Humane Society, and also from 1795-1820 the elected Register of Deeds for Middlesex County, Massachusetts. He apprenticed with Samuel Minott in Boston.
