= Dave Arrell =

Australian rules footballer

Personal information
- Full name: David Henry Arrell
- Born: 5 April 1913; Carlton, Victoria
- Died: 22 March 1990 (aged 76)
- Original team: Brunswick

Playing career^{1}
Years	Club	Games (Goals)
1934	Carlton	4 (1)
- ^{1} Playing statistics correct to the end of 1934.

David Henry Arrell (5 April 1913 – 22 March 1990) was an Australian rules footballer who played with Carlton in the Victorian Football League (VFL).
