= Henry Hecksher =

Henry D. Hecksher (September 21, 1910 – March 28, 1990) was a career United States intelligence officer who served in both the OSS and CIA.

Hecksher was born in Hamburg, Germany and immigrated to the United States in 1934 or 1938. He joined the United States Army, achieving the rank of captain. Hecksher took part in the Normandy invasion, and was wounded in Antwerp.

He later became an intelligence officer with the Army and interrogated some of the top Nazi leaders, including Julius Streicher. He joined the OSS and in 1946 became head of its counterintelligence section in Berlin. Later, this section would become the CIA's Berlin Operating Base, also known as BOB. Hecksher would eventually work under CIA station chief William Harvey at BOB.

Hecksher became heavily involved in CIA covert operations, including the Berlin Tunnel project. He was CIA Station Chief in Santiago, and was involved in covert actions in the period before the coup d'etat which overthrew Chilean president Salvador Allende Gossens in 1973. Accusations persist that Hecksher, the CIA and the US Government were instrumental in the coup.

In 1990, Hecksher died from complications of Parkinson's disease in Princeton, New Jersey.
