= Jean Hauet =

French field hockey player (1925–1990)

Jean Paul Marie Hauet (25 March 1925 – 25 March 1990) was a French field hockey player who competed in the 1948 Summer Olympics and in the 1952 Summer Olympics.
