= Charles Krüger =

Luxembourgish footballer

Personal information
- Date of birth: 9 March 1896
- Place of birth: Luxembourg, Luxembourg
- Date of death: 8 March 1990 (aged 93)
- Place of death: Luxembourg, Luxembourg
- Position: Goalkeeper

International career
| Years | Team | Apps | (Gls) |
- Luxembourg

Charles Krüger (9 March 1896 – 8 March 1990) was a Luxembourgish footballer. He competed in the men's tournament at the 1920 Summer Olympics.
