= ActionKid =

American livestreamer (born 1988)

Kenneth Chin
- Born: October 9, 1987 (age 39); New York City, New York, U.S.
- Years active: 2016–present

YouTube information
- Channel: ActionKid
- Years active: 2016–present
- Genres: IRL; travel documentary
- Subscribers: 449 thousand
- Views: 198 million
- Last updated: 29 August 2025
- Website: actionkidtv.com

Kenneth Chin, known online as ActionKid, is a Chinese American YouTuber and IRL livestreamer.

== YouTube ==
Chin has had a YouTube account since September 2010, and the channel was launched on January 10, 2016.

== Personal life ==
Chin enjoys walking and has always been "obsessed with subways" since he was younger. Chin, in his "ActionKid" persona, shoots videos frequently, and his routes are influenced by "[c]urrent events, reopenings, time of day, requests from viewers, and [Chin's] availability." Chin also holds a NYC tour guide license as of 2019.

As of 2026, he currently lives in Ho Chi Minh City, Vietnam.
